= Carpe =

South Korean esport player

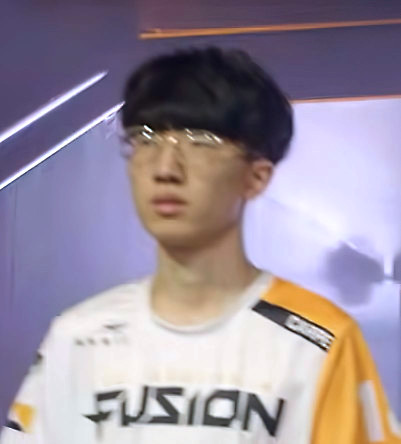
- Carpe in 2019

Personal information
- Name: Lee Jae-hyeok
- Born: 1997 or 1998 (age 28–29)
- Nationality: South Korean

Current team
- Team: T1
- Game: Valorant
- League: Valorant Champions Tour

Career information
- Games: Overwatch (2016–2022); Valorant (2022–present)
- Playing career: 2016–present

Team history
- Overwatch
- 2016–2017: BK Stars
- 2017: Selfless Gaming
- 2017: FaZe Clan
- 2018–2022: Philadelphia Fusion
- Valorant
- 2022–present: T1

Career highlights and awards
- OWL Role Star (2020); 3× OWL All-Star (2018, 2019, 2020); OWWC champion (2018); No. 18 retired by Philadelphia Fusion

Lee Jae-hyeok (Korean: 이재혁), better known as Carpe, is a South Korean professional Valorant player for T1. He was a professional Overwatch player formerly.

He began his esports career playing Overwatch for teams such as BK Stars, Selfless Gaming, and FaZe Clan. Carpe then signed with the Philadelphia Fusion of the Overwatch League in the league's inaugural season, where he played for five years. Following the OWL's 2022 season, Carpe left competitive Overwatch and began his Valorant career.

As an Overwatch competitor, Carpe is best known for his ability to play mechanically demanding damage heroes, such as the sniper Widowmaker. Since the inception of the OWL, Carpe has been selected to play in every All-Star Game, was awarded with a Role Star commendation in 2019, and has twice been an Overwatch League Most Valuable Player finalist. In 2018, Carpe and the Fusion reached the 2018 Grand Finals, where they were defeated by the London Spitfire. Outside of the OWL, Carpe has taken home a gold and bronze medal at the Overwatch World Cup as a member of Team South Korea in 2018 and 2019, respectively.

== Early life ==
Carpe grew up in Daejeon, South Korea. His mother, a kindergarten teacher, and father, a follower of Won Buddhism, were out of the home often, and Carpe would often go to the school his mother taught at after he was done with class. In first grade, he played StarCraft after seeing the teaching assistants at his mother's school playing it. He became very competitive with every video game he played from thereafter, causing concern from his mother and father. His mother and father placed Carpe into speedskating in elementary school, in an effort to give him physical activity away from a computer screen.

Carpe began playing Overwatch when the game was released in 2016. Getting ready to graduate from high school, he convinced his parents to support his gaming career after showing his mother that he was ranked number one in the Korean competitive leaderboards.

== Professional career ==
=== Overwatch ===
==== Early career ====
Carpe began his competitive Overwatch career in 2017 with team BK Stars in the second and third seasons of the OGN APEX Series, a premier Overwatch tournament series in South Korea. After failing to make it past the group stages in either season, BK Stars disbanded. He then moved to the United States to join Selfless Gaming on a trial basis, although Selfless Gaming later also disbanded shortly after. In July 2017, Carpe joined FaZe Clan to compete in the first season of Overwatch Contenders North America. FaZe finished second place after losing the Grand Finals match to Team Envy.

==== Philadelphia Fusion ====
Carpe signed with the Philadelphia Fusion ahead of the Overwatch League's inaugural season. In the 2018 season, teams mainly ran a team composition of heroes with high mobility that required a high mechanical skill, a playstyle that suited Carpe, as he generally played as Tracer, a high-mobility damage hero, or Widowmaker, a sniper. In the Stage 2 playoff semifinals against the London Spitfire, Carpe had 24 eliminations, 14 final blows, and one death in the 3–2 victory. In the Stage 2 Finals against the New York Excelsior, he outperformed his counterpart, New York damage player Park "Saebyeolbe" Jong-ryeol, in the first two maps as the Fusion took an early 2–0 lead; however, Carpe struggled in the second half, losing nearly every engagement he had against Saebyeolbe, and the Fusion lost 2–3. For his performance on in the regular season, Carpe was named as a starter in the 2018 All-Star Game Additionally, he finished in third place for the Overwatch League regular season MVP award, behind MVP winner Bang "Jjonak" Seong-hyun and runner-up Baek "Fissure" Chan-hyung.

The Fusion finished the regular season with a 24–16 record and claimed the sixth seed in the 2018 Overwatch League playoffs. After wins over the Boston Uprising and New York Excelsior, the Fusion advanced to the 2018 Grand Finals, where they faced the London Spitfire. Prior to the Grand Finals, Carpe had the highest player rating among all damage players, was the second-best Widowmaker among all players with at least two hours of play, and had the second-highest elimination participation percentage at 28% throughout the entire season. Throughout the playoffs, he had the 13th-highest average damage per 10 minutes at 6,706 and his participation in 28% of his team's eliminations was the highest among all playoff players. In the best-of-three-match series, Carpe was held down a majority of the time, as the Fusion lost both matches, 1–3 and 0–3.

Through the first three stages of the 2019 season, the most prominent team composition, known as the meta, in the OWL consisted of running three tank heroes and three support heroes in which keeping tanks alive and sustaining over long periods of time were the highest priority. As a damage player, Carpe made the transition to primarily playing the tank hero Zarya, a change that he would have rather not have had to make. "If I could play [damage], it would be very happy for me," Carpe said in an interview with the Overwatch League, "but this is meta and we are pro players. We have to adapt to the meta." Throughout the season, Carpe struggled with the new playstyle and hero. In the final quarter of the season, the league implemented an enforced 2-2-2 role lock, where teams must use a team composition of two damage, two tank, and two support heroes, allowing Carpe to consistently play as a damage hero. He was selected as a starter for the 2019 All-Star Game, marking his second consecutive year receiving the honor.

After a 15–13 win–loss record in the regular season, the Fusion finished in 10th place and advanced to the play-in tournament for a chance to reach the 2019 playoffs. The Fusion's lost their first match, against the Shanghai Dragons, ending their 2019 season.

Prior to the 2020 season, the Fusion signed Carpe to a three-year contract extension through the 2022 season. In Week 10 of the regular season, Carpe reached two career milestones: he became the first player in Overwatch League history to reach 600 career solo kills in a 3–2 victory over the Paris Eternal, and the following day, he became the first player in Overwatch League history to reach 4,000 final blows in a 3–2 win over the Atlanta Reign. At the end of the 2020 regular season, Carpe led the league in final blows to death ratio at 2.3, was third in final blows at 1,059, and sixth in damage dealt at 942,383. He received several accolades in the 2020 season: he was named a 2020 All-Star, was awarded a Damage Role Star commendation, and was a 2020 regular season MVP finalist.

Carpe and the Fusion finished the 2020 regular season with the top seed in the North America playoffs. The Fusion advanced to the Grand Finals bracket of the playoffs before being swept by both the Shanghai Dragons and Seoul Dynasty.

In the second week of the 2021 season, Carpe reached a career milestone, claiming the 10,000th kill of his OWL career in a win over the Hangzhou Spark.

Carpe's number 18 jersey was retired by the Fusion on February 27, 2023.

=== Valorant ===
On November 11, 2022, the Fusion announced that Carpe had retired from professional Overwatch to join T1's Valorant team.

== National team career ==
Carpe was selected to play in the 2018 Overwatch World Cup (OWWC) as a member of Team South Korea. After going 5–0 in the group stage in Incheon, South Korea, the team advanced to the knockout stage in Anaheim, California. Carpe primarily played as Widowmaker throughout the knockout stage, as Team South Korea swept Australia, United Kingdom, and China to win the World Cup title. The following year, Carpe was again selected to play for Team South Korea in the 2019 Overwatch World Cup as only one of two players to have played for the team before. The team lost the OWWC for the first time, after losing to Team USA 1–3 in the semifinals; they defeated Team France in the third place match to take home the bronze medal.
