= Leave (gamer) =

Chinese professional Overwatch player

Personal information
- Name: 黄馨 (Huang Xin)
- Born: 2001 or 2002 (age 24–25)
- Nationality: Chinese

Current team
- Team: Weibo Gaming
- Role: Damage
- Game: Overwatch
- League: Overwatch Champions Series

Career information
- Playing career: 2016–2017, 2020–present

Team history
- 2016–2017: Miraculous Youngster
- 2020–2022: Chengdu Hunters
- 2023: Hangzhou Spark
- 2024–2025: Once Again (Note: Played as LGD.OA for the 2024 Esports World Cup.)
- 2025–present: Weibo Gaming

Career highlights and awards
- OWL Most Valuable Player (2021); OWL Role Star (2021); OWPS Champion (2017); OWPS Most Valuable Player (2017)

Huang Xin (Chinese: 黄馨), better known by his online alias Leave, is a Chinese professional Overwatch player currently playing for Weibo Gaming in the Overwatch Champions Series (OWCS). He is best known for his ability to play a large variety of different damage heroes. Prior to the OWCS' inception, he played for Hangzhou Spark in the Overwatch League (OWL). Huang signed with the Chengdu Hunters organization in 2019 as contracted talent, and after turning 18 in 2020, he signed with the team as a player.

Huang was named the 2021 Overwatch League Most Valuable Player and received a Role Star commendation the same year. Outside of the OWL, Huang won Overwatch Premier Series with Miraculous Youngster and won the league's MVP award. Additionally, he played in two Overwatch World Cups as a member of Team China, with his best placement in Overwatch World Cup as runners-up.

== Professional career ==
=== Early career ===
Huang began his Overwatch career in 2016 playing with the team Miraculous Youngster. In 2017, he won the Overwatch Premier Series (OWPS), the premier Overwatch tournament series in China at the time, and was named the OWPS season MVP. Shortly after the 2017 Overwatch World Cup took place, Miraculous Youngster shut down operations, and Huang took a two-year hiatus from competitive Overwatch, aside from an appearance at the 2018 Overwatch World Cup. In his time away from Overwatch, Huang played PlayerUnknown's Battlegrounds competitively.

=== Chengdu Hunters ===
In July 2019, the Chengdu Hunters announced that they had signed Huang as "contracted talent." As he was only 17 years old at the time, Huang was not eligible to be officially signed as a player until he was 18.

Huang joined the Hunters as a player for the 2020 OWL season. Huang displayed his flexibility to play a variety of heroes throughout the regular season, playing seven different for at least 50 minutes, matching that of the 2020 season MVP Kim "Fleta" Byung-sun. The Hunters qualified for several midseason tournaments and finished with the second-best record in the league's Asia region.

Throughout the 2021 season, Huang again showcased his hero pool diversity, logging at least 50 minutes on seven different heroes. Additionally, he was the only player in the league to average 10 final blows, where a player delivers the final amount of damage needed to eliminate an enemy, per 10 minutes and set six Hunters' top eight franchise records for most final blows in a match. For his performance throughout the regular season, Huang was named the league's most valuable player, making him the first Chinese player to receive the award. Additionally, Huang was one of twelve players to receive a Role Star commendation, an award given to the top players across the league.

=== Hangzhou Spark ===
Huang signed with the Hangzhou Spark ahead of the 2023 season.

== National team career ==
Huang was selected as a member of Team China for the 2017 Overwatch World Cup (OWWC). The team ran through the qualifiers without losing a single map, advancing them to the main even. However, due to visa issues, only Huang and his teammate He "zhufanjun" Junjian were able to attend the event, forcing Team China to bring in substitutes to play. Team China fell in the quarterfinals to Team France.

The following year, Huang was again selected as a member of Team China for the 2018 Overwatch World Cup. In the qualifiers, Huang showcased his ability to play as a variety of different heroes, playing no less than seven — and as many as eleven — different heroes in a match. The team reached the OWWC finals, where they faced of against Team South Korea, but they lost the match, 0–4.

Huang was selected to play for Team China in the 2019 Overwatch World Cup, marking the third straight year he would compete with the team. However, he was forced to step down due to illness.

== Notes ==
Awards and achievements
Preceded by Kim "Fleta" Byung-sun	Overwatch League MVP; 2021	Succeeded by Kim "Proper" Dong-hyun
