= Space (gamer) =

American professional Overwatch player

SPACE
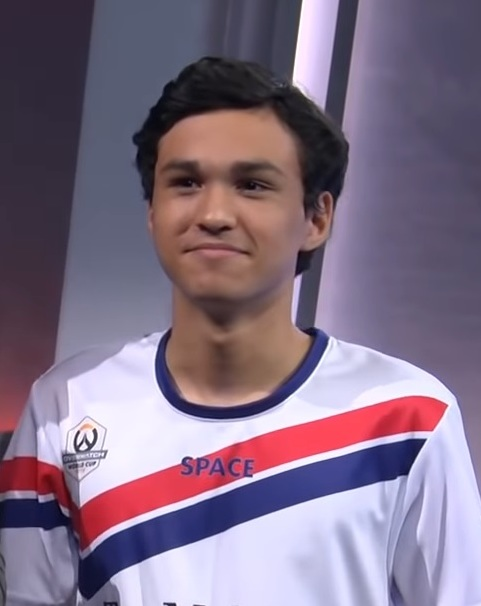
- Halpern in 2018

Personal information
- Name: Indy Halpern
- Born: March 28, 2000 (age 26)
- Nationality: American

No. 16 – Los Angeles Gladiators
- Role: Tank
- Game: Overwatch
- League: Overwatch League

Career information
- Playing career: 2017–present

Team history
- 2017: Arc 6
- 2017: Cloud9 (Note: Stand-in.)
- 2018–2019: Los Angeles Valiant
- 2020–present: Los Angeles Gladiators

Career highlights and awards
- OWWC champion (2019); OWL Role Star (2021); 3× OWL All-Star (2018, 2019, 2020)

Indy Halpern (born March 28, 2000), better known by his online alias SPACE, is an American professional Overwatch player in the Overwatch League (OWL). He began his career in 2017, playing with teams such as Arc 6 and Cloud9 in late 2017. Halpern signed with the Los Angeles Los Angeles Valiant of the OWL ahead of the league's inaugural season. After two seasons with the Valiant, he signed with the Los Angeles Gladiators.

Halpern has won two midseason playoff titles—one in 2018 and one in 2021. He is a three-time OWL All-Star and was awarded with a Role Star commendation in 2021. Outside of the OWL, Halpern played in the 2018 Overwatch World Cup (OWWC) and won the 2019 Overwatch World Cup as a member of Team USA.

== Early life ==
Halpern was born on March 28, 2000, to his mother Diane Mella and father Mike Halpern. From around age 7–8 until 14, he was a child model for companies such as Gap, Ralph Lauren, and Nike. Growing up, Halpern lived with his mother and grandmother on the Upper East Side of New York City, while attending Léman Manhattan Preparatory School in Lower Manhattan on a scholarship. However, being far away from where he grew up, as well as the commute to Lemen, was difficult for him, so his mother transferred him to Life Sciences, a public school on the Upper East Side. Halpern regularly skipped classes at Life Sciences to go home and play Overwatch, which led to him nearing academic probation at school. Performing well on the competitive mode in Overwatch, he dropped out of school to pursue a career as a professional Overwatch player, although he planned to take online classes to get his GED.

Halpern was featured in CBS News' 2018 documentary Esports: The Price of the Grind.

== Professional career ==
=== Early career ===
Halpern was a member of esports team Arc 6 in 2017. Later that year, esports organization Cloud9 picked up Halpern as a fill-in for Overwatch Contenders Europe Season One.

=== Los Angeles Valiant ===
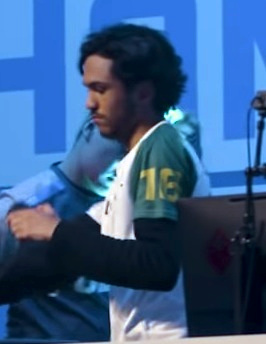
Halpern played for the Valiant from 2018 to 2019.

Ahead of the inaugural season of the Overwatch League, Halpern signed with the Los Angeles Valiant. At the time of signing, he was underage and was not eligible to play until March 2018. Halpern made his professional debut on April 4, 2018, right after the midpoint of the season, and immediately make an impact with the team. His first match was against the Seoul Dynasty; the Valiant won, 4–0, and Halpern was named the player of the match. The Valiant hit their stride after that match, going 7–3 in Stage 3, qualifying for their first stage playoffs in the process, and subsequently, went 9–1 in Stage 4 and won the Stage 4 finals against the New York Excelsior. Additionally, the team made a deep run into the 2018 playoffs. Halpern was selected as a reserve for the 2018 Overwatch League All-Star Game and 2019 Overwatch League All-Star Game.

In October 2019, The Valiant announced that they had parted ways with Halpern.

=== Los Angeles Gladiators ===
Halpern signed with the Los Angeles Gladiators ahead of the 2020 season. He was selected as All-Star in 2020, marking the third consecutive year that he received the commendation. Halpern picked up his second OWL midseason tournament title in 2021, after the Gladiators defeated the Chengdu Hunters in the Countdown Cup finals. At the end of the 2021 season, he received a Role Star commendation, an award given to the top players in each role.

== National team career ==
After his first year in the OWL, Halpern was selected as a member of Team USA in the 2018 Overwatch World Cup (OWWC). In the group stage, Team USA finished as the top seed, advancing them to the knockout round. Team USA fell to Team United Kingdom in the quarterfinals, 1–3.

The following year, Halpern was again selected to play for Team USA in the 2019 Overwatch World Cup. Team USA went undefeated in the group stage to advance to the knockouts, where they defeated Sweden, the United Kingdom, and South Korea to advance to the OWWC finals. The US team swept Team China in the finals, 3–0, giving the US their first OWWC title.
