= List of Seoul Dynasty players =

Seoul Dynasty is a South Korean esports team founded in 2017 that competes in the Overwatch League (OWL). The Dynasty began playing competitive Overwatch in the 2018 season.

All rostered players during the OWL season (including the playoffs) are included, even if they did not make an appearance.

== All-time roster ==
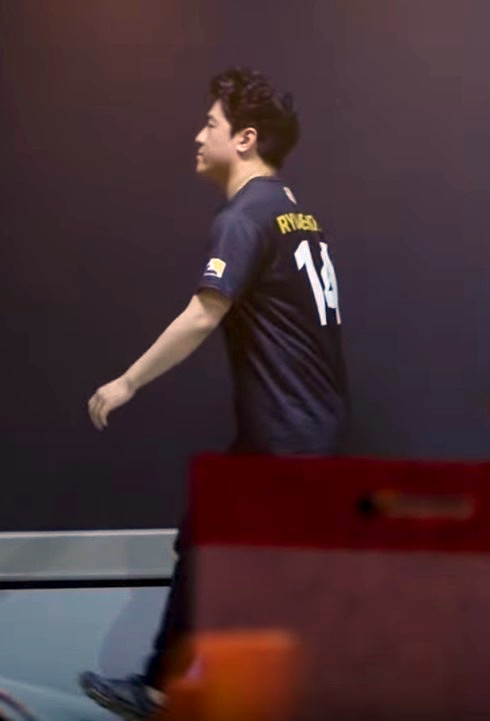
Ryu "ryujehong" Je-hong

As of September 30, 2022

Handle	Name	Role	Country	Seasons	Ref.
Anamo	Taesung Jung	Support	South Korea	2021	
Bdosin	Seungtae Choi	Support	South Korea	2020	
Bunny	Junhyeok Chae	Damage	South Korea	2018	
Creative	Youngwan Kim	Support	South Korea	2020–2022	
Fissure	Chanhyeong Baek	Tank	South Korea	2019	
FITS	Dongeon Kim	Damage	South Korea	2019–present	
Fleta	Byung-sun Kim	Damage	South Korea	2018–2019	
Gambler	Jinwoo Heo	Support	South Korea	2018	
Gesture	Jaehui Hong	Tank	South Korea	2020–2021	
Gido	Gido Moon	Support	South Korea	2018	
Highly	Sunghyeok Lee	Support	South Korea	2019	
ILLICIT	Jaemin Park	Damage	South Korea	2019–2020	
Ir1s	Seunghyun Kim	Support	South Korea	2022–present	
Jecse	Seungsoo Lee	Support	South Korea	2019	
KuKi	Daekuk Kim	Tank	South Korea	2018	
Marve1	Minseo Hwang	Tank	South Korea	2019–2021	
Michelle	Minhyuk Choi	Tank	South Korea	2019–2020	
Miro	Jinhyuk Gong	Tank	South Korea	2018	
Munchkin	Sangbeom Byun	Damage	South Korea	2018–2019	
Profit	Junyoung Park	Damage	South Korea	2020–present	
ryujehong	Jehong Ryu	Support	South Korea	2018–2019	
Saebyeolbe	Jongryeol Park	Damage	South Korea	2021	
SLIME	Sungjun Kim	Support	South Korea	2020	
smurf	Myeonghwan Yoo	Tank	South Korea	2022–present	
Stalk3r	Hakyong Jeong	Damage	South Korea	2022–present	
tobi	Jinmo Yang	Support	South Korea	2018–2020	
Toyou	Hyunwoo Lim	Tank	South Korea	2020–2021	
Vindaim	Junwoo Park	Support	South Korea	2022–present	
Wekeed	Seokwoo Choi	Damage	South Korea	2018	
xepheR	Jaemo Koo	Tank	South Korea	2018	
zunba	Joonhyeok Kim	Tank	South Korea	2018–2019	
