= Ryujehong =

South Korean professional esports player (born 1991)

ryujehong
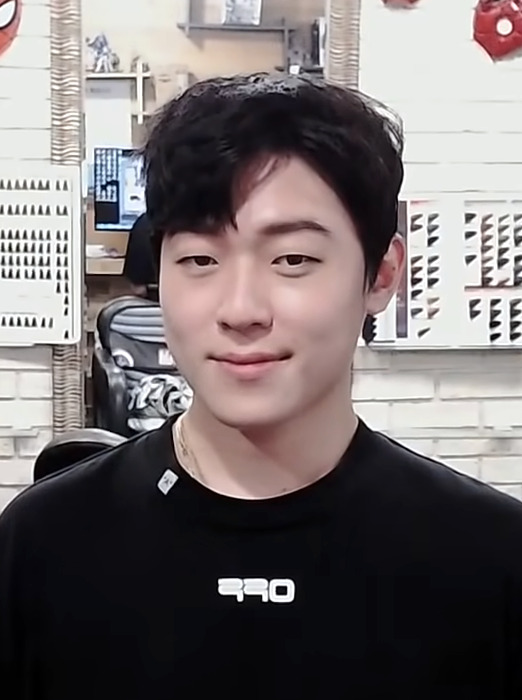
- Ryu in 2021

Personal information
- Name: 류제홍 (Ryu Je-hong)
- Born: September 5, 1991 (age 35)
- Nationality: South Korean

Career information
- Games: Counter-Strike; Special Force II; Overwatch
- Playing career: 2010–2014, 2016–2020
- Role: Support
- Number: 14

Team history
- Counter-Strike
- 2010–2012: Lunatic-Hai
- Special Force 2
- 2012–2013: STX SouL
- Overwatch
- 2016–2017: Lunatic-Hai
- 2018–2019: Seoul Dynasty
- 2020: Vancouver Titans

Career highlights and awards
- 2× APEX champion; 2× OWWC champion (2016, 2017); 2× APEX Most Valuable Player; 2× OWL All-Star (2018, 2019); No. 14 retired by Seoul Dynasty

Ryu Je-hong (Korean: 류제홍, born September 5, 1991), better known mononymously as ryujehong, is a South Korean former professional esports player, best known for his career as an Overwatch player. During his Overwatch career, he played for the Seoul Dynasty and Vancouver Titans in the Overwatch League (OWL), and prior to the OWL's inception, he played for Lunatic-Hai in Overwatch Apex.

Ryu began his esports career playing Counter-Strike for South Korean team Lunatic-Hai in 2010. He then transitioned to playing Special Force II, where he won Special Force 2 Pro League Season 2 finals with team STX SouL in 2012. After the Special Force 2 Pro League shut down, Ryu left to complete his mandatory military service in 2014. After returning from his military service in 2016, Ryu joined Lunatic-Hai's Overwatch team and competed in Overwatch Apex. From 2016 to 2017, Ryu won two Apex titles, was named the Apex most valuable player twice, won two Overwatch World Cup titles with team South Korea, and was widely regarded as the world's best Ana player. In late 2017, he joined the Seoul Dynasty for the inaugural season of the Overwatch League. He played with the Dynasty in the 2018 and 2019 seasons, being named an OWL All-Star in both, before signing with the Vancouver Titans ahead of the 2020 season. Four games into the 2020 season, he was released, along with the entire Titans roster.

Ryu transitioned to a career in content creation, signing with Gen.G in early 2021. However, he was indefinitely suspended from the organization shortly afterwards due to offensive comments he made on stream towards his female co-streamer.

== Early life ==
Ryu was born on September 5, 1991. In his youth, he preferred playing arcade games, and the first PC game he played was Counter-Strike. He made the decision to become a professional gamer when he was in seventh grade. The first tournament he competed in was the World Cyber Games Korea qualifiers, when he was in eighth grade.

== Professional career ==
=== Pre-Overwatch ===
Ryu began his professional esports career in 2010 as a Counter-Strike player for South Korean team Lunatic-Hai. He then transitioned to playing Special Force 2 and was a part of the STX SouL team that defeated SK Telecom, 3–0, in the Special Force 2 Pro League Season 2 finals in September 2012. After the Special Force 2 Pro League shut down, Ryu played other first-person shooters before leaving for his mandatory military service in 2014. Ryu was discharged from his military service on May 25, 2016, a day after the global release of Overwatch.

=== Lunatic-Hai ===
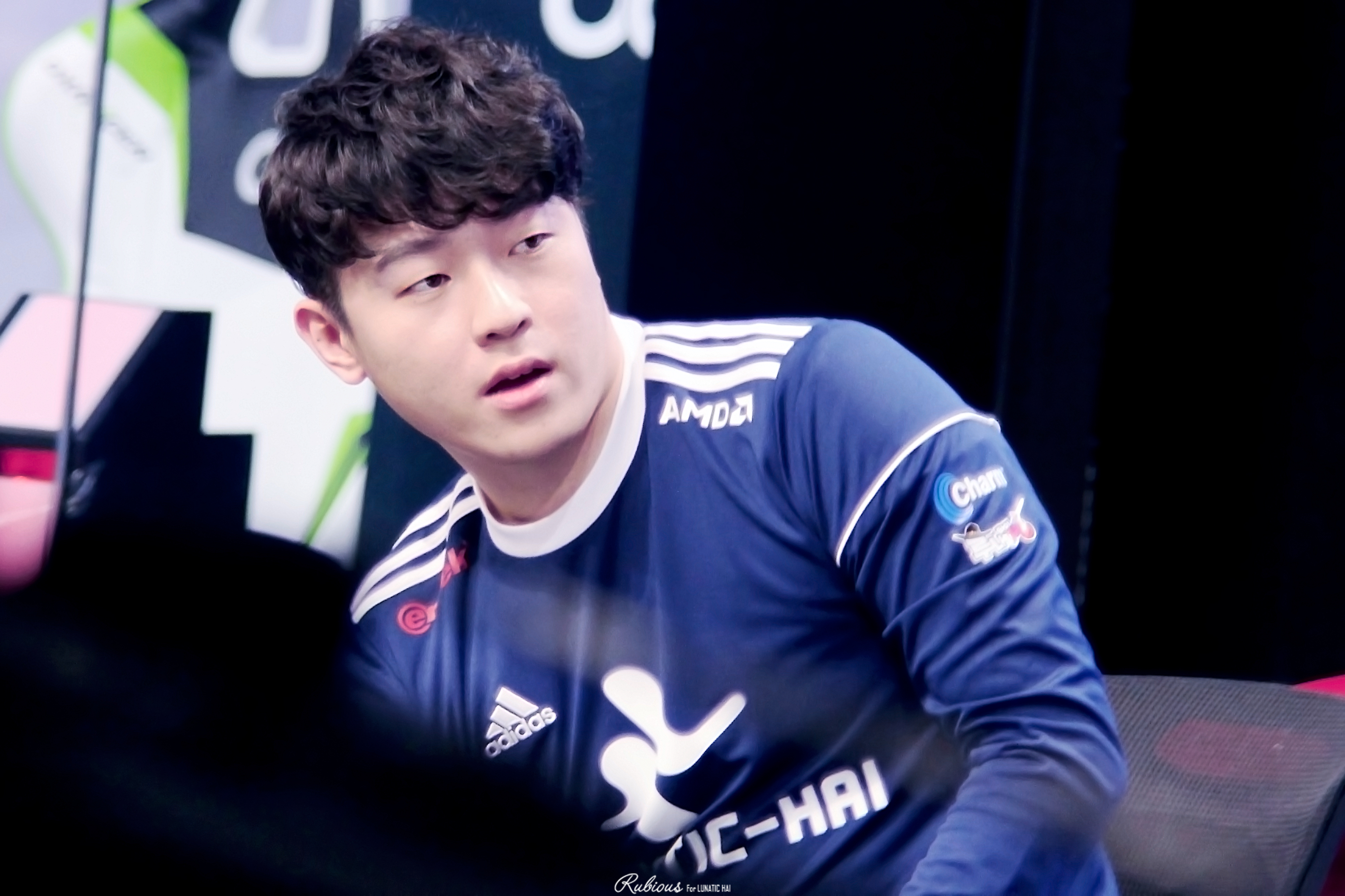
Ryu played for the Lunatic Hai from 2016 to 2017.

In October 2016, Ryu returned to Lunatic-Hai, competing as a support in their Overwatch division. Through the remainder of the year, he and the team competed in several tournament series, including China's APAC Premier 2016 and South Korea's Overwatch Apex Season 1. While the team did not pick up a title in either one, Ryu was widely considered the world's best Ana player. Ryu picked up his first Apex title on April 8, 2017, after Lunatic-Hai defeated RunAway, 4–3, in the Apex Season 2 finals. Additionally, he was named the season's most valuable player. Ryu carried his success into the following season, claiming the Apex Season 3 title after defeating KongDoo Panthera, 4–3, in the finals on July 29, 2017, and again was named the season's most valuable player. In Season 4, Ryu did not play in Lunatic-Hai's win over Meta Athena that advanced them to the second group stage. While he returned to the lineup afterwards, a loss to GC Busan in the second group stage ended their season. At the end of 2017, Ryu was nominated for The Game Awards 2017 Best Esports Player.

=== Seoul Dynasty ===
In August 2017, Blizzard Entertainment announced that KSV Esports had signed Ryu, along with many other members of Lunatic-Hai, for their team representing Seoul, later branded revealed as the Seoul Dynasty, in the upcoming Overwatch League (OWL).

Ryu was named the team captain and played his first regular season match on opening day, January 10, 2018, that resulted in a win over the Dallas Fuel. The Dynasty elected to bench Ryu in their match against the London Spitfire on February 1; the team lost the series 0–4, marking the first time that they had been swept in a match. Throughout the first half of the season, Ryu mainly played as Zenyatta, an offensive-driven support character, rather than Ana; despite many expecting him to be the top support player in the league, it was clear that New York Excelsior's Bang "JJonak" Sung-hyeon would be taking that title. In their first game after midpoint of the season, on April 4, the Dynasty once again benched Ryu, and once again, they suffered a 0–4 loss — this time to the Los Angeles Valiant. He played outside of his role in a match on May 4 against the Spitfire, playing as the tank character Winston, and despite not performing great in his new role, the Dynasty continued to play him as a tank for several more matches. At the end of the season, Ryu was selected as a starter for the 2018 All-Star Game.

The following season, Ryu was selected as a starter for the 2019 All-Star Game. After the conclusion of the 2019 season, Ryu was listed as a free agent; after, Seoul Dynasty COO Arnold Hur announced that the franchise had retired his number 14 jersey.

=== Vancouver Titans ===
On November 27, 2019, the Vancouver Titans announced that they had signed Ryu for the upcoming 2020 season. Many expected that he would split playing time behind Titan's support player Lee "Twilight" Ju-seok, who was an MVP nominee the previous season. However, on May 6, 2020, four matches into the season, the Titans released their entire roster following ongoing disputes between the organization's management and players. That same day, Ryu said that his time with the organization was "life was hell for 25 days" and announced that he would be taking a break from professional Overwatch.

== National team career ==
Ryu was selected as a member of Team South Korea for the first Overwatch World Cup (OWWC). Team South Korea ran through the entire tournament, ultimately defeating Team Russia, 4–0, in the World Cup final on November 6, 2016. As one of the first major Overwatch competitions in history, it was at this point when Ryu became known as one of the top Overwatch players in the world. The following year, Ryu was selected to represent Team South Korea 2017 Overwatch World Cup. He picked up his second OWWC title after Team South Korea defeated Team Canada, 4–1, in the World Cup finals on November 4, 2017.

== Content creation ==
On January 12, 2021, Gen.G, parent group of the Seoul Dynasty, announced that they had brought on Ryu as a content creator for Overwatch. On a Twitch stream days later, Ryu was co-streaming with a female streamer. While apparently drunk, he made several sexist and offensive comments towards his co-streamer. Ryu issued two apologies, and Gen.G indefinitely suspended all of Ryu's team-related activities on January 19.
