= Saebyeolbe =

South Korean professional Overwatch player (born 1995/1996)

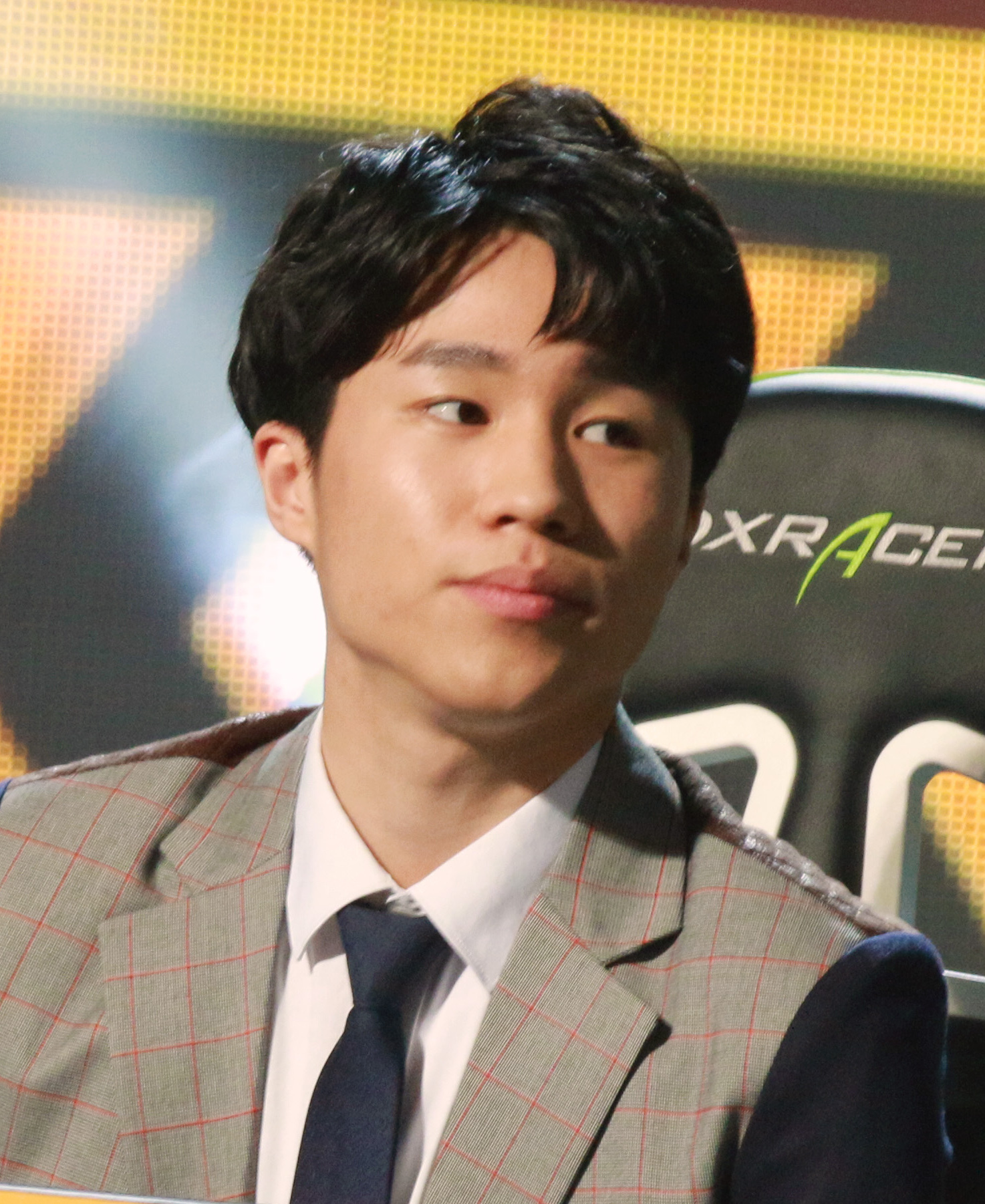
- Park in 2016

Personal information
- Name: 박종렬 (Park Jong-ryeol)
- Born: December 23, 1995 (age 30); Seoul, South Korea

Career information
- Game: Overwatch
- Playing career: 2016–2021
- Role: Damage
- Number: 9, 56

Team history
- 2016–2017: LW Blue
- 2018–2020: New York Excelsior
- 2021: Seoul Dynasty

Career highlights and awards
- OWL All-Star (2018); OWWC champion (2017); No. 9 retired by New York Excelsior

Park Jong-ryeol (Korean: 박종렬; born December 13, 1995), better known by his online alias Saebyeolbe, is a South Korean former professional Overwatch player. In his prime, he was considered one of the world's best Tracer players. During his career, he played in the Overwatch League (OWL) for the New York Excelsior and Seoul Dynasty and in Overwatch Apex for AIM Arrow and LuxuryWatch (LW) Blue.

A native of Seoul, South Korea, he began his Overwatch career playing on South Korean amateur teams such as Team Square and AIM Arrow, and shortly after, he joined Park joined LW Blue, in 2016. In 2017, Park signed with the New York Excelsior for the league's inaugural season. He reached all four stage finals in the season, winning two, and was named an OWL All-Star. After three seasons with the Excelsior, he signed with the Seoul Dynasty. In his first season with the Dynasty, all four of the Chinese teams of the OWL boycotted all events that Park was involved with after he criticized the lack of free speech imposed by the Chinese government. Having not played a match thereafter, Park retired on October 10, 2021.

Park represented South Korea at the 2017 Overwatch World Cup, winning the title with the team that year. He again represented South Korea at the 2018 World Cup, but he was replaced in the roster after advancing past the group stage.

== Professional career ==
=== Early career ===
Park's first team was Team Square, an amateur team that competed remotely, where he played with his damage partner Kim "Rascal" Dong-jun. Shortly after, he left the team and joined AIM Arrow, a team that attempted to qualify the South Korean tournament series Overwatch Apex. He made his competitive debut in a 0–3 loss to Lunatic-Hai.

In late 2016, Park joined LuxuryWatch (LW) Blue. and played in Season 1 of Overwatch Apex. In December 2016, he played with LW Blue's sister team, LW Red, at the Overwatch Intel Extreme Masters Gyeonggi Invitational. He and the team went on to win the tournament, defeating Lunatic-Hai in the finals by a score of 3–1. Back with LW Blue thereafter, the team had their best performance in Apex Season 2. LW Blue defeated KongDoo Panthera in the season playoff quarterfinals behind a dominant performance by Park on the tank Roadhog. The team faced RunAway in the semifinals on March 24, 2017; however, despite a strong performance by Park on Roadhog and Tracer, the team lost, 2–3. The team went on to defeat Meta Athena, 3–1, in the third-place match.

=== New York Excelsior ===
In August 2017, ESPN reported that Sterling.VC, an investment fund backed by Sterling Equities, had purchased the roster of LW Blue to compete in their New York franchise, later revealed as the New York Excelsior, for the inaugural season of the Overwatch League; Park was named the team's captain. Park led the Excelsior to all four stage finals of the season, winning two of them over the Philadelphia Fusion, 3–2, in Stage 2 and the Boston Uprising, 3–0, in Stage 3. However, Park's performance began to wane in Stage 4, as the meta in the league shifted from a fast-paced "dive" composition to favoring a double-sniper composition centered around Hanzo and Widowmaker; Park was often benched thereafter for teammate Kim "Pine" Do-hyeon. The team finished with a league-best 34–6 record. New York received a bye into the semifinals of the season playoffs, where they faced the Philadelphia Fusion in a best-of-three series. Park found playing time in the matches, but the Excelsior lost the first two series, 0–3 and 2–3. At the end of the season, Park was named a starter for the 2018 All-Star game.

In the beginning of the 2019 season, the composition that teams frequently ran was three tanks and three supports (known as the GOATS meta). As a damage player, Park was on the bench for a majority Stage 1, playing a total of 13 minutes and 33 second for the entire stage. Not finding much playtime in Stage 2 either, Park considered retiring, stating in an interview, "It felt like GOATS wasn't going to end. My best hero is Tracer, and when I couldn't play her anymore, I felt empty inside. I did think about quitting." Park returned to the starting lineup in Stage 3, when the team utilized him playing as Sombra; New York had their best stage of the season, going a perfect 7–0. In Stage 4 of the season, the league implemented a role lock, forcing teams to play two tank, two damage, and two support heroes, and Park shifted to primarily play as Reaper and Bastion. However, New York had their worst stage, going 3–4. In the playoffs, Park's Bastion play was solid, but his performance on Reaper was criticized; New York finished in third place after losing to the San Francisco Shock, 0–4 in the lower bracket finals.

Park did not get much playing time in the 2020 season, often being benched due to the metas that were present, and he was released from the team after the end of the season.

=== Seoul Dynasty ===
Park was picked up by the Seoul Dynasty in late November 2020. On April 12, 2021, while streaming on Twitch, Park commented on his frustration in trying to appeal to a Chinese audience when he was streaming on DouYu, a Chinese streaming platform. Park said, translated to English, "I can't say Taiwan and [Hong Kong]. At all. They (China) don't recognize them as countries. I got into so much trouble for saying their names. Make it make sense. What are you talking about, 'One China?' So I objected to that and all the managers said, 'If you want to earn Chinese money, you have to become a Chinese dog.' So that's what I'm doing right now. I can even say, 'Thanks for subscribing' in Chinese. Aren't I good at Chinese?" Two days after the comments, Park apologized via a handwritten note on Instagram. Nearly three weeks after the apology, the four Chinese teams of the Overwatch League — the Shanghai Dragons, Chengdu Hunters, Hangzhou Spark, and Guangzhou Charge — announced that they would not participate in any Overwatch League event in which Park was present. On May 6, the Overwatch League issued a statement announcing that the Chinese teams would no longer be boycotting Park nor the Seoul Dynasty. Park did not appear in any matches thereafter. After the conclusion of the 2021 season, on October 10, 2021, Park retired from professional Overwatch.

== National team career ==
Park was selected as a member of Team South Korea for the 2017 Overwatch World Cup. He and Team South Korea went on to claim the World Cup title, defeating Team Canada, 4–1, in the finals on November 4, 2017. Park was again selected as a member of seven-player Team South Korea for the 2018 World Cup and was the only member on the roster who had previously represented South Korea at a World Cup. After the team advanced past the group stage, Kim "Fleta" Byung-sun took over Park's spot on the roster due to undisclosed reasons.

== Player profile ==
Park primarily played damage heroes, and he was often described as one of the best Tracer — a highly mobile character — players in the world. Park's effectiveness on the hero came from his ability to quickly eliminate the enemy support players, while being able to anticipate and outmaneuver any enemy Tracer players' actions. Park also showed patience when using Tracer's pulse bomb ability, an explosive that sticks to an opponent if thrown on them, often using it on the most threatening target in the fight or combining it with one of his teammates' abilities to maximize its value. Although he showed proficiency in playing other heroes such as Sombra and Widowmaker, he was deficient in his ability to play a wide range of heroes.

== Personal life ==
Park was born on December 13, 1995, and was raised in Seoul, South Korea. His parents separated while when he was 11, and he and his sister lived with his mother thereafter. While he was in middle school, his mother pushed him in to bowling, and Park eventually became a professional bowler for four years.

Park accumulated 5,000 hours of play in the video game Counter-Strike: Global Offensive by the age of 17 and considered playing professionally, but instead, he began working as a barista. Shortly after, he left to complete his mandatory military service; however, he was discharged early after he broke his knee. With his physical abilities limited due to his injury, Park began playing Overwatch and began quickly ascending up the game's competitive ladder. Park got married in late 2017, but three months after getting married, he moved to Los Angeles for the Overwatch League, while his wife stayed in South Korea, although by June 2018, he and his wife lived together in an apartment. During the OWL's first season, Park played with a picture of his wife next to his computer as a "good luck charm."

Park threw the first pitch at the July 25, 2018, New York Mets game, becoming the first esports player to throw an opening pitch in a Major League Baseball game. In May 2020, Andbox released a capsule collection around Park and his mantra of "Be nice"; less than one day after the launch, all but one article of clothing were sold out.
