= 2019 Overwatch League All-Star Game =

2019 OWL All-Star Game
Atlantic Division	Pacific Division
4	1
- Date: May 16, 2019
- Venue: Blizzard Arena, Burbank, California, US

Live Broadcast
- Broadcast(s): ESPN2; Twitch

The 2019 Overwatch League All-Star Game was the second Overwatch League (OWL) All-Star Game that matched the top players in the Atlantic Division (ATL) against those in the Pacific Division (PAC). The game was played on May 16, 2019 at Blizzard Arena in Burbank, California and was the culmination of the league's 2019 All-Star Weekend.

== All-Star Game ==
=== Roster selection ===
The rosters and coaches for the All-Star Game were selected through a voting process. In order to be eligible for selection, a player must have played at least 10 regular season games or participated in the 2018 All Star Game. The starters were chosen by the fans, with voting beginning on March 16 and ending on April 28. Fans were allowed to vote for a maximum of two DPS, two tank, and two support players from each division. After the starting rosters were announced, an additional 12 players from each division were selected as reserves by Overwatch League players, coaches, casters, and staffers. The starting roster was revealed in early May, with the full roster being revealed in mid-May.

Atlantic Division All-Stars
Handle	Name	Team
Starters
JJonak	Bang Seong-hyun	New York Excelsior
ArK	Hong Yeon-jun	Washington Justice
Carpe	Lee Jae-hyeok	Philadelphia Fusion
Pine	Kim Do-hyeon	New York Excelsior
Poko	Gael Gouzerch	Philadelphia Fusion
Fusions	Cameron Bosworth	Boston Uprising
Reserves
Anamo	Jung Tae-Sung	New York Excelsior
Dogman	Dusttin Bowerman	Atlanta Reign
Kruise	Harrison Pond	Paris Eternal
Neko	Park Se-Hyun	Toronto Defiant
Mano	Kim Dong-Gyu	New York Excelsior
Fury	Kim Jun-Ho	London Spitfire
Gesture	Hong Jae-Hui	London Spitfire
Meko	Kim Tae-Hong	New York Excelsior
Profit	Park Jun-Young	London Spitfire
Nenne	Jeong Yeon-Gwan	New York Excelsior
Sayaplayer	Ha Jeong-Woo	Florida Mayhem
Danteh	Dante Cruz	Houston Outlaws
Head coach: Yu "Pavane" Hyeon-sang (New York Excelsior)

Pacific Division All-Stars
Handle	Name	Team
Starters
ryujehong	Ryu Je-hong	Seoul Dynasty
Yveltal	Li Xianyao	Chengdu Hunters
Ameng	Menghan Ding	Chengdu Hunters
guxue	Qiulin Xu	Hangzhou Spark
JinMu	Yi Hu	Chengdu Hunters
Fleta	Kim Byung-sun	Seoul Dynasty
Reserves
Slime	Kim Seong-Jun	Vancouver Titans
Viol2t	Park Min-Ki	San Francisco Shock
Shu	Kim Jin-Seo	Guangzhou Charge
Twilight	Lee Ju-Seok	Vancouver Titans
Super	Matthew DeLisi	San Francisco Shock
Bumper	Park Sang-Beom	Vancouver Titans
OGE	Son Min-Seok	Dallas Fuel
Space	Indy Halpern	Los Angeles Valiant
sinatraa	Jay Won	San Francisco Shock
Haksal	Kim Hyo-Jong	Vancouver Titans
Decay	Jang Gui-Un	Los Angeles Gladiators
Diem	Bae Min-Sung	Shanghai Dragons
Head coach: Hwang "PaJion" Ji-sub (Vancouver Titans)

=== Game summary ===
All-Star Game	May 16	Atlantic Division	4	–	1	Pacific Division	Burbank, CA
	6:00 pm PST						Blizzard Arena
		2	Nepal			0	
		3	King's Row			2	
		2	Paris			1	
		1	Dorado			2	
		2	Busan			0	

== All-Star Weekend ==
=== Talent Takedown ===
The Atlantic and Pacific coaches were to draft teams consisting of three casters and analysts and three all-stars, and square off in a 6v6 best-of-three series that included lockout elimination, escort and control. The format was changed, however, to only allow casters and analysts to play.

Atlantic Division
Handle	Name
Puckett	Chris Puckett
Sideshow	Josh Wilkinson
Soe	Soe Gschwind
Bren	Brennon Hook
MonteCristo	Christopher Mykles
Doa	Erik Lonnquist
Hexagrams	Robert Kirkbride

Pacific Division
Handle	Name
Danny	Danny Lim
Mr X	Matt Morello
Uber	Mitch Leslie
Wolf	Wolf Schröder
Achilios	Seth King
Micachu	Mica Burton
Semmler	Auguste Massonnat

Talent Takedown	May 15	Atlantic Division	2	–	1	Pacific Division	Burbank, CA
	6:00 pm PST						Blizzard Arena
		3	Necropolis			0	
		4	Watchpoint: Gibraltar			3	
		0	Lijang Tower			2	

=== Widowmaker 1v1 ===
The Widowmaker 1v1 included the top four Widowmaker players, selected and seeded by the All-Star team coaches, from both divisions against one another in a single-elimination bracket. Eliminations were head-shot only, and automatic firing was disabled. The quarterfinals and semifinal were inter-division, and the finals were an Atlantic vs. Pacific championship match. The maps were Castillo for the quarterfinals, Necropolis for the semifinals, and Ecopoint: Antarctica for the finals.

Quarterfinals; Castillo
Pine	7
JJonak	2
Atlantic Division
Carpe	6
Nenne	7
Viol2t	0
Diem	7
Pacific Division
Fleta	7
Shu	3

Semifinal; Necropolis
Pine	6
Nenne	7
Diem	7
Fleta	4

Finals; Ecopoint: Antarctica
Nenne	5
Diem	9

=== All-Star Arcade ===
The All-Star Arcade had fans vote for which game mode they would like to see during the All-Star Weekend. Voting took place on April 26; the events that the fans voted for were:

- Sibling Rivalry – 6v6. Three Genjis and three Hanzos per team. Assault (Hanamura).
- Healers Never Die – 6v6. Supports only. One hero limit. Control (Nepal).
- Terrible, Terrible Damage – 6v6. Damage only. One hero limit. Hybrid (Hollywood).
- Keeping the Peace – 6v6. McCree only. Escort (Route 66).
- Thanks, but No Tanks – 6v6. No tanks. One hero limit. Hybrid (Blizzard World).

The event was sponsored by State Farm.

All-Star Arcade	May 15	Atlantic Division	1	–	3	Pacific Division	Burbank, CA
	8:30 pm PST						Blizzard Arena
		1	Hanamura			2	
		1	Nepal			2	
		3	Hollywood			2	
		1	Route 66			2	

== Broadcasting ==
The entire All-Star Weekend was televised nationally by ESPN2 and live-streamed on Twitch and Overwatch League website.
