= 2026 Overwatch World Cup =

Esports tournament

Tournament information
- Game: Overwatch
- Location: Busan, South Korea (groups); Anaheim, California (knockouts)
- Dates: May 29–September 13, 2026
- Administrator: Blizzard Entertainment
- Tournament format(s): Round-robin and Knockout
- Venue(s): Busan Esports Arena; Anaheim Convention Center
- Teams: 30

Final positions
- Champions: South Korea
- 1st runner-up: Saudi Arabia
- 2nd runner-up: France

The 2026 Overwatch World Cup (OWWC) is the sixth edition of the Overwatch World Cup, an Overwatch esports tournament, organized by the game's developer Blizzard Entertainment. A total of 52 teams from various countries and regions competed for one of the 30 spots in the 2026 OWWC main tournament. The group stage is being played at the Busan Esports Arena in Busan, South Korea, from August 20 to 23. The knockout stage will be played at the Anaheim Convention Center in Anaheim, California, during BlizzCon from September 12 to 13, 2026.

South Korea won the tournament for the fourth time on September 13th, defeating Saudi Arabia 4-1. Saudi Arabia were the defending champions, having won the previous edition of the tournament in 2023.

== Background ==
=== Committees and players ===
Each participating country is represented by a three-person competition committee consisting of a general manager, head coach, and social lead. The committees are responsible for managing their respective national teams and overseeing team operations and are eligible to receive an equal share of any prize money earned by their country's World Cup team. Applications opened in November 2025 and were originally scheduled to close on January 16, 2026, before the deadline was extended to February 6. The team-selection process began in Spring 2026, with committees assembling their national rosters ahead of the regional Conference Cups in March 2026.

=== Format ===
The main tournament of the 2026 Overwatch World Cup is divided into three stages: online qualifiers, group stage, and knockout stage. It was preceded by the Conference Cups, a series of online tournaments contested by 33 wildcard teams. Three teams from the Americas, five from EMEA, and three from Asia advanced from the Conference cup to join 19 invited teams in the main tournament. Twenty-eight teams competed in the online qualifiers, which were divided into seven four-team regional groups: two each for the Americas and Asia and three for EMEA. The top two teams from each group advanced to the group stage. Defending champions Saudi Arabia and 2023 runners-up China received direct berths to the group stage, for a total of 16 teams. In the group stage, the 16 teams were divided into four groups of four and competed in a single round-robin format. The top two teams from each group advanced to the eight-team finals at BlizzCon 2026, which will be contested as a single-elimination bracket.

== Venues ==
Busan, South Korea	Anaheim, United States
Group Stage	Knockout Stage
Busan Esports Arena	Anaheim Convention Center
Capacity: 330	Capacity: 7,500
2026 Overwatch World Cup is located in South Korea	2026 Overwatch World Cup is located in the United States

== Qualification ==
A total of 52 countries and regions participated in the 2026 Overwatch World Cup. Of these, 30 teams qualified for the main tournament, consisting of 19 invited teams and 11 wildcard teams. The invited teams were selected from the top 16 teams at the 2023 OWWC, along with the three highest-performing teams from EMEA. The remaining 11 teams qualified through the Conference Cups, a new qualification pathway introduced for the 2026 OWWC.

=== Online qualifiers ===
==== Americas ====
Group A

Pos	Team	Pld	W	L	PCT	MW	ML	MD	Qualification
1	Canada	3	3	0	1.000	9	2	+7	Advance to group stage
2	Colombia	3	2	1	0.667	6	4	+2	Advance to group stage
3	Puerto Rico	3	1	2	0.333	4	7	−3	
4	Brazil	3	0	3	0.000	3	9	−6	

Source: Overwatch Esports

Group B

Pos	Team	Pld	W	L	PCT	MW	ML	MD	Qualification
1	United States	3	3	0	1.000	9	0	+9	Advance to group stage
2	Mexico	3	2	1	0.667	6	5	+1	Advance to group stage
3	Chile	3	1	2	0.333	4	7	−3	
4	Argentina	3	0	3	0.000	2	9	−7	

Source: Overwatch Esports

==== Europe and Middle East ====
Group A

Pos	Team	Pld	W	L	PCT	MW	ML	MD	Qualification
1	Sweden	3	3	0	1.000	9	1	+8	Advance to group stage
2	Denmark	3	2	1	0.667	6	5	+1	Advance to group stage
3	Austria	3	1	2	0.333	3	7	−4	
4	Finland	3	0	3	0.000	4	9	−5	

Source: Overwatch Esports

Group B

Pos	Team	Pld	W	L	PCT	MW	ML	MD	Qualification
1	Germany	3	3	0	1.000	9	1	+8	Advance to group stage
2	Great Britain	3	2	1	0.667	7	3	+4	Advance to group stage
3	Norway	3	1	2	0.333	3	7	−4	
4	Portugal	3	0	3	0.000	1	9	−8	

Source: Overwatch Esports

Group C

Pos	Team	Pld	W	L	PCT	MW	ML	MD	Qualification
1	France	3	3	0	1.000	9	0	+9	Advance to group stage
2	Spain	3	2	1	0.667	6	4	+2	Advance to group stage
3	Poland	3	1	2	0.333	3	7	−4	
4	Ireland	3	0	3	0.000	2	9	−7	

Source: Overwatch Esports

==== Asia-Pacific ====
Group A

Pos	Team	Pld	W	L	PCT	MW	ML	MD	Qualification
1	South Korea	3	3	0	1.000	9	0	+9	Advance to group stage
2	Japan	3	2	1	0.667	6	3	+3	Advance to group stage
3	Hong Kong	3	1	2	0.333	3	7	−4	
4	Pakistan	3	0	3	0.000	1	9	−8	

Source: Overwatch Esports

Group B

Pos	Team	Pld	W	L	PCT	MW	ML	MD	Qualification
1	Australia	3	3	0	1.000	9	1	+8	Advance to group stage
2	Thailand	3	2	1	0.667	6	3	+3	Advance to group stage
3	Philippines	3	1	2	0.333	4	6	−2	
4	India	3	0	3	0.000	0	9	−9	

Source: Overwatch Esports

=== Qualified teams ===
Automatically qualified Qualified Did not qualify Did not participate

Automatically qualified (2)

- China
- Saudi Arabia

Americas (4)

- Canada
- Colombia
- Mexico
- United States

EMEA (6)

- Denmark
- France
- Germany
- Great Britain
- Spain
- Sweden

Asia-Pacific (4)

- Australia
- Japan
- South Korea
- Thailand

== Group stage ==
The group stage ran from August 20 to 23, 2026, and was a LAN event in Busan, South Korea. A total of 16 teams were divided into four groups, and each group competed in a round-robin tournament in a first-to-three series. The top two teams from each group advanced to the knockouts.

=== Group A ===
Pos	Team	Pld	W	L	PCT	MW	ML	MD	Qualification
1	United States	3	3	0	1.000	9	3	+6	Advance to knockout stage
2	Sweden	3	2	1	0.667	8	4	+4	Advance to knockout stage
3	China	3	1	2	0.333	5	6	−1	
4	Japan	3	0	3	0.000	0	9	−9	

Source: Overwatch Esports

Match 1	August 19	China	1	–	3	United States	Busan, South Korea
	12:30 am EDT	Recap					Busan Esports Arena
		0	Busan			2	
		1	Neon Junction			2	
		3	Aatlis			2	
		2	Route 66			3	

Match 2	August 20	Sweden	3	–	0	Japan	Busan, South Korea
	8:00 am EDT	Recap					Busan Esports Arena
		2	Nepal			0	
		2	Shambali Monastery			0	
		2	Paraíso			1	

Match 3	August 20	United States	3	–	0	Japan	Busan, South Korea
	11:30 pm EDT	Recap					Busan Esports Arena
		2	Nepal			0	
		2	Paraíso			0	
		3	Aatlis			0	

Match 4	August 21	China	1	–	3	Sweden	Busan, South Korea
	1:20 am EDT	Recap					Busan Esports Arena
		1	Nepal			2	
		2	Aatlis			3	
		2	Paraíso			1	
		18.72	Esperança			142.41	

Match 5	August 21	United States	3	–	2	Sweden	Busan, South Korea
	10:00 pm EDT	Recap					Busan Esports Arena
		0	Nepal			2	
		3	Route 66			2	
		2	Neon Junction			3	
		3	Aatlis			1	
		97.83	Esperança			97.82	

Match 6	August 22	China	3	–	0	Japan	Busan, South Korea
	5:35 am EDT	Recap					Busan Esports Arena
		2	Nepal			0	
		3	Suravasa			2	
		142.41	Esperança			0	

=== Group B ===
Pos	Team	Pld	W	L	PCT	MW	ML	MD	Qualification
1	Saudi Arabia	3	3	0	1.000	9	0	+9	Advance to knockout stage
2	Australia	3	2	1	0.667	6	6	0	Advance to knockout stage
3	Great Britain	3	1	2	0.333	4	6	−2	
4	Mexico	3	0	3	0.000	2	9	−7	

Source: Overwatch Esports

Match 1	August 19	Mexico	0	–	3	Great Britain	Busan, South Korea
	10:15 pm EDT	Recap					Busan Esports Arena
		0	Nepal			2	
		0	Aatlis			3	
		1	Eichenwalde			2	

Match 2	August 20	Saudi Arabia	3	–	0	Australia	Busan, South Korea
	2:15 am EDT	Recap					Busan Esports Arena
		2	Nepal			0	
		2	Eichenwalde			1	
		142.41	Esperança			0	

Match 3	August 21	Saudi Arabia	3	–	0	Mexico	Busan, South Korea
	3:00 am EDT	Recap					Busan Esports Arena
		2	Nepal			0	
		1	Junkertown			0	
		139.62	Colosseo			17.85	

Match 4	August 21	Australia	3	–	1	Great Britain	Busan, South Korea
	4:25 am EDT	Recap					Busan Esports Arena
		2	Nepal			1	
		0	Junkertown			3	
		3	Neon Junction			2	
		3	Aatlis			1	

Match 5	August 23	Saudi Arabia	3	–	0	Great Britain	Busan, South Korea
	3:00 am EDT	Recap					Busan Esports Arena
		2	Nepal			0	
		1	Junkertown			0	
		3	New Junk City			2	

Match 6	August 23	Australia	3	–	2	Mexico	Busan, South Korea
	4:00 am EDT	Recap					Busan Esports Arena
		2	Nepal			0	
		1	Junkertown			0	
		81.93	Colosseo			81.94	
		2	Neon Junction			3	
		3	Aatlis			1	

=== Group C ===
Pos	Team	Pld	W	L	PCT	MW	ML	MD	Qualification
1	Germany	3	2	1	0.667	8	4	+4	Advance to knockout stage
2	Spain	3	2	1	0.667	7	3	+4	Advance to knockout stage
3	Canada	3	2	1	0.667	6	6	0	
4	Thailand	3	0	3	0.000	1	9	−8	

Source: Overwatch Esports

Match 1	August 20	Canada	3	–	2	Germany	Busan, South Korea
	4:05 am EDT	Recap					Busan Esports Arena
		1	Nepal			2	
		2	Paraíso			1	
		1	Route 66			3	
		3	New Junk City			2	
		109.23	Esperança			109.22	

Match 2	August 20	Thailand	0	–	3	Spain	Busan, South Korea
	6:40 am EDT	Recap					Busan Esports Arena
		1	Busan			2	
		0	New Junk City			3	
		2	Paraíso			3	

Match 3	August 22	Germany	3	–	1	Spain	Busan, South Korea
	12:05 am EDT	Recap					Busan Esports Arena
		2	Samoa			0	
		1	Neon Junction			0	
		1	New Junk City			3	
		1	Route 66			0	

Match 4	August 22	Canada	3	–	1	Thailand	Busan, South Korea
	1:35 am EDT	Recap					Busan Esports Arena
		2	Samoa			0	
		3	Neon Junction			4	
		2	Shambali Monastery			1	
		3	New Junk City			0	

Match 5	August 22	Canada	0	–	3	Spain	Busan, South Korea
	10:00 pm EDT	Recap					Busan Esports Arena
		1	Busan			2	
		1	Paraíso			2	
		1	New Junk City			3	

Match 6	August 23	Germany	3	–	0	Thailand	Busan, South Korea
	12:30 am EDT	Recap					Busan Esports Arena
		2	Nepal			0	
		3	Neon Junction			1	
		3	New Junk City			0	

=== Group D ===
Pos	Team	Pld	W	L	PCT	MW	ML	MD	Qualification
1	France	3	3	0	1.000	9	2	+7	Advance to knockout stage
2	South Korea	3	2	1	0.667	8	3	+5	Advance to knockout stage
3	Denmark	3	1	2	0.333	3	6	−3	
4	Colombia	3	0	3	0.000	0	9	−9	

Source: Overwatch Esports

Match 1	August 20	Denmark	3	–	0	Colombia	Busan, South Korea
	10:30 pm EDT	Recap					Busan Esports Arena
		2	Nepal			0	
		3	New Junk City			1	
		4	Neon Junction			3	

Match 2	August 21	France	3	–	2	South Korea	Busan, South Korea
	6:20 am EDT	Recap					Busan Esports Arena
		0	Nepal			2	
		0	Neon Junction			1	
		3	New Junk City			2	
		120.12	Esperança			75.34	
		1	Shambali Monastery			0	

Match 3	August 22	France	3	–	0	Denmark	Busan, South Korea
	3:30 am EDT	Recap					Busan Esports Arena
		2	Samoa			0	
		2	Eichenwalde			1	
		3	New Junk City			0	

Match 4	August 22	South Korea	3	–	0	Colombia	Busan, South Korea
	4:40 am EDT	Recap					Busan Esports Arena
		2	Nepal			0	
		3	New Junk City			0	
		1	Shambali Monastery			0	

Match 5	August 22	South Korea	3	–	0	Denmark	Busan, South Korea
	11:25 pm EDT	Recap					Busan Esports Arena
		2	Nepal			0	
		1	Neon Junction			0	
		142.41	Esperança			0	

Match 6	August 23	France	3	–	0	Colombia	Busan, South Korea
	1:40 am EDT	Recap					Busan Esports Arena
		2	Samoa			0	
		3	New Junk City			1	
		3	Neon Junction			1	

== Knockout stage ==
The knockout stage will be an eight-team single-elimination tournament held live in Anaheim, California.

=== Bracket ===
Quarterfinals
September 12
Saudi Arabia	3
Spain	1
September 12
Germany	0
Sweden	3
September 12
France	3
Australia	0
September 12
United States	0
South Korea	3

Semifinals
September 13
Saudi Arabia	3
Sweden	0
September 13
France	2
South Korea	3

Final
September 13
Saudi Arabia	1
South Korea	4
Third place
September 13
Sweden	1
France	3

=== Matches ===
Quarterfinals	September 12	Saudi Arabia	3	–	1	Spain	Anaheim, United States
	12:00 noon PDT						Anaheim Convention Center

Quarterfinals	September 12	Germany	0	–	3	Sweden	Anaheim, United States
	1:30 pm PDT						Anaheim Convention Center

Quarterfinals	September 12	France	3	–	0	Australia	Anaheim, United States
	3:00 pm PDT						Anaheim Convention Center

Quarterfinals	September 12	United States	0	–	3	South Korea	Anaheim, United States
	4:30 pm PDT						Anaheim Convention Center

Semifinals	September 13	Saudi Arabia	3	–	0	Sweden	Anaheim, United States
	9:15 am PDT						Anaheim Convention Center

Semifinals	September 13	France	2	–	3	South Korea	Anaheim, United States
	10:45 am PDT						Anaheim Convention Center

Third place	September 13	Sweden	1	–	3	France	Anaheim, United States
	1:15 pm PDT						Anaheim Convention Center

Final	September 13	Saudi Arabia	1	–	4	South Korea	Anaheim, United States
	2:45 pm PDT						Anaheim Convention Center

== Broadcast ==
The 2026 World Cup will be broadcast on Blizzard's official channels, with live coverage available in English, Japanese, and Korean. English-language coverage is streamed on Twitch and YouTube, Japanese coverage is streamed on Twitch, YouTube, and SOOP, and Korean coverage is streamed on Naver's CHZZK and SOOP.

== Entertainment ==
On August 22 and 23, coinciding with the group stage, Nexon held Overwatch Day, a large-scale fan event, at BEXCO in Busan, South Korea. The event was organized to commemorate the launch of the PC version of Overwatch through Nexon's platform in South Korea, which began on August 12. The event featured developer talks, creator matches, a cosplay contest, live art demonstrations, and interactive areas themed around the game's Busan map and MEKA unit. Members of the South Korean OWWC team also participated in a fan meeting and cheering event during the second day.

The World Cup finals at BlizzCon 2026 are also scheduled to feature several entertainment appearances. Rapper T-Pain was announced as a special guest for the Overwatch World Cup game, while Japanese musical duo Yoasobi is scheduled to perform during BlizzCon's first esports halftime show at the Overwatch World Cup Arena on September 13.

== Final standings ==
Place	Team	OQ	GS	QF	SF	Finals	Prize (%)	Prize (USD)
1st	South Korea	3–0	2–1	3–0	3–2	4–1		
2nd	Saudi Arabia	–	3–0	3–1	3–0	1–4		
3rd	France	3–0	3–0	3–0	2–3			
4th	Sweden	3–0	2–1	3–0	0–3			
5th–8th	Spain	2–1	2–1	1–3				
5th–8th	United States	3–0	3–0	0–3				
5th–8th	Australia	3–0	2–1	0–3				
5th–8th	Germany	3–0	2–1	0–3				
9th–16th	Canada	3–0	2–1					
9th–16th	China	–	1–2					
9th–16th	Denmark	2–1	1–2					
9th–16th	Great Britain	2–1	1–2					
9th–16th	Colombia	2–1	0–3					
9th–16th	Japan	2–1	0–3					
9th–16th	Mexico	2–1	0–3					
9th–16th	Thailand	2–1	0–3					
17th–30th	Austria	1–3						
17th–30th	Chile	1–3						
17th–30th	Hong Kong	1–3						
17th–30th	Norway	1–3						
17th–30th	Philippines	1–3						
17th–30th	Poland	1–3						
17th–30th	Puerto Rico	1–3						
17th–30th	Argentina	0–3						
17th–30th	Brazil	0–3						
17th–30th	Finland	0–3						
17th–30th	India	0–3						
17th–30th	Ireland	0–3						
17th–30th	Pakistan	0–3						
17th–30th	Portugal	0–3						
