= 2018 Overwatch League All-Star Game =

Esports

2018 OWL All-Star Game
| Atlantic Division | Pacific Division |
| 4 | 1 |
- Date: August 26, 2018
- Venue: Blizzard Arena, Burbank, California, US

Live Broadcast
- Broadcast(s): Disney XD; ESPN3; Twitch

The 2018 Overwatch League All-Star Game was the Overwatch League's (OWL) first edition of an all-star game that matched the top players in the Atlantic Division (ATL) against those in the Pacific Division (PAC). The game was played on August 26, 2018 at Blizzard Arena in Burbank, California and was the culmination of the league's All-Star Weekend. The Atlantic took the first All-Star title by defeating the Pacific by a score of 4–1. The game was televised by Disney XD and ESPN3 and streamed live on Twitch.

== All-Star Game ==
The All-Star Game was a five-map match between players from the Atlantic Division and Pacific Division using standard competitive settings. All 18 players on each team were required to have play-time, and substitutions were allowed between each map change.

=== Rosters and coaches ===
The rosters and coaches for the All-Star game were selected through a voting process. The starters were chosen by the fans, with voting beginning on June 1 and ending on June 17. Out of the two DPS, two tank, two support, and two flex players in each division with the highest cumulative vote, the top six players with the highest cumulative vote were named their division's All-Star starters. After the starting rosters were announced, an additional 12 players from each division were selected as reserves by Overwatch League players, coaches, casters, and staffers.

The All-Star Game starters were announced on June 22. In the Atlantic Division, four of the six starters were represented by New York Excelsior, and in the Pacific, two of the six starters were represented by Seoul Dynasty. The All-Star reserves were announced on July 10. London Spitfire had the most reserve players in the Atlantic Division, with four out of twelve of the spots, and Los Angeles Valiant lead the Pacific Division with five out of twelve reserve spots.

Atlantic Division All-Stars
| Handle | Name | Team |
Starters
| JJonak | Bang Seong-hyun | New York Excelsior |
| Saebyeolbe | Park Jong-ryeol | New York Excelsior |
| Pine | Kim Do-hyeon | New York Excelsior |
| Ark | Hong Yeon-jun | New York Excelsior |
| Carpe | Lee Jae-Hyeok | Philadelphia Fusion |
| Gesture | Hong Jae-Hui | London Spitfire |
Reserves
| Libero | Kim Hae-seong | New York Excelsior |
| Striker | Gwon Nam-ju | Boston Uprising |
| Sayaplayer | Ha Jeong-woo | Florida Mayhem |
| Bdosin | Choi Seung-tae | London Spitfire |
| Mano | Kim Dong-gyu | New York Excelsior |
| Meko | Kim Tae-hong | New York Excelsior |
| Muma | Austin Wilmot | Houston Outlaws |
| Gamsu | Noh Young-jin | Boston Uprising |
| Fury | Kim Jun-ho | London Spitfire |
| Poko | Gael Gouzerch | Philadelphia Fusion |
| Profit^{[a]} | Park Jun-young | London Spitfire |
Unable to Participate
| Birdring^{[b]} | Kim Ji-hyeok | London Spitfire |
| Neko | Park Se-hyun | Boston Uprising |
Head coach: Yoo “Pavane” Hyeon-sang (New York Excelsior)

Pacific Division All-Stars
| Handle | Name | Team |
Starters
| Fissure^{[e]} | Baek Chan-hyung | Seoul Dynasty |
| Custa | Scott Kennedy | Los Angeles Valiant |
| Geguri | Kim Se-yeon | Shanghai Dragons |
| Fleta | Kim Byung-sun | Seoul Dynasty |
| Ryujehong | Ryu Je-hong | Seoul Dynasty |
| Kariv^{[d]} | Park Young-Seo | Los Angeles Valiant |
Reserves
| Architect | Park Min-ho | San Francisco Shock |
| Soon | Terence Tarlier | Los Angeles Valiant |
| Agilities | Brady Girardi | Los Angeles Valiant |
| Surefour | Lane Roberts | Los Angeles Gladiators |
| BigGoose | Benjamin Isohanni | Los Angeles Gladiators |
| Sleepy | Nikola Andrews | San Francisco Shock |
| Fate | Koo Pan-Seung | Los Angeles Valiant |
| OGE | Son Min-seok | Dallas Fuel |
| Space | Indy Halpern | Los Angeles Valiant |
| Zunba | Kim Joon-Hyeok | Seoul Dynasty |
| Mickie | Pongphop Rattanasangchod | Dallas Fuel |
| Bischu^{[a]} | Aaron Kim | Los Angeles Gladiators |
Unable to Participate
| Seagull^{[c]} | Brandon Larned | Dallas Fuel |
Head coach: Moon “Moon” Byung-chul (Los Angeles Valiant)

^{a} Replacement Player selection due to injury or vacancy
^{b} Injured/suspended player; selected but did not participate
^{c} Retired player; selected but did not participate
^{d} Promoted to starter due to injury/vacancy
^{e} Traded to new team before All-Star Game

Source: Overwatch League

=== Game summary ===
| All-Star Game | August 26 | Atlantic Division | 4 | – | 1 | Pacific Division | Burbank, CA |
| | 11:00 am PST | Details | | | | | Blizzard Arena |
| | | 2 | King's Row | | | 3 | |
| | | 3 | Rialto | | | 2 | |
| | | 4 | Horizon Lunar Colony | | | 3 | |
| | | 2 | Ilios | | | 1 | |
| | | 3 | Route 66 | | | 2 | |

== All-Star Weekend ==
The season's All-Star Skill Matches took place on August 25, 2018.

=== Lúcioball Showdown ===
The Atlantic and Pacific teams competed in a 3v3 best-of-three series using standard Lúcioball settings on the Busan Lúcioball Arena map. Each match lasted five minutes; if a match was tied at the end of five minutes, then a sudden death overtime would begin, and the next goal would win.

Atlantic Division
| Handle | Name | Team |
|---|---|---|
| Ark | Hong Yeon-jun | New York Excelsior |
| Meko | Kim Tae-hong | New York Excelsior |
| Poko | Gael Gouzerch | Philadelphia Fusion |

Pacific Division
| Handle | Name | Team |
|---|---|---|
| Geguri | Kim Se-yeon | Shanghai Dragons |
| Fate | Koo Pan-Seung | Los Angeles Valiant |
| Fissure | Baek Chan-hyung | Seoul Dynasty |

| Lúcioball Showdown | August 25 | Atlantic Division | 2 | – | 1 | Pacific Division | Burbank, CA |
| | 4:00 pm PST | Details | | | | | Blizzard Arena |
| | | 3 | Busan Stadium | | | 2 | |
| | | 1 | Busan Stadium | | | 2 | |
| | | 4 | Busan Stadium | | | 3 | |

=== Mystery Heroes ===
The Atlantic and Pacific teams competed in a 6v6 Mystery Heroes game using standard competitive settings in a best-of-three series on control maps Nepal, Ilios, and Lijiang Tower. Players are assigned a random hero at the start of each map and a new random hero after each non-self-inflicted death.

Atlantic Division
| Handle | Name | Team |
|---|---|---|
| Libero | Kim Hae-seong | New York Excelsior |
| Mano | Kim Dong-gyu | New York Excelsior |
| Muma | Austin Wilmot | Houston Outlaws |
| Gesture | Hong Jae-Hui | London Spitfire |
| Fury | Kim Jun-ho | London Spitfire |
| Bdosin | Choi Seung-tae | London Spitfire |

Pacific Division
| Handle | Name | Team |
|---|---|---|
| Kariv | Park Young-Seo | Los Angeles Valiant |
| Ryujehong | Ryu Je-hong | Seoul Dynasty |
| Zunba | Kim Joon-Hyeok | Seoul Dynasty |
| Bischu | Aaron Kim | Los Angeles Gladiators |
| Custa | Scott Kennedy | Los Angeles Valiant |
| Space | Indy Halpern | Los Angeles Valiant |

| Mystery Heroes | August 25 | Atlantic Division | 2 | – | 1 | Pacific Division | Burbank, CA |
| | 5:00 pm PST | Details | | | | | Blizzard Arena |
| | | 1 | Nepal | | | 2 | |
| | | 2 | Ilios | | | 0 | |
| | | 2 | Lijang Tower | | | 0 | |

=== Widowmaker 1v1 ===
The coaches of the Atlantic and Pacific Divisions selected their four best Widowmaker players for this tournament. The four players competed head-to-head to determine one Atlantic and one Pacific champion, which played each other in the finals. Every match-up prior to the finals was first-to-seven eliminations, while the final was first-to-nine eliminations. Eliminations were head-shot only, and automatic firing was disabled. There were no capture points, but after 30 seconds, player locations were visible to both players. A match would result in a draw after five minutes. The matches were played on Castillo (quarterfinals), Necropolis (semifinals), and Ecopoint: Antartica (final).

Quarterfinals
Carpe | 7
Sayaplayer | 6
Atlantic Division
Striker | 7
Pine | 6
Soon | 7
Architect | 5
Pacific Division
Surefour | 7
Fleta | 5

Semifinals
Carpe | 7
Striker | 3
Soon | 6
Surefour | 7

Finals
Carpe | 6
Surefour | 9

=== Talent Takedown ===
Prior to All-Star Weekend, the Atlantic and Pacific coaches drafted two teams of casters and analysts. The two teams squared off in a 6v6 best-of-three series using standard competitive settings. The match started on Hybrid map King's Row, after which the team that lost the select the second map. If the series were to be tied 1-1, a game of Lúcioball would have been the tiebreaker. Overwatch League players helped call the game along with the casters and analysts not playing.

Atlantic Division
| Handle | Name |
|---|---|
| Malik | Malik Forte |
| Sideshow | Josh Wilkinson |
| Goldenboy | Alex Mendez |
| MrX | Matt Morello |
| DoA | Erik Lonnquist |
| Uber | Mitch Leslie |
| Bren | Brennon Hook |

Pacific Division
| Handle | Name |
|---|---|
| Reinforce | Jonathan Larsson |
| Crumbz | Alberto Rengifo |
| Soe | Soe Gschwind-Penski |
| Semmler | Auguste Massonnat |
| MonteCristo | Christopher Mykles |
| Puckett | Chris Puckett |
| Hex | Robert Kirkbride |

| Talent Takedown | August 25 | Atlantic Division | 0 | – | 2 | Pacific Division | Burbank, CA |
| | 5:30 pm PST | Details | | | | | Blizzard Arena |
| | | 4 | King's Row | | | 5 | |
| | | 2 | Watchpoint: Gibraltar | | | 3 | |

=== Lockout Elimination ===
The Atlantic and Pacific teams squared off in this 6v6 competition using standard lockout elimination settings. The winner was determined in a best-of-three series. The maps for this mode were Oasis University, Necropolis, and Castillo.

Atlantic Division
| Handle | Name | Team |
|---|---|---|
| Saebyeolbe | Park Jong-ryeol | New York Excelsior |
| Profit | Park Jun-young | London Spitfire |
| Gamsu | Noh Young-jin | Boston Uprising |
| Poko | Gael Gouzerch | Philadelphia Fusion |
| Ark | Hong Yeon-jun | New York Excelsior |
| JJonak | Bang Seong-hyun | New York Excelsior |

Pacific Division
| Handle | Name | Team |
|---|---|---|
| Sleepy | Nikola Andrews | San Francisco Shock |
| Agilities | Brady Girardi | Los Angeles Valiant |
| Kariv | Park Young-Seo | Los Angeles Valiant |
| BigGoose | Benjamin Isohanni | Los Angeles Gladiators |
| Mickie | Pongphop Rattanasangchod | Dallas Fuel |
| OGE | Son Min-seok | Dallas Fuel |

| Lockout Elimination | August 25 | Atlantic Division | 1 | – | 2 | Pacific Division | Burbank, CA |
| | 8:30 pm PST | Details | | | | | Blizzard Arena |
| | | 1 | Oasis University | | | 3 | |
| | | 3 | Necropolis | | | 2 | |
| | | 2 | Castillo | | | 3 | |

== Charity cheer ==
During the All-Star Weekend, 100% of all "Cheers", a special form of emoticon purchased as a microtransaction, on Twitch while watching any of the Overwatch League channels were donated to Child's Play, a charitable organization that donates toys and games to children's hospitals worldwide. At the conclusion of the weekend, viewers raised $34,304.37 for the charity.

== Broadcasting ==
The entire All-Star Weekend was televised nationally by ESPN3 and Disney XD and live-streamed on Twitch, the Overwatch League website, and Major League Gaming.
