= Fleta (gamer) =

South Korean professional Overwatch player

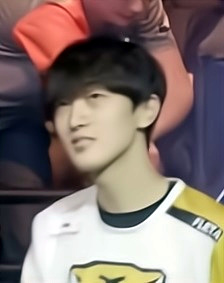
- Kim in 2019

Personal information
- Name: 김병선 (Kim Byung-sun)
- Born: September 2, 1999 (age 27)
- Nationality: South Korean

Current team
- Team: YETI
- Role: Coach
- Game: Overwatch
- League: Overwatch Champions Series

Career information
- Playing career: 2017–2023
- Role: Damage, Tank
- Coaching career: 2023–present

Team history

As player:
- 2017: Flash Lux
- 2017: Lunatic-Hai
- 2018–2019: Seoul Dynasty
- 2020–2023: Shanghai Dragons

As coach:
- 2023: Shanghai Dragons
- 2024: YETI

Career highlights and awards
- OWL champion (2021); OWL Most Valuable Player (2020); OWL Role Star (2020); 3× OWL All-Star (2018, 2019, 2020); OWWC champion (2018)

Kim Byung-sun (Korean: 김병선, born September 2, 1999), better known by his online alias Fleta, is a South Korean Overwatch coach and former professional player. He began his esports career with Flash Lux and had a brief stint playing for Lunatic-Hai. Kim signed with the Seoul Dynasty of the Overwatch League (OWL) in its inaugural season. After two years with the Dynasty, he signed with the Shanghai Dragons. In the middle of the 2023, Kim transitioned to a coaching role.

Kim is known for his extreme flexibility to play as nearly any hero at a high level. Since the inception of the OWL, Kim has been selected to play in every All-Star Game, was awarded with a Role Star commendation in 2020, was named the 2020 Overwatch League Most Valuable Player, and won the 2021 Grand Finals with the Dragons. Outside of the OWL, Kim won OGN Seoul Cup with Lunatic-Hai and won the 2018 Overwatch World Cup as a member of South Korea.

== Early years ==
Kim was born on September 2, 1999.

== Professional career ==
=== Early career ===
Kim played for South Korean team Flash Lux in OGN Overwatch APEX seasons two through four. In his nine months with the team, Kim claimed over 50% of his team's final blows, a statistic referring to when a player lands the final shot that kills an opponent; however, Flash Lux did not win a single match the group stage in of any of the tournaments, going 0–9 overall.

Kim signed with South Korean team Lunatic-Hai in October 2017. After playing five days with the team, Kim team won the OGN Seoul Cup with the team after defeating teams Miraculous Youngster and Cloud 9 KongDoo in the tournament.

=== Seoul Dynasty ===
Days after winning the Seoul Cup, Kim was signed to the Seoul-based team, later revealed as the Seoul Dynasty, in Blizzard Entertainment's upcoming Overwatch League. In the beginning of the 2018 season, Kim performed well enough to put himself in the conversation for the league's most valuable player, but he struggled to maintain his consistency in the later half. Despite Seoul not making any stage playoffs or season playoffs in 2018, Kim was named as a starter for the 2018 All-Star Game.

Through the first three stages of the 2019 season, the team composition that was most prevalent in the league was three tanks and three supports. With damage characters not as viable, Kim spent over 85% of his playing time as the tank Zarya or support Brigitte, although he was often benched. In Stage 4, the league implemented an enforced 2-2-2 role lock, where teams were required to run a team composition of two damage, two tank, and two support characters. Kim saw more playing time going forward, mainly playing as Mei. Seoul's season ended in the first round of the lower bracket of the season playoffs, as they fell to the Hangzhou Spark, 1–4. Kim was selected as a starter for the 2019 All-Star Game.

=== Shanghai Dragons ===
In November 2019, Kim was transferred to the Shanghai Dragons. In the 2020 season, Kim he won his first OWL midseason tournament title, defeating his former team Seoul Dynasty the Asia-Pacific (APAC) May Melee finals, 4–3, on May 24, 2020. He and the team reached the finals in the second tournament of the season, the APAC Summer Showdown, although they lost the finals match to the Guangzhou Charge. In the APAC Countdown Cup finals, Kim played on a multitude of different characters as the Dragons went on to defeat the Hangzhou Spark to claim their second midseason tournament title. At the end of the regular season, Kim had the third best eliminations per minute (2.01), fifth most in final blows (1084), fifth best final blow-to-death ratio (2) and fifth most eliminations (2529), and helped the team finish the regular season with a league-best 27–2 record and advance to the Grand Finals bracket of the 2020 Overwatch League playoffs. However, a loss to the Seoul Dynasty in the lower bracket finals ended their playoff run. Kim received numerous accolades for his performance in the 2020 season. He was named a 2020 All-Star, marking the third consecutive season he had received the honor, named a Role Star, a roster voted on by OWL general managers, coaches, broadcast talent, and the media, and was named the 2020 Overwatch League Most Valuable Player.

On March 23, 2021, Blizzard released commemorative, in-game skin for Echo, in honor of his MVP award. The skin was the last MVP inspired skin made, after the league decided to discontinue making them based on individual players.

Kim picked up two more midseason tournament titles in the 2021 season, defeating the Dallas Fuel, 4–3, in the June Joust finals and the Chengdu Hunters, 4–1, in the Summer Showdown finals; he was named the Player of the Match in the Summer Showdown finals. He was a candidate for the league's MVP award in the 2021 season, and on September 26, 2021, Kim won his first OWL Grand Finals title, after the Dragons defeated the Atlanta Reign, 4–0, in the 2021 Grand Finals.

The Dragons announced, in March 2023, that Kim would be switching from the damage role to the tank role for the 2023 season. On June 27, the Dragons announced that he would retire as a player and become one of their assistant coaches.

== National team career ==
Kim was selected to participate in the 2018 Overwatch World Cup as a member of Team South Korea. The team did not lose a single series and defeated Team China in the finals at BlizzCon in Anaheim, California.

== Player profile ==
Kim primarily played damage heroes. Early in his career, he established a reputation of performing at a high level while on otherwise underperforming teams. In a match when he was playing with Flash Lux, Kim secured over half of his team's final blows in one of the maps; this led to an official OWL statistic being created called the "Fleta Deadlift" – officially defined as when a player "accounts for 50 percent or more of their team's final blows in a map." Despite statistic being named after him, Kim had only secured one Fleta Deadlift in the OWL as of July 16, 2021. Able to play a wide variety of different characters, he also established himself as an extremely flexible player, leading to the phrase "Fleta is the Meta" to become popular among Seoul Dynasty fans in the 2018 season. The phrase and statistic were incorporated into an event at the 2020 All-Star Weekend; the "Who is Meta?" competition, a play off of "Fleta is Meta", was an event in which the player with the highest Fleta Deadlift percentage won the game.

Awards and achievements
Preceded by Jay "sinatraa" Won	Overwatch League MVP; 2020	Succeeded by Xin "Leave" Huang
