= 2016 Overwatch World Cup =

Esports tournament

Tournament information
- Game: Overwatch
- Location: Anaheim, California, United States
- Dates: October 29–November 5
- Administrator: Blizzard Entertainment
- Tournament format(s): Round-robin and Knockout
- Venue: Anaheim Convention Center
- Teams: 16

Final positions
- Champions: South Korea
- 1st runner-up: Russia
- 2nd runner-up: Sweden
- MVP: (South Korea) Gong "Miro" Jin-hyuk

The 2016 Overwatch World Cup was the inaugural Overwatch World Cup, an annual Overwatch esports tournament, organized by Blizzard Entertainment, the game's developer. It was the first of the series, and the final tournament took place at BlizzCon at the Anaheim Convention Center from November 4–5, 2016.

The final took place on November 5 between South Korea and Russia. South Korea won 4–0 to win the first World Cup title.

== Teams ==
=== Players ===
Blizzard selected the top players from Season One of competitive play of Overwatch to possibly represent their country as a team member. Players with an Overwatch account and a region-specified Battle.net account then voted on who they would like to see on their respective country's roster. Over 3 million votes to decide national teams were cast.

=== Qualification ===
Throughout September 2016, fifty national teams entered to qualify for the Overwatch World Cup through best-of-three online qualifiers. Six teams automatically qualified for the group stages. In total, four teams from the Americas, six from Europe, and six from the Asia-Pacific qualified for the group stages of the World Cup.

Invitation (6)

- Australasia
- Brazil
- Canada
- China
- South Korea
- United States

American Qualifier (1)

- Chile

Asia-Pacific (3)

- Chinese Taipei
- Thailand
- Singapore

European Qualifier (6)

- Germany
- Finland
- France
- Sweden
- Russia
- Spain

Automatically qualified Qualified Did not qualify Did not participate

== Group stage ==
The qualified teams were grouped into four different round-robin style groups, with the matches to be played in online. The top two teams in each group advanced to the knockout stage.

=== Group A ===
Pos	Team	W	L	MW	ML	MD	Qualification
1	Spain	3	0	6	2	+4	Advance to knockout stage
2	Sweden	2	1	5	2	+3	Advance to knockout stage
3	Canada	1	2	3	4	−1	
4	Brazil	0	3	0	6	−6	

=== Group B ===
Pos	Team	W	L	MW	ML	MD	Qualification
1	Russia	3	0	6	1	+5	Advance to knockout stage
2	United States	2	1	5	2	+3	Advance to knockout stage
3	Germany	1	2	2	4	−2	
4	Chile	0	3	0	6	−6	

=== Group C ===
Pos	Team	W	L	MW	ML	MD	Qualification
1	South Korea	3	0	6	0	+6	Advance to knockout stage
2	Finland	2	1	4	3	+1	Advance to knockout stage
3	Australia	1	2	2	4	−2	
4	Chinese Taipei	0	3	1	6	−5	

=== Group D ===
Pos	Team	W	L	MW	ML	MD	Qualification
1	France	2	1	5	3	+2	Advance to tiebreakers
1	China	2	1	5	3	+2	Advance to tiebreakers
1	Thailand	2	1	5	3	+2	Advance to tiebreakers
4	Singapore	0	3	0	6	−6	

=== Tiebreakers ===
Pos	Team	W	L	MW	ML	MD	Qualification
1	China	2	0	2	0	+2	Advance to knockout stage
2	France	1	1	1	1	0	Advance to knockout stage
3	Thailand	0	2	0	2	−2	

== Knockout stage ==
=== Bracket ===
Quarterfinals
South Korea	2
United States	0
China	0
Sweden	2
Russia	2
France	1
Spain	1
Finland	2

Semifinals
South Korea	2
Sweden	0
Russia	2
Finland	0

Finals
South Korea	4
Russia	0
Third place
Sweden	2
Finland	1
