= JJonak =

South Korean professional esports player

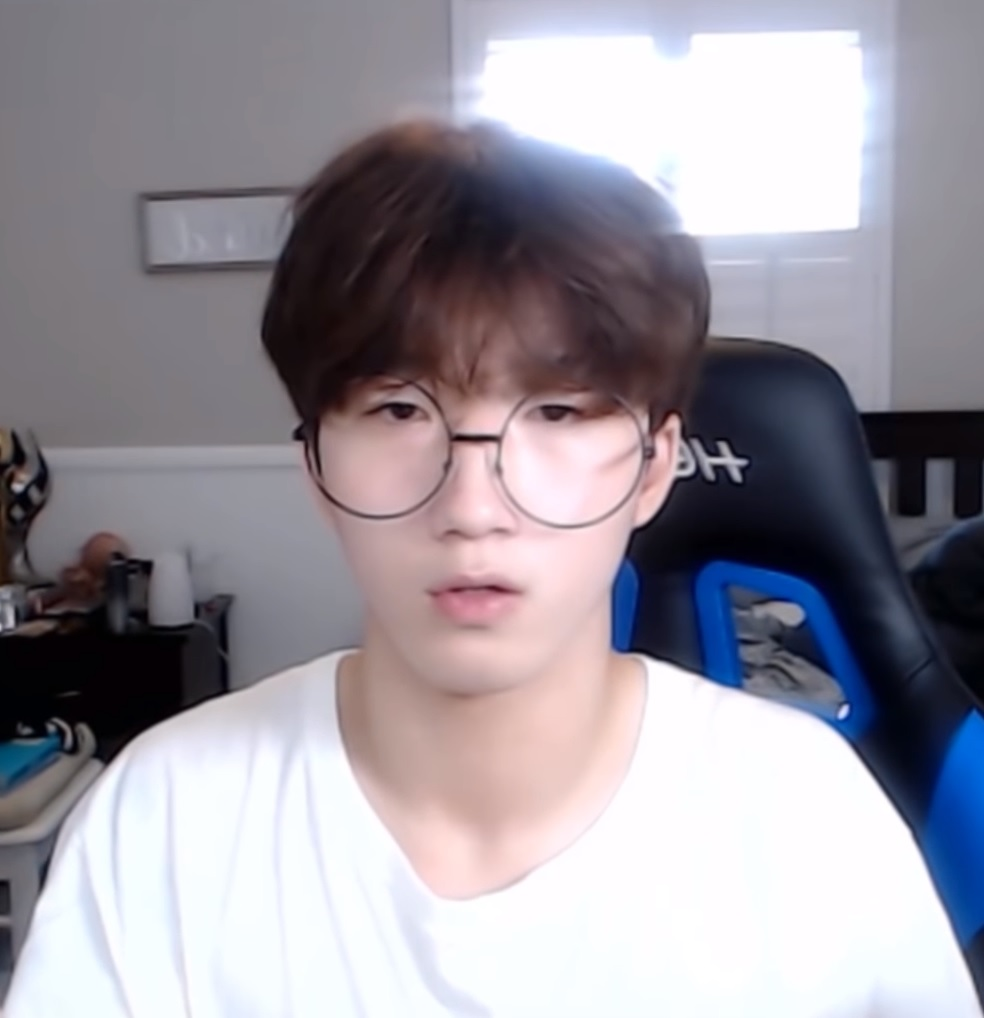

Personal information
- Name: Bang Sung-hyeon
- Born: 1999 or 2000 (age 26–27)
- Nationality: Korean

Career information
- Game: Overwatch
- Playing career: 2017–2022
- Role: Support
- Number: 44

Team history
- 2017: LW Blue
- 2018–2021: New York Excelsior
- 2022 (Note: Signed during the offseason only.): Seoul Dynasty

Career highlights and awards
- OWL Most Valuable Player (2018); 2× OWL Stage champion (2018); 3× OWL All-Star (2018, 2019, 2020); OWWC Most Valuable Player (2018); OWWC champion (2018)

Bang Sung-hyeon (Korean: 방성현), better known by his online alias JJonak (JO-nak), is a South Korean professional esports player, best known as a competitive Overwatch player. Bang signed with the New York Excelsior (NYXL) for the inaugural season of the Overwatch League. In his time with NYXL, Bang won two stage titles and was named the league's regular season most valuable player in 2018. Following the 2021 season, Bang left the NYXL and signed with the Seoul Dynasty. Prior to the beginning of the 2022 season, he left the Dynasty due to health issues. Bang's skill in Overwatch led to the developers to make a special and unique skin for him.

== Early life ==
Bang "JJonak" Sung-hyeon was raised in Seoul, South Korea. He recalled having a good relationship with his parents and wanting to pursue a professional gaming career from a young age. He pursued first-person shooter and fighting video games rather than schoolwork. While in high school, Bang discovered Overwatch, the game which he would later play professionally, at a PC Bang. Bang's in-game name is based on the Korean phrase "쪼물락낙지" (jjomullak nakji), which translates to "fumbling octopus". He modeled himself on professional Overwatch player Ryu "Ryujehong" Je-hong, by studying his playstyle, game settings, and choice of computing peripherals.

== Career ==
External videos
- JJonak's New York Excelsior introduction

=== New York Excelsior ===
Bang professionally debuted with New York Excelsior in January 2018. (Note: Bang had previously signed with LW Blue in 2017, but in preparation to join the Overwatch League, where the team would compose most of New York Excelsior's roster, LW Blue did not compete professionally. He also could not compete in the league's pre-season due to its minimum age cutoff.) Bang and the Excelsior found massive success in the 2018 regular season, and Bang quickly became known for his skill with the hero Zenyatta, a hero in the support role who Bang adopted a unique, very aggressive playstyle for often dealing as much damage on the hero as enemy damage players. In Stage 1 of the season, the team amassed a 9–1 record; Kotaku described Bang's play in that time as the most valuable on the top-ranked team, with his Zenyatta skill having surpassed that of his role model Ryujehong. The team continued their success in Stage 2, earning a 9–1 record and the Stage 2 title after defeating the Philadelphia Fusion on March 25 in the Stage 2 Finals. Through this point of the season, Bang, playing as Zenyatta, had the highest player rating among all Overwatch League players for any individual character. Bang won his second stage title with the team in Stage 3 after they defeated the Boston Uprising in the Stage 3 Finals on May 6. New York ended their season with a league-leading 34–6 record. In the 2018 playoffs, the team had a first-round bye and faced the Philadelphia Fusion in the semifinals on July 18 and 21. New York lost both matchups by scores of 0–3 and 2–3, eliminating them from the playoffs.

Bang received several commendations for his performance in the 2018 regular season. He was selected as a starter in the All-Star game. Additionally, he was named the most valuable player of the league's first season by an extremely large margin, earning twice as many votes as the next closest player, Chan-Hyung "Fissure" Baek of the Los Angeles Gladiators. For this, Blizzard created a special cosmetic skin for Zenyatta inspired by Bang's background, which was made available for players to purchase during the 2019 Overwatch League season.

Bang and New York had somewhat successful 2019 regular season, posting perfect 7–0 records in both Stage 1 and Stage 3; the team finished the regular season with a 22–6 record. In the 2019 playoffs, the team defeated the London Spitfire and Atlanta Reign in the first two rounds, with Bang primarily playing as the character Moira. Bang said that this choice was due to his usual characters, Ana and Zenyatta, being ineffective given the current team composition meta of the league. However, a 3–4 loss to the Vancouver Titans dropped New York to the lower bracket of the tournament, where they were defeated by the San Francisco Shock, 0–4, ending their playoff run.

For his performance in the regular season, Bang was selected as a starter for the 2019 All-Star Game for the second consecutive year.

Following the 2020 season, the NYXL released all of their players except for Bang, who the team re-signed. The team finished the 2021 regular season with a 7–9 record. Following the 2021 season, Bang parted ways with the Excelsior.

=== Seoul Dynasty ===
In October 2021, Bang signed with the Seoul Dynasty. However, he left the team in February 2022 — two months before the beginning of the 2022 season. Citing continuous health issues, Bang announced that he would be "tak[ing] a break" from competitive Overwatch.

== National team career ==
Bang competed for Team South Korea in the 2018 Overwatch World Cup. The team placed #1 seed in their qualifier round, winning every game. They competed against Russia, Finland, Japan, Hong Kong, and Chinese Taipei. They played in the finals at BlizzCon in Los Angeles against Australia, the United Kingdom and China, winning all matches and being crowned the Overwatch world cup champions for a third consecutive year. Bang also won the most valuable player award for this tournament.

== Playstyle ==
While Zenyatta traditionally plays a support role on Overwatch teams, primarily healing and boosting allies and secondarily dealing damage, Bang is known for using the character's high damage output. Zenyatta's two main abilities are orbs of harmony and discord, which can be assigned to other players to heal teammates and increase a damage multiplier on enemies, respectively. Bang's skill with Zenyatta descends from his ability to predict enemy movements, aim with precision, and take risky moves, which altogether let him make long-distance sniper and trick shots better expected of players in damage-focused rather than support roles. For this reason, he often sidelines his team healing duties to prioritize damage. Support roles, such as those filled by Zenyatta, traditionally accompany a high-damage role as a bodyguard, but with Bang's high-damage play, the New York Excelsior's other support player often would escort and boost Bang. This nontraditional strategy contributed to the New York Excelsior's standout debut standings and the two support players' receiving the highest season rankings. Bang's Zenyatta playstyle was inimitable by other teams in the league's first season.

== Notes ==
Awards and achievements
Preceded by Incumbent	Overwatch League MVP; 2018	Succeeded by Jay "sinatraa" Won
Preceded by Félix "xQc" Lengyel	Overwatch World Cup MVP; 2018	Succeeded by Jay "sinatraa" Won
