= 2023 Overwatch World Cup =

Esports tournament

Tournament information
- Game: Overwatch 2
- Date: October 29 – November 4, 2023
- Administrator: Blizzard Entertainment
- Tournament format(s): Round-robin and Knockout
- Venue(s): Anaheim Convention Center; Anaheim, California
- Teams: 16

Final positions
- Champions: Saudi Arabia
- 1st runner-up: China
- 2nd runner-up: Finland

The 2023 Overwatch World Cup (OWWC) was the fifth edition of the Overwatch World Cup, an Overwatch esports tournament, organized by the game's developer Blizzard Entertainment. Over 40 teams from various countries and regions competed for one of the 16 spots in the 2023 OWWC. The group stage was a no audience LAN event and took place from October 29 to November 1. The knockout stage took place at the Anaheim Convention Center in Anaheim, California, during BlizzCon from November 3 to 4, 2023. It was the first World Cup event since 2019 and the first of Overwatch 2.

The finals took place on November 4 between Saudi Arabia and China. Saudi Arabia won the match by a score of 3–2 to claim their first World Cup title.

== Teams ==
=== Committees and players ===
Each country has a National Competition Committee, consisting of a general manager, head coach, and social lead, who are responsible for organizing tryouts for their country. Blizzard chose committees via an application process, which began in February 2023. Throughout three weekends in February, every committee hosted an open format tournament, called World Cup Trials. The winning team of each World Cup Trial won US$2,000 and earned an automatic invitation to their country's team tryouts in March 2023. Committees finalized a seven-person roster by April 2023.

=== Qualification ===
Automatically qualified Qualified Did not qualify Did not participate

A total of 36 countries and regions were invited, based on Overwatch 2 player population data, to play in online qualifiers for the 2023 OWWC, with the teams evenly divided into six regions. An additional four teams also played in the online qualifiers via a "wild card challenge". Of the teams, a total of 15 advanced to the group stage of the OWWC. China received a direct invitation to the group stage due to "the current dynamics in China".

Automatically qualified (1)

- China

Americas (5)

- Brazil
- Canada
- Colombia
- Mexico
- United States

Europe and Middle East (5)

- Finland
- France
- Great Britain
- Saudi Arabia
- Spain

Asia-Pacific (5)

- Australia
- Hong Kong
- Japan
- South Korea
- Thailand

== Venue ==
2023 Overwatch World Cup is located in California
Anaheim, California, USA
Anaheim Convention Center Arena
Capacity: 7,500

== Online qualifiers ==
=== Americas ===
Group A

Pos	Team	Pld	W	L	PCT	MW	ML	MD	Qualification
1	United States	5	5	0	1.000	10	1	+9	Advance to group stage
2	Canada	5	4	1	0.800	8	2	+6	Advance to group stage
3	Mexico	5	3	2	0.600	7	5	+2	Advance to group stage
4	Puerto Rico	5	2	3	0.400	5	6	−1	
5	Costa Rica	5	1	4	0.200	2	8	−6	
6	Guatemala	5	0	5	0.000	0	10	−10	

Source: Overwatch World Cup

Group B

Pos	Team	Pld	W	L	PCT	MW	ML	MD	Qualification
1	Colombia	5	5	0	1.000	10	1	+9	Advance to group stage
2	Brazil	5	4	1	0.800	8	2	+6	Advance to group stage
3	Chile	5	3	2	0.600	7	5	+2	
4	Peru	5	2	3	0.400	4	7	−3	
5	Argentina	5	1	4	0.200	4	8	−4	
6	Ecuador	5	0	5	0.000	0	10	−10	

Source: Overwatch World Cup

=== Europe and Middle East ===
Group A

Pos	Team	Pld	W	L	PCT	MW	ML	MD	Qualification
1	Great Britain	7	6	1	0.857	13	3	+10	Advance to group stage
2	Spain	7	5	2	0.714	11	7	+4	Advance to group stage
3	France	7	5	2	0.714	11	5	+6	Advance to group stage
4	Denmark	7	4	3	0.571	10	8	+2	
5	Belgium	7	3	4	0.429	6	8	−2	
6	Netherlands	7	3	4	0.429	8	8	0	
7	Italy	7	2	5	0.286	5	11	−6	
8	Portugal	7	0	7	0.000	0	14	−14	

Source: Overwatch World Cup

Group B

Pos	Team	Pld	W	L	PCT	MW	ML	MD	Qualification
1	Saudi Arabia	7	7	0	1.000	14	1	+13	Advance to group stage
2	Finland	7	6	1	0.857	13	2	+11	Advance to group stage
3	Norway	7	5	2	0.714	10	6	+4	
4	Sweden	7	3	4	0.429	7	8	−1	
5	Germany	7	3	4	0.429	6	7	−1	
6	Turkey	7	2	5	0.286	6	11	−5	
7	Poland	7	1	6	0.143	4	13	−9	
8	Iceland	7	1	6	0.143	3	13	−10	

Source: Overwatch World Cup

=== Asia-Pacific ===
Group A

Pos	Team	Pld	W	L	PCT	MW	ML	MD	Qualification
1	South Korea	5	5	0	1.000	10	0	+10	Advance to group stage
2	Japan	5	4	1	0.800	8	2	+6	Advance to group stage
3	Hong Kong	5	3	2	0.600	6	4	+2	Advance to group stage
4	Chinese Taipei	5	2	3	0.400	4	6	−2	
5	Indonesia	5	1	4	0.200	2	8	−6	
6	Philippines	5	0	5	0.000	0	10	−10	

Source: Overwatch World Cup

Group B

Pos	Team	Pld	W	L	PCT	MW	ML	MD	Qualification
1	Australia	5	5	0	1.000	10	1	+9	Advance to group stage
2	Thailand	5	4	1	0.800	9	3	+6	Advance to group stage
3	India	5	3	2	0.600	7	5	+2	
4	New Zealand	5	2	3	0.400	4	6	−2	
5	Malaysia	5	1	4	0.200	2	9	−7	
6	Singapore	5	0	5	0.000	2	10	−8	

Source: Overwatch World Cup

== Group stage ==
The group stage ran from October 29 to November 1, 2023, and was a LAN event in Southern California without an audience. A total of 16 teams, determined from the online qualifiers, were divided into groups, and each group competed in a round-robin tournament. Of the 16 teams, eight advanced to the knockouts.

Group A

Pos	Team	Pld	W	L	PCT	MW	ML	MD	Qualification
1	South Korea	3	3	0	1.000	6	1	+5	Advance to knockout stage
2	Finland	3	2	1	0.667	5	2	+3	Advance to knockout stage
3	Colombia	3	1	2	0.333	2	5	−3	
4	Mexico	3	0	3	0.000	1	6	−5	

Source: Overwatch World Cup

Group B

Pos	Team	Pld	W	L	PCT	MW	ML	MD	Qualification
1	Great Britain	3	3	0	1.000	6	0	+6	Advance to knockout stage
2	Canada	3	2	1	0.667	4	2	+2	Advance to knockout stage
3	Australia	3	1	2	0.333	2	4	−2	
4	Brazil	3	0	3	0.000	0	6	−6	

Source: Overwatch World Cup

Group C

Pos	Team	Pld	W	L	PCT	MW	ML	MD	Qualification
1	China	3	3	0	1.000	6	0	+6	Advance to knockout stage
2	Spain	3	2	1	0.667	4	2	+2	Advance to knockout stage
3	Thailand	3	1	2	0.333	2	4	−2	
4	Hong Kong	3	0	3	0.000	0	6	−6	

Source: Overwatch World Cup

Group D

Pos	Team	Pld	W	L	PCT	MW	ML	MD	Qualification
1	Saudi Arabia	3	3	0	1.000	6	0	+6	Advance to knockout stage
2	United States	3	2	1	0.667	4	3	+1	Advance to knockout stage
3	Japan	3	1	2	0.333	2	4	−2	
4	France	3	0	3	0.000	1	6	−5	

Source: Overwatch World Cup

== Knockout stage ==
The knockout stage took place from November 3–4, 2023, at the Anaheim Convention Center in Anaheim, California, during BlizzCon. The top eight teams from the group stage competed in a single-elimination tournament.

=== Bracket ===
Quarterfinals
November 3
A1	South Korea	3
B2	Canada	1
November 3
C1	China	3
D2	United States	0
November 3
B1	Great Britain	0
A2	Finland	3
November 3
D1	Saudi Arabia	3
C2	Spain	0

Semifinals
November 4
A1	South Korea	2
C1	China	3
November 4
A2	Finland	2
D1	Saudi Arabia	3

Final
November 4
C1	China	2
D1	Saudi Arabia	3
Third place
November 4
A1	South Korea	2
A2	Finland	3

== Prize pool ==
The 2023 World Cup prize pool was generated through crowdfunding via the sales of in-game cosmetics within Overwatch 2. A total of 25% of the revenue generated from Overwatch World Cup cosmetics and bundled packages contributed to the overall prize pool of the Overwatch World Cup. There was no preset limit or cap on these contributions, so the prize pool could grow until the end of the crowdfunding initiative, which took place on the final day of the Overwatch World Cup Finals. On the first day of BlizzCon, Blizzard announced that the prize pool had reached at least US$500,000. A segment of the prize pool was allocated to the all competing teams in the tournament. The specific distribution percentages was determined based on each team's placement in the tournament. The top 16 teams that qualified for the LAN event were awarded 73% of the total prize pool, while the remaining 27% was equitably divided among the teams that participated in the Online Qualifiers and the Wild Card Challenge. The prize pool distribution is detailed below.

Place	Team	Prize ($)	Prize (%)
1	Saudi Arabia	>$125,000	25%
2	China	>$50,000	10%
3	Finland	>$40,000	8%
4	South Korea	>$30,000	6%
5–8	Canada	>$15,000	3%
5–8	Great Britain	>$15,000	3%
5–8	Spain	>$15,000	3%
5–8	United States	>$15,000	3%
9–16	Australia	>$7,500	1.5%
9–16	Brazil	>$7,500	1.5%
9–16	Colombia	>$7,500	1.5%
9–16	France	>$7,500	1.5%
9–16	Hong Kong	>$7,500	1.5%
9–16	Japan	>$7,500	1.5%
9–16	Mexico	>$7,500	1.5%
9–16	Thailand	>$7,500	1.5%
17–43	–	>$5,000	1%
