= 2019 Overwatch World Cup =

Esports tournament

Tournament information
- Game: Overwatch
- Date: November 1–2
- Administrator: Blizzard Entertainment
- Tournament format(s): Round-robin and Knockout
- Venue(s): Anaheim Convention Center; Anaheim, California
- Teams: 10

Final positions
- Champions: United States
- 1st runner-up: China
- 2nd runner-up: South Korea
- MVP: (United States) Jay "sinatraa" Won

The 2019 Overwatch World Cup was the fourth edition of the Overwatch World Cup, an Overwatch esports tournament, organized by the game's developer Blizzard Entertainment and took place at the Anaheim Convention Center during BlizzCon from November 1–2, 2019. After qualifications, ten team competed in the group stages, with six team advancing to the knockout round.

The final took place on November 2 between the United States and China. The United States won the match 3–0 to claim their first World Cup title, marking the first time that the title was won by a team other than South Korea.

== Teams ==
=== Committees ===
Each country has a National Competition Committee, consisting of a general manager, head coach, and community lead. The entire committee will be selected by fans through a two-step voting process. The first phase took place from May 15 to May 24, where any individuals was able to share a custom link for fans to vote for them. From May 30 to June 9, the top candidates from the first phase entered a runoff for their respective country. Any person with an active Battle.net account was able to vote for who they wanted see as their country's general manager and community lead, and Overwatch players with a high enough skill rating on the competitive ladder were allowed to vote for the head coach position.

=== Players ===
The players representing each country were selected by their National Competition Committee; player tryouts were held from July 13 to July 14. The Committees selected up to 12 players to represent their country and then had to cut it down to 7 players for their final roster.

=== Qualification ===
Any country wishing to participate is eligible to play in the preliminary rounds, a single-elimination, seeded bracket. The top five countries based on their national ranking will not have to play in the preliminary rounds and will have any automatic bye to the group stages. A country's national ranking will be determined by a point-ranking system based on final placements in the previous World Cups; the seeding will be based on the national rankings. The top five countries from the preliminary rounds will move on to the group stages.

The single-elimination preliminary rounds for qualification took place on October 31. Twenty-eight teams competed in the preliminary rounds.

Automatically qualified (5)

- Canada
- China
- France
- South Korea
- United States

Qualified (5)

- United Kingdom
- Denmark
- Netherlands
- Russia
- Sweden

Automatically qualified Qualified Did not qualify Did not participate

== Venue ==
2019 Overwatch World Cup is located in California
Anaheim, California, USA
Anaheim Convention Center Arena
Capacity: 7,500

== Group stage ==
The Group stages took place on November 1. The ten countries competing in the group stages were split evenly into two round-robin style groups. The top country from each group moved on to the semifinals, while the second- and third-placed countries in each group moved on to the quarterfinals.

=== Group A ===
Pos	Team	W	L	MW	ML	MD	Qualification
1	United States	4	0	12	0	+12	Advance to knockout stage semifinals
2	France	3	1	6	6	±0	Advance to knockout stage quarterfinals
3	South Korea	2	2	7	5	+2	Advance to knockout stage quarterfinals
4	Sweden	1	3	3	9	−6	
5	United Kingdom	0	4	2	10	−8	

Source: OWWC

Round 1	November 1	South Korea	3	–	0	United Kingdom	Anaheim, CA
	12:00 noon PST						Anaheim Convention Center
		2	Ilios			1	
		3	Numbani			0	
		3	Havana			2	

Round 1	November 1	France	0	–	3	United States	Anaheim, CA
	12:00 noon PST						Anaheim Convention Center
		0	Ilios			2	
		0	Numbani			3	
		1	Havana			3	

Round 2	November 1	United States	3	–	0	Sweden	Anaheim, CA
	1:15 pm PST						Anaheim Convention Center
		2	Oasis			0	
		3	Blizzard World			0	
		3	Route 66			1	

Round 2	November 1	South Korea	1	–	2	France	Anaheim, CA
	1:15 pm PST						Anaheim Convention Center
		2	Lijiang Tower			1	
		2	Eichenwalde			3	
		1	Rialto			2	

Round 3	November 1	France	2	–	1	United Kingdom	Anaheim, CA
	2:30 pm PST						Anaheim Convention Center
		0	Busan			2	
		3	King's Row			1	
		2	Watchpoint: Gibraltar			1	

Round 3	November 1	South Korea	3	–	0	Sweden	Anaheim, CA
	2:30 pm PST						Anaheim Convention Center
		2	Busan			0	
		3	King's Row			2	
		3	Watchpoint: Gibraltar			0	

Round 4	November 1	France	2	–	1	Sweden	Anaheim, CA
	3:45 pm PST						Anaheim Convention Center
		1	Lijiang Tower			2	
		3	Eichenwalde			1	
		4	Rialto			3	

Round 4	November 1	United States	3	–	0	United Kingdom	Anaheim, CA
	3:45 pm PST						Anaheim Convention Center
		2	Lijiang Tower			1	
		2	Eichenwalde			1	
		3	Rialto			0	

Round 5	November 1	South Korea	0	–	3	United States	Anaheim, CA
	5:00 pm PST						Anaheim Convention Center
		0	Nepal			2	
		3	Hollywood			4	
		1	Junkertown			2	

Round 5	November 1	United Kingdom	1	–	2	Sweden	Anaheim, CA
	5:00 pm PST						Anaheim Convention Center
		1	Nepal			2	
		1	Hollywood			3	
		4	Junkertown			3	

=== Group B ===
Pos	Team	W	L	MW	ML	MD	Qualification
1	China	4	0	11	1	+10	Advance to knockout stage semifinals
2	Denmark	3	1	7	5	+2	Advance to knockout stage quarterfinals
3	Netherlands	2	2	6	6	±0	Advance to knockout stage quarterfinals
4	Russia	1	3	5	7	−2	
5	Canada	0	4	1	11	−10	

Source: OWWC

Round 1	November 1	Canada	0	–	3	Russia	Anaheim, CA
	12:00 noon PST						Anaheim Convention Center
		1	Ilios			2	
		1	Numbani			2	
		2	Havana			3	

Round 1	November 1	China	3	–	0	Denmark	Anaheim, CA
	12:00 noon PST						Anaheim Convention Center
		2	Ilios			1	
		6	Numbani			5	
		2	Havana			0	

Round 2	November 1	China	2	–	1	Netherlands	Anaheim, CA
	1:15 pm PST						Anaheim Convention Center
		2	Oasis			1	
		3	Blizzard World			2	
		2	Route 66			3	

Round 2	November 1	Denmark	2	–	1	Russia	Anaheim, CA
	1:15 pm PST						Anaheim Convention Center
		2	Oasis			1	
		0	Blizzard World			1	
		3	Route 66			2	

Round 3	November 1	China	3	–	0	Russia	Anaheim, CA
	2:30 pm PST						Anaheim Convention Center
		2	Busan			0	
		4	King's Row			3	
		1	Watchpoint: Gibraltar			0	

Round 3	November 1	Canada	1	–	2	Netherlands	Anaheim, CA
	2:30 pm PST						Anaheim Convention Center
		0	Busan			2	
		3	King's Row			4	
		2	Watchpoint: Gibraltar			1	

Round 4	November 1	Denmark	2	–	1	Netherlands	Anaheim, CA
	3:45 pm PST						Anaheim Convention Center
		2	Lijiang Tower			1	
		1	Eichenwalde			2	
		1	Rialto			0	

Round 4	November 1	Canada	0	–	3	China	Anaheim, CA
	3:45 pm PST						Anaheim Convention Center
		0	Lijiang Tower			2	
		1	Eichenwalde			3	
		0	Rialto			2	

Round 5	November 1	Canada	0	–	3	Denmark	Anaheim, CA
	5:00 pm PST						Anaheim Convention Center
		1	Nepal			2	
		1	Hollywood			3	
		2	Junkertown			3	

Round 5	November 1	Russia	1	–	2	Netherlands	Anaheim, CA
	5:00 pm PST						Anaheim Convention Center
		0	Nepal			2	
		1	Hollywood			2	
		4	Junkertown			3	

== Knockout stage ==
The knockout stage took place on November 2. The six teams that moved on from the group stages participated in a single-elimination playoff. The winner of the finals was awarded a gold medal, while the loser was awarded silver. The two teams that lost in their respective semifinals match played each other for the bronze medal.

=== Bracket ===
Quarterfinals
Denmark	0
South Korea	3
France	3
Netherlands	1

Semifinals
United States	3
South Korea	1
China	3
France	1

Final
United States	3
China	0
Third place
South Korea	3
France	0

=== Quarterfinals ===
Quarterfinals	November 2	Denmark	0	–	3	South Korea	Anaheim, CA
	10:15 am PST						Anaheim Convention Center
		1	Lijiang Tower			2	
		3	Blizzard World			3	
		1	Junkertown			2	
		2	Volskaya Industries			2	
		0	Oasis			2	

Quarterfinals	November 2	France	3	–	1	Netherlands	Anaheim, CA
	11:30 am PST						Anaheim Convention Center
		2	Lijiang Tower			1	
		4	Blizzard World			5	
		1	Junkertown			0	
		1	Volskaya Industries			0	

=== Semifinals ===
Semifinals	November 2	United States	3	–	1	South Korea	Anaheim, CA
	1:30 pm PST						Anaheim Convention Center
		1	Busan			2	
		2	Hollywood			1	
		5	Watchpoint: Gibraltar			3	
		3	Horizon Lunar Colony			3	
		2	Nepal			0	

Semifinals	November 2	China	3	–	1	France	Anaheim, CA
	3:00 pm PST						Anaheim Convention Center
		1	Busan			2	
		3	Hollywood			0	
		2	Watchpoint: Gibraltar			0	
		1	Horizon Lunar Colony			1	
		2	Nepal			0	

=== Third place ===
Third place	November 2	South Korea	3	–	0	France	Anaheim, CA
	5:00 pm PST						Anaheim Convention Center
		2	Ilios			0	
		3	King's Row			2	
		3	Dorado			0	

=== Finals ===
Finals	November 2	United States	3	–	0	China	Anaheim, CA
	7:15 pm PST						Anaheim Convention Center
		2	Ilios			1	
		3	King's Row			2	
		3	Dorado			1	
