= 2017 Overwatch World Cup =

Esports tournament

Tournament information
- Game: Overwatch
- Dates: November 3–4
- Administrator: Blizzard Entertainment
- Tournament format: Knockout
- Venues: 5 (in 5 host cities): Yun Space, Shanghai (group stage); The Star Event Centre, Sydney (group stage); ESL Arena, Poland (group stage); Barker Hangar, Santa Monica (group stage); Anaheim Convention Center, Anaheim (final 8)
- Teams: 32

Final positions
- Champions: South Korea
- 1st runner-up: Canada
- 2nd runner-up: Sweden
- MVP: (Canada) Félix "xQc" Lengyel

The 2017 Overwatch World Cup was an Overwatch esports tournament, organized by Blizzard Entertainment, the game's developer. It was the second Overwatch World Cup and featured 32 represented nations from around the world, with the final tournament taking place at the Anaheim Convention Center from November 3–4, 2017.

The event had notably been controversial and criticized due to several issues, including China's visa denial, Twitch MVP voting, and redrawing of playoff matches. Twitch streams of the event accumulated over 5.4 million views.

The final took place on November 4 between South Korea and Canada. South Korea won 4–1, winning their second straight World Cup title.

== Teams ==
=== Players and committees ===
Each qualified region had three representatives form that region's Competition Committee. Blizzard chose a shortlist of candidates for each nation, in which the players and viewers of their respective nations voted from April 30 to May 5 on to become their nations committee. The committee members of each nation were announced on May 8. They players representing each country were selected by their National Competition Committee.

=== Qualification ===
The top 32 countries/regions based on the average skill rating of the top 100 players from that particular country/region qualified for the tournament. Qualification began on March 29, and the qualified countries were announced on April 25. The top 32 national teams were seeded into eight groups spread across four different regions: Shanghai, Sydney, Katowice and Santa Monica, California. Each group played a round-robin schedule of matches. The top two teams in each group advanced to a single-elimination, one-game playoff bracket to qualify for the final tournament at BlizzCon.

Qualified Did not qualify

Qualified by skill rating (32)

- China
- South Korea
- United States
- Sweden
- Finland
- United Kingdom
- Canada
- France
- Denmark
- Russia
- Germany
- Japan
- Australia
- Chinese Taipei
- Netherlands
- Hong Kong
- Norway
- Poland
- Brazil
- Italy
- Spain
- Israel
- Singapore
- Thailand
- Argentina
- Turkey
- Belgium
- Vietnam
- Portugal
- New Zealand
- Austria
- Romania

== Venues ==
2017 Overwatch World Cup is located in Earth
Shanghai	Sydney
Yun Space, Baoshan Venue	The Star Event Centre
Yun Space, Baoshan Venue	Capacity: 1,500
Katowice	Santa Monica
ESL Arena	Barker Hangar
Capacity: 150	Capacity: 1,600
Anaheim
Anaheim Convention Center
Capacity: 7,500

== Group stage ==
=== Shanghai qualifier ===
Group A
Pos	Team	MR (W-D-L)	GR	RD	Qualification
1	China (H)	3–0–0	12–0	+12	Advance to group finals
2	Norway	2–0–1	7–5	+2	Advance to group finals
3	Hong Kong	0–1–2	3–9	−6	
4	Romania	0–1–2	2–10	−8	

Group B
Pos	Team	MR (W-D-L)	GR	RD	Qualification
1	France	3–0–0	10–2	+10	Advance to group finals
2	Thailand	1–1–1	7–5	+2	Advance to group finals
3	Denmark	1–1–1	6–6	+0	
4	Argentina	0–0–3	1–11	−10	

Group Finals
A1	China	3
B2	Thailand	0
B1	France	3
A2	Norway	0

Source: OWWC

=== Sydney qualifier ===
Group C
Pos	Team	MR (W-D-L)	GR	RD	Qualification
1	Sweden	2–1–0	9–3	+6	Advance to group finals
2	Australia (H)	2–0–1	9–3	+6	Advance to group finals
3	Portugal	1–1–1	6–6	+0	
4	Italy	0–0–3	0–12	−12	

Group D
Pos	Team	MR (W-D-L)	GR	RD	Qualification
1	Japan	2–1–0	9–3	+6	Advance to group finals
2	Spain	2–0–1	9–3	+6	Advance to group finals
3	Finland	1–1–1	6–6	+0	
4	Vietnam	0–0–3	0–12	−12	

Group Finals
C1	Sweden	3
D2	Spain	0
D1	Japan	2
C2	Australia	3

Source: OWWC

=== Katowice qualifier ===
Group E
Pos	Team	MR (W-D-L)	GR	RD	Qualification
1	South Korea	3–0–0	12–0	+12	Advance to group finals
2	Netherlands	2–0–1	8–4	+4	Advance to group finals
3	Poland (H)	1–0–2	4–8	−4	
4	Austria	0–0–3	0–12	−12	

Group F
Pos	Team	MR (W-D-L)	GR	RD	Qualification
1 (Note: Canada placed ahead of Russia by a tiebreaker match.)	Canada	2–1–0	10–2	+8	Advance to group finals
2	Russia	2–1–0	10–2	+8	Advance to group finals
3	Singapore	0–1–2	2–8	−6	
4	Turkey	0–1–2	2–8	−6	

Group Finals
E1	Canada	3
F2	Netherlands	0
F1	South Korea	3
E2	Russia	0

Source: OWWC

=== Santa Monica qualifier ===
Group G
Pos	Team	MR (W-D-L)	GR	RD	Qualification
1	United States (H)	3–0–0	11–1	+10	Advance to group finals
2	Chinese Taipei	2–0–1	9–3	+6	Advance to group finals
3	Brazil	1–0–2	3–9	−6	
4	New Zealand	0–0–3	1–11	−10	

Group H
Pos	Team	MR (W-D-L)	GR	RD	Qualification
1	United Kingdom	3–0–0	12–0	+12	Advance to group finals
2	Germany	2–0–1	7–6	+1	Advance to group finals
3	Israel	1–0–2	5–8	−3	
4	Belgium	0–0–3	1–11	−10	

Group Finals
G1	United States	3
H2	Germany	0
H1	United Kingdom	3
G2	Chinese Taipei	0

Source: OWWC

== Knockout stage ==
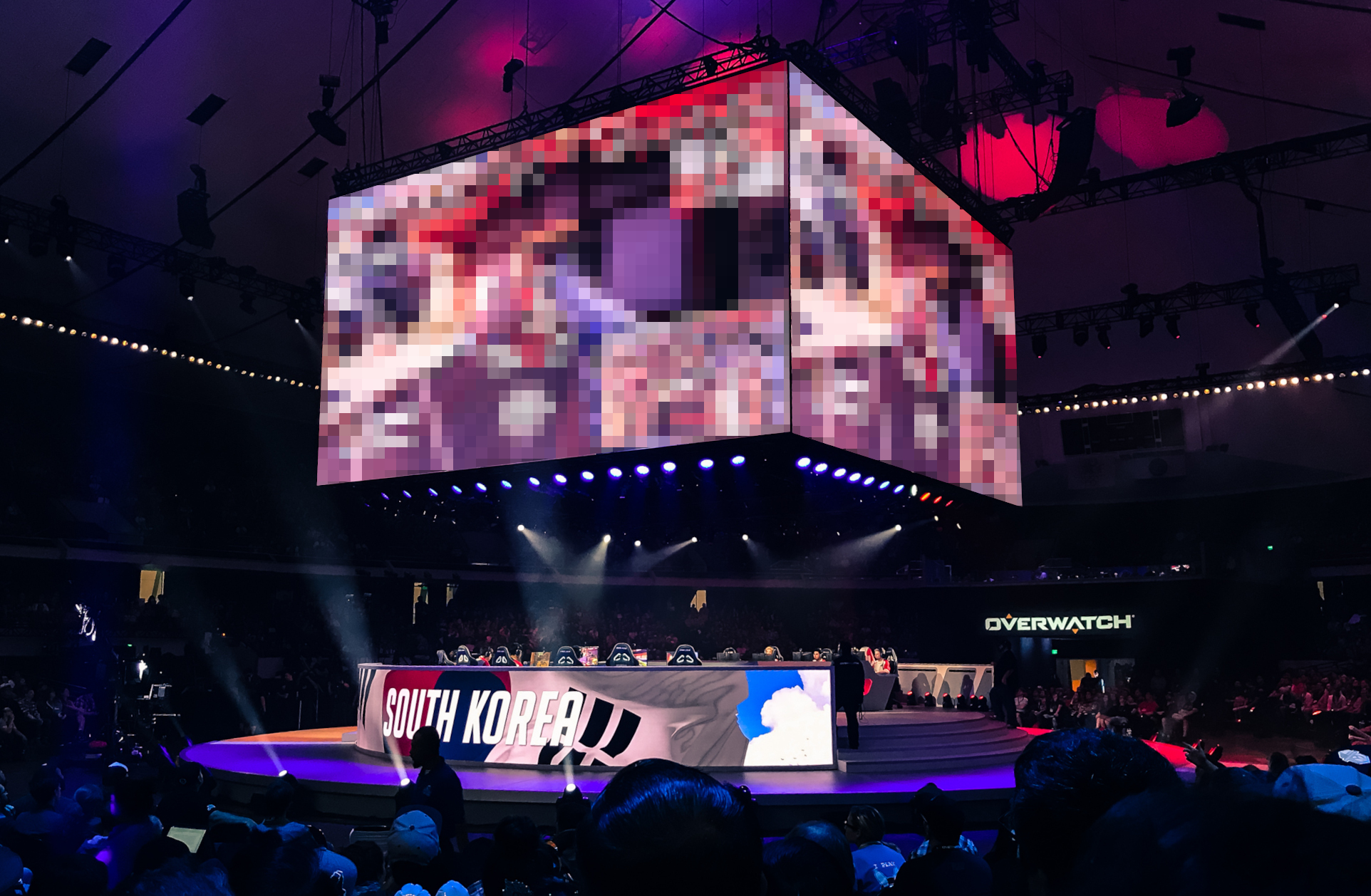
South Korea versus Canada in the 2017 Overwatch World Cup Finals.

On August 28, brackets were drawn to determine the match-ups for the quarterfinals. The bracket draw was only announced after the final group stage, which is one of the reasons why many people believe that Blizzard added in a bracket draw to prevent team USA from playing South Korea in the quarterfinals as that was the match-up by default after the group stage. A week before the actual playoff stage, 4 out of 6 players in China's Overwatch World Cup team were denied from the tournament due to visa issues, receiving widespread criticism.

Quarterfinals and semifinals were both supposed to be played on Nov 3, but due to the quarterfinals games running later than expected, the semifinals games were moved to Nov 4, right before the final match.

=== Bracket ===
Quarterfinals
China	1
France	3
South Korea	4
United States	2
United Kingdom	0
Sweden	3
Canada	3
Australia	2

Semifinals
France	1
South Korea	3
Sweden	2
Canada	3

Finals
South Korea	4
Canada	1
Third place
Sweden	4
France	2

== Awards ==
Most Valuable Player (MVP): xQc
