= Overwatch World Cup =

Annual esports tournament

- Current season, competition or edition: 2026 Overwatch World Cup
- Game: Overwatch
- First season: 2016
- Continent: International
- Most recent champion: South Korea
- Most titles: South Korea (4 titles)
- Broadcasters: Global; Major League Gaming; Twitch; United States; ESPN/Disney XD/ABC

The Overwatch World Cup (OWWC) is an annual international Overwatch esports tournament organized by Blizzard Entertainment, the game's developer. Unlike other Overwatch tournaments, the World Cup is contested by national teams representing their respective countries. The tournament ran annually from 2016 to 2019, after which it returned in 2023 and 2026.

The tournament format varies each year, but to date, the top-ranked teams from each World Cup's group stage have advanced to a playoff bracket held at BlizzCon.

South Korea won the first three World Cups and reclaimed their title in 2026, while the United States and Saudi Arabia won 2019 and 2023, respectively.

== History ==
According to former lead game director Jeff Kaplan, Overwatch was not developed with any dedication towards esports. Dan Szymborski of ESPN stated that Overwatch was poised as the next big esport for having a sufficiently different look and playstyle from established esports games like Counter-Strike: Global Offensive and Call of Duty, enough variety in maps and characters, and strong support from Blizzard to maintain the game for a long time. Bryant Francis writing for Gamasutra noted the speed and short match times of Overwatch make the game highly favorable for viewership, further supporting the title as an esports. Overwatch's progression into esports was described by Rolling Stone as a "strategy [that] involved carefully rolling out the game in steps – first a closed beta, then open beta, then full release, then a competitive mode and finally a league."

In June 2016, the esports organizer ESL announced that they would host the first international Overwatch competition in August 2016, called Overwatch Atlantic Showdown. The competition used four open qualifiers beginning in June, followed by regional qualifiers and then a final online qualifier. Eight teams then competed for a six-figure prize in the finals to be held at Gamescom 2016 from August 20–21. Turner Broadcasting's ELeague announced the first Overwatch Open tournament, starting in July 2016, with a total prize pool of $300,000, with plans to broadcast the finals on Turner's cable channel TBS in September 2016. In August 2016, Blizzard announced their own Overwatch international tournament, allowing users to vote for teams to represent their nation or region. Over 3 million votes to decide national teams were cast. The inaugural Overwatch World Cup was watched by 100,000 people at BlizzCon 2016. The South Korean team won the tournament, defeating the Russian team 4–0 in the final round.

In March 2017, Blizzard announced Overwatch World Cup 2017. The selection of national teams for the 2017 World Cup was different from 2016 in that participating nations were required to vote for an Overwatch World Cup National Committee. The National Committees were based upon nominations chosen by Blizzard; according to Blizzard, "analysts, coaches, statisticians, and other authorities" recommended rosters for all stages of the competition. Blizzard announced the 2017 World Cup participants in April. The 2017 World Cup experienced an issue with several players on the Chinese team being denied visas to enter the United States for the final round, causing four players on the team to be replaced by substitutes.

== Format ==
=== Prior tournaments ===
The 2016 format had four qualifying tournaments to thin the field for the final tournament, while the 2017 and 2018 formats used an average skill rating of each country's top players to determine which countries qualified for the tournament. Qualified teams were divided into round-robin style groups – 4 groups in 2016, 8 in 2017, and 4 in 2018. In every year, teams that made it past the group stages moved on a single-elimination playoff bracket.

The 2019 World Cup took place across three stages: preliminary rounds, group stages, and playoffs. A country's national ranking was determined by a point-ranking system based on final placements in the previous World Cups. Any country wishing to participate was eligible to play in the preliminary rounds, a single-elimination, seeded bracket. The top five countries based on their national ranking were not required to play in the preliminary rounds and received a bye to the group stages. The seeding was based on the national rankings, and the top five countries from the preliminary rounds advanced to the group stages. The Group Stages took place on November 1, 2019. The ten countries competing in the group stages were split evenly into two round-robin style groups. The top three countries from each group advanced to the knockout stage on November 2, with the top-ranked country from each group receiving a bye to the semifinals. The four other countries that advanced from the group stage would play in the quarterfinals. The winners of the finals would be awarded a gold medal, while the losers would be awarded silver. The two teams that lost in their respective semifinals match would play each other for the bronze medal.

== Broadcasting ==
The World Cup was broadcast through live stream channels via the Twitch platform. Official live stream broadcast channels were provided in English, Chinese, Korean, French, Russian, German, Japanese, and Thai. Other languages were broadcast through community–run channels on the official Overwatch World Cup team page. Prior to the third edition of the event, Disney and Blizzard Entertainment announced a multi-year deal for coverage of Overwatch esports.

== Results ==
Edition	Year	Hosts	Champions	Score and Venue	Runners-up	Third place	Score and Venue	Fourth place	No. of teams
1	2016	United States	South Korea	4–0; Anaheim Convention Center, Anaheim	Russia	Sweden	2–1; Anaheim Convention Center, Anaheim	Finland	16
2	2017	Australia; China; Poland; United States	South Korea	4–1; Anaheim Convention Center, Anaheim	Canada	Sweden	4–2; Anaheim Convention Center, Anaheim	France	32
3	2018	France; South Korea; Thailand; United States	South Korea	4–0; Anaheim Convention Center, Anaheim	China	Canada	3–2; Anaheim Convention Center, Anaheim	United Kingdom	24
4	2019	United States	United States	3–0; Anaheim Convention Center, Anaheim	China	South Korea	3–0; Anaheim Convention Center, Anaheim	France	10
5	2023	United States	Saudi Arabia	3–2; Anaheim Convention Center, Anaheim	China	Finland	3–2; Anaheim Convention Center, Anaheim	South Korea	16
6	2026	South Korea; United States	South Korea	4–1; Anaheim Convention Center, Anaheim	Saudi Arabia	France	3–1; Anaheim Convention Center, Anaheim	Sweden	16

=== Teams reaching the top four ===
Teams reaching the top four
Team	Champions	Runners-up	Third place	Fourth place	Total
South Korea	4 (2016, 2017, 2018, 2026)	–	1 (2019)	1 (2023)	6
Saudi Arabia	1 (2023)	1 (2026)	–	–	2
United States	1 (2019)	–	–	–	1
China	–	3 (2018, 2019, 2023)	–	–	3
Canada	–	1 (2017)	1 (2018)	–	2
Russia	–	1 (2016)	–	–	1
Sweden	–	–	2 (2016, 2017)	1 (2026)	3
Finland	–	–	1 (2023)	1 (2016)	2
France	–	–	1 (2026)	2 (2017, 2019)	3
United Kingdom	–	–	–	1 (2018)	1

Source: OWWC

== Awards ==
An MVP award for the Final Round of the OWWC had been awarded since the inaugural tournament in 2016.

Overwatch World Cup MVPs
World Cup	Country	Ref.
2016	(South Korea) Gong "Miro" Jin-hyuk	
2017	(Canada) Félix "xQc" Lengyel	
2018	(South Korea) Bang "JJoNak" Sung-hyeon	
2019	(United States) Jay "sinatraa" Won	
2023	Not awarded	
2026	(South Korea) Kim "Simple" Ji-sung	

== See also ==
- Development of Overwatch
- Overwatch League
