= 2018 Overwatch World Cup =

Esports tournament

Tournament information
- Game: Overwatch
- Date: August 17 – November 2
- Administrator: Blizzard Entertainment
- Tournament format(s): Round-robin and Knockout
- Venues: 5 (in 5 host cities): Studio Paradise, Incheon (group stage); Blizzard Arena, Burbank (group stage); Royal Paragon Hall, Bangkok (group stage); Espace Grande Arche, Paris (group stage); Anaheim Convention Center, Anaheim (final 8)
- Teams: 24

Final positions
- Champions: South Korea
- 1st runner-up: China
- 2nd runner-up: Canada
- MVP: (South Korea) Bang "JJonak" Sung-hyeon

The 2018 Overwatch World Cup was an Overwatch esports tournament, organized by Blizzard Entertainment, the game's developer. It was the third Overwatch World Cup. It featured 24 represented nations from around the world, with the final tournament taking place at the Anaheim Convention Center during BlizzCon from November 2–3, 2018.

The final took place on November 2 between South Korea and China. South Korea won 4–0, winning their third straight World Cup title.

== Teams ==
=== Committees ===
Each country has a National Competition Committee, consisting of a general manager, head coach, and community lead. Blizzard selected each team's general manager, while the head coach and community leads were selected through a two-step voting process, that took place from May 24 to May 30.

Any player with a Blizzard account in good standing was welcome to apply for a head coaching position for their country; the country's top 150 players voted for who they would like to be their country's head coach. The top three candidates from the first round of voting moved on to a second round of voting, and the person with the most votes in the second round was selected as the country's head coach.

The community leaders are responsible for "rallying their community and marketing their team to the masses." Like the head coaches, the community lead for each country was chosen through a two-step voting process. A country's entire player base voted for the community lead. After the first round of voting, the top 10 from that round were candidates for the second round; the person with the most votes in the second round was selected as their country's community lead.

=== Players ===
They players representing each country were selected by their National Competition Committee. The Committees selected up to 12 players from June 1 to July 5 to represent their country and then had to cut it down to 7 players to be their final roster.

=== Qualification ===
From March 28 to April 28, 2018, Blizzard tracked the average skill rating of the top 150 players from the top 20 countries to determine the countries who qualified for the tournament. The four host countries, South Korea, Thailand, France, and the United States, automatically qualified.

Automatically qualified as Hosts (4)

- France
- South Korea
- Thailand
- United States

Qualified by skill rating (20)

- China
- United Kingdom
- Sweden
- Canada
- Finland
- Germany
- Denmark
- Russia
- Netherlands
- Japan

- Norway
- Italy
- Australia
- Austria
- Hong Kong
- Spain
- Poland
- Chinese Taipei
- Switzerland
- Brazil

Automatically qualified Qualified Did not qualify

== Venues ==
2018 Overwatch World Cup is located in Earth
Incheon	Bangkok
Studio Paradise	Royal Paragon Hall
Capacity: 2,300	Capacity: 2,000
Los Angeles	Paris
Blizzard Arena	Espace Grande Arche
Capacity: 450	Capacity: 2,500
Anaheim
Anaheim Convention Center
Capacity: 7,500

== Group stage ==
The top 24 national teams were grouped into four different round-robin style groups, with the matches played in Incheon, Los Angeles, Bangkok, and Paris. The top two teams in each group advanced to a single-elimination playoff bracket, with the matches played in Anaheim.

=== Incheon stage ===
Pos	Team	W	L	MW	ML	MD	Qualification
1	South Korea (H)	5	0	19	2	+17	Advance to playoffs
2	Finland	4	1	16	4	+12	Advance to playoffs
3	Russia	3	2	12	7	+5	
4	Japan	2	3	8	12	−4	
5	Chinese Taipei	1	4	5	15	−10	
6	Hong Kong	0	5	0	20	−20	

Day 1	August 17	Russia	4	–	0	Hong Kong	Incheon, KR
							Studio Paradise

Day 1	August 17	South Korea	4	–	0	Chinese Taipei	Incheon, KR
							Studio Paradise

Day 1	August 17	Hong Kong	0	–	4	Finland	Incheon, KR
							Studio Paradise

Day 1	August 17	Russia	3	–	1	Japan	Incheon, KR
							Studio Paradise

Day 1	August 17	Finland	2	–	3	South Korea	Incheon, KR
							Studio Paradise

Day 2	August 18	Hong Kong	0	–	4	South Korea	Incheon, KR
							Studio Paradise

Day 2	August 18	Japan	3	–	1	Chinese Taipei	Incheon, KR
							Studio Paradise

Day 2	August 18	Russia	1	–	2	Finland	Incheon, KR
							Studio Paradise

Day 2	August 18	Chinese Taipei	4	–	0	Hong Kong	Incheon, KR
							Studio Paradise

Day 2	August 18	South Korea	4	–	0	Japan	Incheon, KR
							Studio Paradise

Day 3	August 19	Finland	4	–	0	Japan	Incheon, KR
							Studio Paradise

Day 3	August 19	Russia	4	–	0	Chinese Taipei	Incheon, KR
							Studio Paradise

Day 3	August 19	Japan	4	–	0	Hong Kong	Incheon, KR
							Studio Paradise

Day 3	August 19	Russia	0	–	4	South Korea	Incheon, KR
							Studio Paradise

Day 3	August 19	Chinese Taipei	0	–	4	Finland	Incheon, KR
							Studio Paradise

Source: OWWC

=== Los Angeles stage ===
Pos	Team	W	L	MW	ML	MD	Qualification
1	United States (H)	5	0	18	2	+16	Advance to playoffs
2	Canada	4	1	17	3	+14	Advance to playoffs
3	Brazil	3	2	10	11	−1	
4	Norway	2	3	8	13	−5	
5	Austria	1	4	5	16	−11	
6	Switzerland	0	5	4	17	−13	

Day 1	September 7	Austria	0	–	4	Canada	Los Angeles, CA
							Blizzard Arena

Day 1	September 7	Norway	3	–	1	Switzerland	Los Angeles, CA
							Blizzard Arena

Day 1	September 7	Canada	4	–	0	Brazil	Los Angeles, CA
							Blizzard Arena

Day 1	September 7	Austria	0	–	4	United States	Los Angeles, CA
							Blizzard Arena

Day 1	September 7	Norway	2	–	3	Brazil	Los Angeles, CA
							Blizzard Arena

Day 2	September 8	Switzerland	2	–	3	Austria	Los Angeles, CA
							Blizzard Arena

Day 2	September 8	Brazil	1	–	3	United States	Los Angeles, CA
							Blizzard Arena

Day 2	September 8	Norway	0	–	4	Canada	Los Angeles, CA
							Blizzard Arena

Day 2	September 8	United States	4	–	0	Switzerland	Los Angeles, CA
							Blizzard Arena

Day 2	September 8	Brazil	3	–	1	Austria	Los Angeles, CA
							Blizzard Arena

Day 3	September 9	Norway	3	–	1	Austria	Los Angeles, CA
							Blizzard Arena

Day 3	September 9	Canada	4	–	0	Switzerland	Los Angeles, CA
							Blizzard Arena

Day 3	September 9	Norway	0	–	4	United States	Los Angeles, CA
							Blizzard Arena

Day 3	September 9	Switzerland	1	–	3	Brazil	Los Angeles, CA
							Blizzard Arena

Day 3	September 9	Canada	1	–	3	United States	Los Angeles, CA
							Blizzard Arena

Source: OWWC

=== Bangkok stage ===
Pos	Team	W	L	MW	ML	MD	Qualification
1	China	5	0	16	7	+9	Advance to playoffs
2	Australia	3	2	14	7	+7	Advance to playoffs
3	Denmark	3	2	12	9	+3	
4	Sweden	3	2	11	10	+1	
5	Thailand (H)	1	4	7	14	−7	
6	Spain	0	5	3	16	−13	

Day 1	September 14	Denmark	3	–	1	Thailand	Bangkok, TH
							Royal Paragon Hall

Day 1	September 14	Spain	1	–	3	Australia	Bangkok, TH
							Royal Paragon Hall

Day 1	September 14	China	3	–	1	Sweden	Bangkok, TH
							Royal Paragon Hall

Day 1	September 14	Spain	1	–	2	Denmark	Bangkok, TH
							Royal Paragon Hall

Day 1	September 14	Thailand	0	–	4	Australia	Bangkok, TH
							Royal Paragon Hall

Day 2	September 15	Australia	1	–	3	Denmark	Bangkok, TH
							Royal Paragon Hall

Day 2	September 15	China	3	–	2	Thailand	Bangkok, TH
							Royal Paragon Hall

Day 2	September 15	Sweden	0	–	4	Australia	Bangkok, TH
							Royal Paragon Hall

Day 2	September 15	Denmark	2	–	3	China	Bangkok, TH
							Royal Paragon Hall

Day 2	September 15	Spain	0	–	4	Sweden	Bangkok, TH
							Royal Paragon Hall

Day 3	September 16	Thailand	1	–	3	Sweden	Bangkok, TH
							Royal Paragon Hall

Day 3	September 16	Spain	0	–	4	China	Bangkok, TH
							Royal Paragon Hall

Day 3	September 16	Sweden	3	–	2	Denmark	Bangkok, TH
							Royal Paragon Hall

Day 3	September 16	Australia	2	–	3	China	Bangkok, TH
							Royal Paragon Hall

Day 3	September 16	Spain	1	–	3	Thailand	Bangkok, TH
							Royal Paragon Hall

Source: OWWC

=== Paris stage ===
Pos	Team	W	L	MW	ML	MD	Qualification
1	France (H)	5	0	19	2	+17	Advance to playoffs
2	United Kingdom	4	1	15	5	+10	Advance to playoffs
3	Netherlands	3	2	10	10	±0	
4	Germany	2	3	10	12	−2	
5	Italy	1	4	5	16	−11	
6	Poland	0	5	4	18	−14	

Day 1	September 21	Netherlands	0	–	4	France	Paris, FR
							Espace Grande Arche

Day 1	September 21	Germany	1	–	3	United Kingdom	Paris, FR
							Espace Grande Arche

Day 1	September 21	Poland	2	–	3	Italy	Paris, FR
							Espace Grande Arche

Day 1	September 21	Netherlands	3	–	1	Germany	Paris, FR
							Espace Grande Arche

Day 1	September 21	Poland	0	–	4	United Kingdom	Paris, FR
							Espace Grande Arche

Day 2	September 22	Germany	2	–	3	France	Paris, FR
							Espace Grande Arche

Day 2	September 22	Italy	1	–	3	Netherlands	Paris, FR
							Espace Grande Arche

Day 2	September 22	Poland	2	–	3	Germany	Paris, FR
							Espace Grande Arche

Day 2	September 22	Italy	0	–	4	France	Paris, FR
							Espace Grande Arche

Day 2	September 22	Netherlands	0	–	4	United Kingdom	Paris, FR
							Espace Grande Arche

Day 3	September 23	Italy	1	–	3	Germany	Paris, FR
							Espace Grande Arche

Day 3	September 23	Poland	0	–	4	France	Paris, FR
							Espace Grande Arche

Day 3	September 23	Italy	0	–	4	United Kingdom	Paris, FR
							Espace Grande Arche

Day 3	September 23	Poland	0	–	4	Netherlands	Paris, FR
							Espace Grande Arche

Day 3	September 23	United Kingdom	0	–	4	France	Paris, FR
							Espace Grande Arche

Source: OWWC

== Knockout stage ==
The top two teams from each group advanced to the playoff bracket. All of the playoff rounds took place at the Anaheim Convention Center in Anaheim, California during BlizzCon.

To coincide with the event, Blizzard launched the "Overwatch World Cup Viewer," a standalone program that allows users to view World Cup matches in real time in Overwatch's spectator mode, roam around the map in a free camera, and take the perspectives of the players. Users were also able to view replays of each map played in the client.

=== Bracket ===
Quarterfinals
United States	1
United Kingdom	3
South Korea	3
Australia	0
China	3
Finland	0
France	0
Canada	3

Semifinals
United Kingdom	0
South Korea	2
China	3
Canada	0

Final
South Korea	4
China	0
Third place
United Kingdom	2
Canada	3

=== Quarterfinals ===
Quarterfinals	November 2	United States	1	–	3	United Kingdom	Anaheim, CA
	1:15 pm PDT						Anaheim Convention Center
		2	Ilios			0	
		0	King's Row			1	
		3	Volskaya Industries			4	
		2	Route 66			3	

Quarterfinals	November 2	South Korea	3	–	0	Australia	Anaheim, CA
	7:15 pm PDT						Anaheim Convention Center
		2	Busan			0	
		3	Blizzard World			2	
		2	Temple of Anubis			1	

Quarterfinals	November 2	China	3	–	0	Finland	Anaheim, CA
	5:15 pm PDT						Anaheim Convention Center
		2	Lijiang Tower			1	
		3	Hollywood			1	
		4	Hanamura			3	

Quarterfinals	November 2	France	0	–	3	Canada	Anaheim, CA
	3:15 pm PDT						Anaheim Convention Center
		1	Busan			2	
		2	Eichenwalde			3	
		4	Temple of Anubis			5	

=== Semifinals ===
Semifinals	November 3	United Kingdom	0	–	2	South Korea	Anaheim, CA
	9:30 am PDT						Anaheim Convention Center
		1	Nepal			2	
		3	King's Row			3	
		3	Volskaya Industries			3	
		1	Rialto			2	

Semifinals	November 3	China	3	–	0	Canada	Anaheim, CA
	11:30 am PDT						Anaheim Convention Center
		2	Oasis			1	
		3	Blizzard World			0	
		2	Temple of Anubis			1	

=== Third place ===
Third place	November 3	United Kingdom	2	–	3	Canada	Anaheim, CA
	1:30 pm PDT						Anaheim Convention Center
		2	Busan			0	
		1	Blizzard World			2	
		3	Volskaya Industries			2	
		2	Junkertown			3	
		0	Lijiang Tower			2	

=== Finals ===
Finals	November 3	South Korea	4	–	0	China	Anaheim, CA
	3:45 pm PDT						Anaheim Convention Center
		2	Ilios			0	
		3	King's Row			1	
		2	Temple of Anubis			1	
		4	Watchpoint: Gibraltar			3	
