= Birdring =

South Korean esports player

birdring
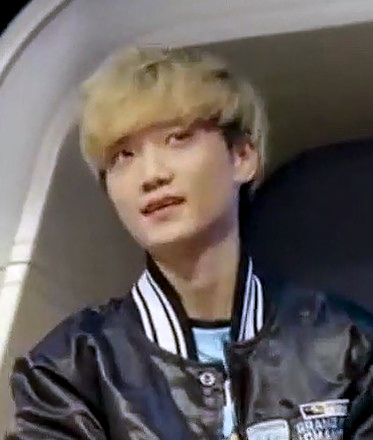
- Birdring at the 2018 Grand Finals

Personal information
- Name: Kim Ji-hyeok (김지혁)
- Born: 1998 or 1999 (age 27–28)
- Nationality: South Korean

Career information
- Game: Overwatch
- Playing career: 2016–2021, 2023–present
- Role: Damage

Team history
- 2016–2017: KongDoo Uncia
- 2017: KongDoo Panthera
- 2017: Cloud9 KongDoo
- 2018–2019: London Spitfire
- 2020–2021: Los Angeles Gladiators
- 2023: Boston Uprising

Career highlights and awards
- OWL champion (2018); No. 20 retired by London Spitfire; OWL All-Star (2018)

Kim Ji-hyeok (Korean: 김지혁), better known by his online alias Birdring, is a South Korean professional Overwatch player who played for several teams in the Overwatch League (OWL). He is best known for playing hitscan damage heroes, such as the sniper Widowmaker and highly-mobile Tracer. Prior to the OWL's inception, he played for KongDoo Uncia, KongDoo Panthera, and Cloud9 KongDoo. Birdring signed with the London Spitfire of the OWL in the league's inaugural season wherein he was selected to play in the All-Star Game and won the league's first Grand Finals, after the Spitfire defeated the Philadelphia Fusion. After two seasons with the Spitfire, Birdring signed with the Los Angeles Gladiators. After two seasons with the Gladiators, Birdring retired from professional Overwatch. He came out of retirement a year later and joined the Boston Uprising.

== Early life ==
According to Birdring in an interview, he dropped out of high school to pursue a career as a professional gamer.

== Professional career ==
Before transitioning to Overwatch, Birdring dedicated significant time to pursuing a professional career in League of Legends. He invested his efforts in solo queue, hoping to catch the attention of teams, and achieved Challenger rank on three servers: Korea, Japan, and China. Despite receiving offers from teams in Japan and China, Birdring faced an obstacle due to his age, as he was not yet 17 years old, which prevented him from participating in LCS-affiliated matches. This led him to take a break from League of Legends and explore Overwatch, a new and popular game at the time. He found Overwatch to be fun and engaging, which gradually shifted his focus away from League of Legends. While waiting to reach the eligible age, Birdring quickly climbed the ranks in Overwatch. He the joined an amateur team to start playing the game competitively. Soon after, Kongdoo Company announced tryouts, and Birdring, encouraged by a friend, decided to apply. Among numerous applicants, he secured a spot on the team.

=== Early career ===
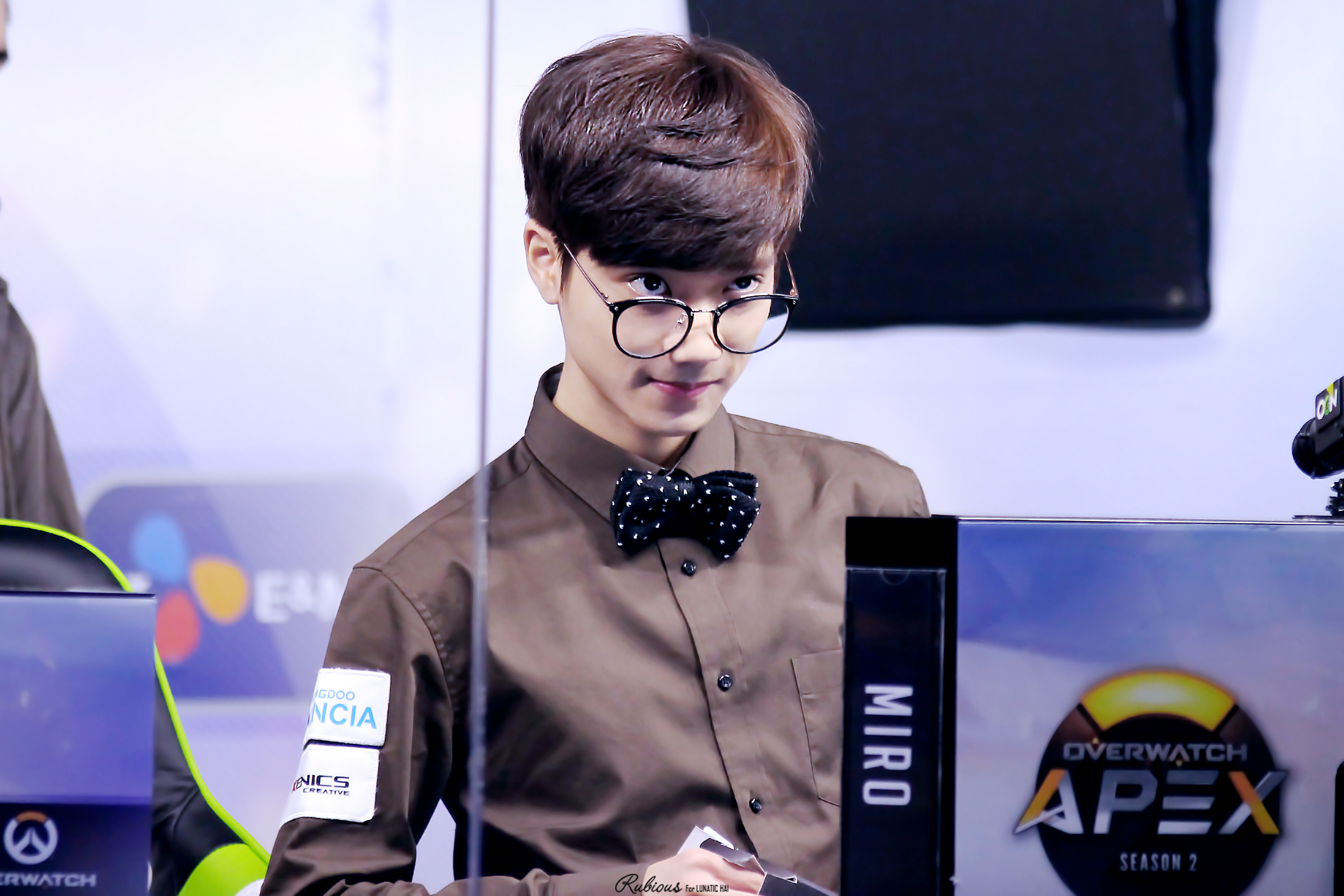
Birdring at the APEX season 2 quarterfinals

Joining Kongdoo Uncia for the inaugural season of OGN Overwatch APEX, Birdring's team established itself as a formidable contender. Despite a challenging start with a defeat against BK Stars, Uncia demonstrated resilience by winning subsequent matches and advancing to the semifinals. However, their journey ended in a closely contested 3–2 match against Team EnVyUs, the eventual champions.

In Season 2, Kongdoo Uncia went undefeated in the group stage. However, they faced setbacks in the knockout stage, losing to Lunatic-Hai in the quarterfinals. Reflecting on Season 2, Birdring described it as a challenging time. Originally set to join Kongdoo Panthera, Uncia's sister team, at the beginning of the season, he ended up staying with Uncia for one more season to give it another shot. However, the team's results fell short of expectations, leaving Birdring stressed and dissatisfied with his own performance.

Following Season 2, Birdring transferred to Panthera. The move provided a sense of liberation for Birdring, as he felt he no longer carried the burden of being a cornerstone player. Birdring found support from talented teammates such as Rascal and Fissure. In Season 3 of OGN APEX, KongDoo Panthera reached the semifinals where they faced Team EnVyUs. In the match, Birdring delivered an exceptional Tracer performance, earning recognition from commentators and opponents. Panthera secured a decisive 4–0 victory over EnVyUs, securing their spot in the Grand Finals. In the APEX Season 3 Finals on July 29, 2017, Kongdoo Panthera, led by DPS duo Birdring and Rascal, faced reigning champions Lunatic-Hai. Despite Birdring's impressive Tracer play, Lunatic-Hai's coordination and strong support players secured them the victory.

In September 2017, Cloud9 acquired KongDoo Panthera and rebranded the team to Cloud9 KongDoo. The team competed in Season 4 of APEX and reached the semifinals before falling to team GC Busan. In the third place match against NC Foxes, Birdring, playing as Tracer, struggled early in the match. After rebounding from his early issues, he and the team went on to sweep NC Foxes, 4–0.

=== London Spitfire ===
In late 2017, Birdring signed with Cloud9's Overwatch League team London Spitfire for the league's upcoming inaugural season. Throughout Stage 1 of the season, Birdring, while playing as the sniper hero Widowmaker, eliminated 2.42 opponents for every 1 of his own deaths. The team found early success, reaching the Stage 1 Finals. In as 3–2 win over the New York Excelsior in the finals, Birdring, playing as damage hero McCree, had the highest first kill percentage among all players in the Stage 1 Playoffs at 28%. Birdring suffered a wrist injury in Stage 3, causing him to miss three weeks of the stage. With a 24–16 regular season record, the Spitfire entered the season playoffs as the fifth seed. Birdring was selected as a reserve for the 2018 All-Star Game, a game that took place at the end of the season; however, he sat out of the game due to a wrist injury.

Their first best-of-three series was against the Los Angeles Gladiators; the Gladiators won the first match, while the Spitfire won the second, leading to a third, and final, match. In the first map of match three, Birdring, playing as the damage hero Hanzo, sealed the victory for the Spitfire, using Hanzo's ultimate ability Dragonstrike to kill three of the Gladiators as time expired. In map two, Birdring, as Widowmaker, began the fight with a kill on Gladiators' damage player Lane "Surefour" Roberts, which became routine throughout the map, as the Spitfire won that map as well. London won the third map as well to defeat the Gladiators and advance to the semifinals. In the semifinals, the Spitfire faced the Los Angeles Valiant. London took the series with 3–1 and 3–0 wins, advancing them to the Grand Finals, where they faced the Philadelphia Fusion. In the first map of match one, Birdring, playing as Widowmaker, was picked off by Fusion damage player Lee "Carpe" Jae-hyeok, who also was playing as Widowmaker, near the end of the round, ultimately giving Philadelphia the map win. However, the Spitfire went on to win the match 3–1 and won the second match 3–0, giving Birdring and the team their first OWL title.

Through the first three stages of the 2019 season, the most prominent team composition, known as the meta, in the OWL consisted of running three tank heroes and three support heroes in which keeping tanks alive and sustaining over long periods of time were the highest priority. As a damage player, Birdring transitioned playing other roles, such as the support hero Brigitte, and at times, Baptiste. Through the first stage of the season, Birdring ranked 24th in damage dealt per 10 minutes, as the Spitfire struggles throughout the stage. After the first three stages of the season, the Spitfire were in sixth place in the regular season standings. In the final quarter of the season, the league implemented an enforced 2-2-2 role lock, where teams must use a team composition of two damage, two tank, and two support heroes, allowing Birdring to return to playing damage heroes. The team finished the regular season in seventh place with a 16–12 record, advancing them to the play-in tournament. With a bye into the final round of the play-ins, the Spitfire faced the Shanghai Dragons; Birdring struggled at times during the match, but ultimately, the team won and advanced to the season playoffs. In the playoffs, London fell to the New York Excelsior in the first round, sending them to the lower bracket of the double-elimination tournament. A loss to the San Francisco Shock in the first round of the lower bracket ended the Spitfire's playoff run. In October 2019, Birdring parted ways with the Spitfire.

As a member of the inaugural season champions, the Spitfire retired Birdring's number 20 jersey on January 15, 2020.

=== Los Angeles Gladiators ===
In November 2019, Birdring was signed by the Los Angeles Gladiators. In the knockouts of the May Melee, the first of three midseason tournaments of the season, Birdring played a multitude of damage heroes, such as Sombra, Tracer, and Reaper; the Gladiators defeated the Washington Justice in the first round but fell to the Philadelphia Fusion in the quarterfinals. In the final midseason tournament of the season, the Countdown Cup, the Gladiators faced the Toronto Defiant in the first round of the knockouts. In the final map of the match, Birdring played as Junkrat and achieved a "Fleta deadlift", a statistic named after Kim "Fleta" Byung-sun that occurs when one player accounts over half of their team's eliminations, as the Gladiators won 3–2. Los Angeles lost to the Philadelphia Fusion the following match. The Gladiators finished the regular season with the sixth seed in North America and advanced to the play-in tournament. The team defeated the Toronto Defiant in the play-ins to advance to the season playoffs; after the match Birdring collapsed during the live OWL broadcast. Los Angeles Gladiators' director of operations Brenda Suh said that Birdring experienced dizziness from dehydration and orthostatic hypotension. Despite the collapse, Birdring played the following day in the first round of the double-elimination North America bracket against the Fusion; Los Angeles lost the match 0–3. A 0–3 loss against the Florida Mayhem the following day ended the Gladiators' season.

Birdring and the Gladiators won the 2021 Countdown Cup, one of four midseason tournaments of the 2021 Overwatch League season. After the end of the 2021 playoffs, Birdring announced his retirement.

=== Boston Uprising ===
After one year, Birdring came out of retirement and joined the Boston Uprising prior to the 2023 season.
