= Profit (gamer) =

South Korean professional Overwatch player

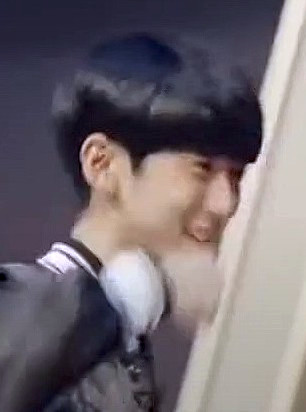

Personal information
- Name: 박준영 (Park Joon-yeong)
- Born: November 19, 1999 (age 27); Jinju, South Korea
- Nationality: South Korean

Career information
- Games: Overwatch
- Playing career: 2017–2023
- Role: Damage
- Number: 13

Team history
- 2017: GC Busan
- 2018–2019: London Spitfire
- 2020–2023: Seoul Dynasty

Career highlights and awards
- OWL champion (2018); OWL Grand Finals MVP (2018); No. 13 retired by London Spitfire; OWL Role Star (2022); 3× OWL All-Star (2018, 2019, 2020); OGN APEX champion (2017); OGN APEX Finals MVP (2017); APAC Premier champion (2017)

Park Joon-yeong (Korean: 박준영, born November 19, 1999), better known by his online alias Profit, is a South Korean professional Overwatch player. Profit began professional play with GC Busan, won OGN APEX Season 4, and was named the APEX Finals most valuable player. Park signed with the London Spitfire of the Overwatch League (OWL) for its inaugural season in 2018. He won the league's first Grand Finals with the Spitfire, after they defeated the Philadelphia Fusion, and was named the Grand Finals most valuable player. Profit was then signed by the Seoul Dynasty for the 2020 season, where he played for three seasons. In February 2024, Profit announced his retirement, before returning to the professional scene for the 2026 Overwatch Champions Series to play for Korean team Cheeseburger.

== Early years ==
Park was born on November 19, 1999, in Jinju, South Korea.

== Professional career ==
=== GC Busan ===
Park began his Overwatch career with Korean team GC Busan in April 2017. The team competed in OGN APEX Season 4, a premier Overwatch tournament series in South Korea. After defeating Cloud 9 KongDoo in the semifinals, they were set to take on RunAway in the best-of-seven finals. Park amassed 134 kills, 44 more than any other player, to only 55 deaths in the series, and led his team to a close 4–3 victory to win the championship. He was named the APEX Finals most valuable player for his performance throughout the series. He picked up another major championship after GC Busan defeated RunAway in the 2017 APAC Premier finals in China.

=== London Spitfire ===
Park, along with the entire GC Busan roster, signed with Cloud9's Overwatch League team London Spitfire in November 2017. Within the first two weeks of the 2018 season, Park was fined US$1,000 for giving the finger to his face camera during a league match; although he claimed that it was in response to a joke that was made off-camera by his team backstage, he publicly apologized for the gesture.

The team found early success, reaching the Stage 1 Finals. In as 3–2 win over the New York Excelsior in the finals, Park participated in 38.2 percent of his team's kills, better than any other player in the Stage 1 Playoffs. At the end of the 2018 regular season, Park was the highest-rated DPS player across all heroes. The Spitfire defeated the Los Angeles Gladiators and Los Angeles Valiant in the quarterfinals and semifinals, respectively, of the 2018 season playoffs; Park averaged 8,790 damage per 10 minutes in those two matches, second to Philadelphia Fusion's Josh "Eqo" Corona for all players in the playoffs. The Spitfire played the Fusion in the 2018 Grand Finals. In 3–1 and 3–0 victories over the Fusion, Park performed exceptionally well, most notably securing five final blows playing Tracer in the final 93 seconds on Volskaya Industries to secure a 1–0 lead in the best-of-three series. With numerous highlight-level plays throughout the series, Park was named the Grand Finals Most Valuable Player.

As a member of the inaugural season champions, the Spitfire retired Park's number 13 jersey on January 15, 2020.

=== Seoul Dynasty ===
On October 22, 2019, the Spitfire agreed to transfer Park, along with teammates Hong "Gesture" Jae-hee and Choi "Bdosin" Seung-tae, to the Seoul Dynasty. During 2020 the season, Park became the first OWL player to claim 10,000 total eliminations. With Park as a consistent starter, the Dynasty made a deep playoff run in the 2020 playoffs, but they lost in the Grand Finals to the San Francisco Shock, 4–2.

In the 2022 season, Park won the Kickoff Clash, the first midseason tournament of the season, after he and the Dynasty defeated the Philadelphia Fusion in the finals. At the end of the regular season, he was awarded a Role Star commendation and was a finalist for the league's regular season MVP award. The Dynasty qualified for the season playoffs and were knocked down to the lower bracket after a loss to the Dallas Fuel. After the loss, the Dynasty elected to start Park as the support character Kiriko in their following match against the San Francisco Shock, despite him generally playing damage characters. The shift in roles did not result in a win, however, as the Dynasty lost the match and fell out of the playoffs.

Following the folding of the Overwatch League, the Seoul Dynasty released its entire roster in October 2023. On February 20, 2024, Profit announced that he had retired from esports.

Awards and achievements
Preceded by Incumbent	OWL Grand Finals MVP; 2018	Succeeded by Choi "ChoiHyoBin" Hyo-bin
