= 2018 Overwatch League Grand Finals =

2018 OWL Grand Finals
Philadelphia Fusion		London Spitfire
1	Match 1	3
0	Match 2	3
- Dates: July 27–28, 2018
- Venue: Barclays Center, Brooklyn, New York, US
- Purse: $1.4 million
- Attendance: 22,434 (11,217 per match)
- MVP: Park "Profit" Joon-yeong (London Spitfire)

Live Broadcast
- Broadcasts: Disney XD; ESPN; ESPN3; Twitch
- Viewers: 10.8 million (worldwide)

The 2018 Overwatch League Grand Finals was the first championship series of the Overwatch League (OWL), which took place July 27–28, 2018. The series was the conclusion of the 2018 Overwatch League playoffs and was played between the London Spitfire and the Philadelphia Fusion at the Barclays Center in Brooklyn, New York.

London qualified for the playoffs as the fifth seed and defeated the fourth-seeded Los Angeles Gladiators and second-seeded Los Angeles Valiant in the playoffs. Philadelphia qualified for the playoffs as the sixth seed and defeated the third-seeded Boston Uprising and top-seeded New York Excelsior in the playoffs.

London Spitfire defeated Philadelphia Fusion in the first and second matches by scores of 3–1 and 3–0, respectively, to claim the title of Overwatch League Grand Finals Champions before a two-day attendance of 22,434 spectators.

== Road to the Grand Finals ==
The Grand Finals are the post-season championship series of the Overwatch League (OWL), a professional international esports league; the teams of the Grand Finals compete for a $1.4 million prize pool, where the winners receive $1 million. 2018 season was the first in OWL history and consisted of twelve teams in two divisions. Each team played 40 matches throughout the regular season. The playoffs were contested by six team – the two teams with the best regular season record in each division and the following four teams with the best regular season record, regardless of division.

At the conclusion of the regular season, both London and Philadelphia had regular season records of 24–16 and were the fifth and sixth seeds, respectively, making them the bottom two teams to qualify for the season playoffs. The teams faced each other five times throughout the 2018 season, with one of those match-ups being the Stage 2 Semifinals – a game in which Philadelphia won. Overall, Philadelphia had beaten London in three out of their five match-ups.

=== London Spitfire ===
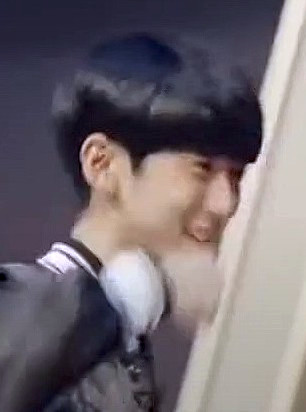
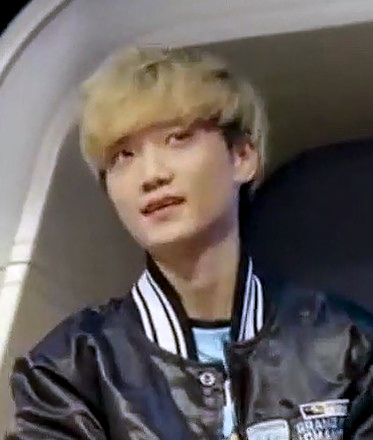
DPS Profit (left) and Birdring (right)

Cloud9 was awarded the London slot for an OWL franchise on August 10, 2017, and was later named the London Spitfire. Shortly afterwards, they disclosed their 12-player inaugural season roster, the maximum permitted, which would be entirely composed of South Korean players. The roster would mainly be an amalgamation of their current Cloud9 KONGDOO core and OGN's Overwatch APEX Season 4 champions GC Busan.

London started the season with a win to the a 3–1 victory over the Florida Mayhem and continued that winning trend through their first five games, resulting in the team's best win streak of the 2018 regular season. They would end Stage 1 of the 2018 Season with a 7–3 record, earning them the third and final spot in the Stage 1 Playoffs. The team then became the first-ever stage playoffs champions, after achieving victories over the Houston Outlaws (3–1) and the New York Excelsior (3–2) in a reverse sweep. On March 7, midway through Stage 2, the Spitfire parted ways with head coach Lee "Bishop" Beom-joon for undisclosed reasons. The team finished Stage 2 with an improved 8–2 record and attained another stage playoffs berth. However, they fell short to the Philadelphia Fusion in a 2–3 semi-finals series. As the season progressed, the Spitfire experienced a slight dip in form during Stages 3 and 4, resulting in a combined record of 9–11. Despite this relative downturn, the team's performance during the first half of the season secured their berth in the season playoffs as the fifth seed.

London lost their first postseason matchup against the Gladiators on July 11 by a score of 0–3 in the quarterfinals. The Spitfire turned it around the next two games against the Gladiators, winning in 3–0 sweeps in matches two and three and advancing the team to the semifinals. London won both games against the Los Angeles Valiant in the semifinals, winning 3–0 in match one and 3–1 in match two.

=== Philadelphia Fusion ===
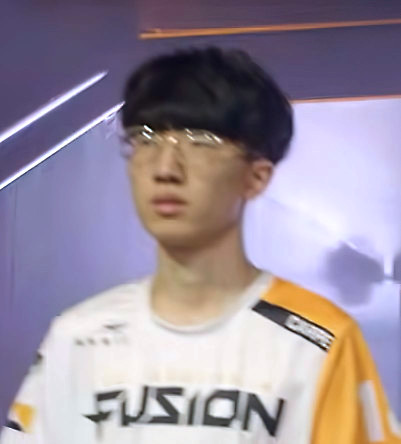
DPS Carpe

On September 20, 2017, Overwatch developer Activision Blizzard officially announced that Philadelphia Flyers owner Comcast Spectacor had acquired the rights to the Philadelphia-based Overwatch League franchise; later the team name was revealed as the Philadelphia Fusion. Shortly afterwards on November 3, their roster was revealed.

Philadelphia's first regular season OWL match was a 3–2 victory against the Houston Outlaws on January 11. On January 25, Philadelphia upset the undefeated New York Excelsior, which marked New York's only loss in Stage 1. With a lack of preparation time heading into the regular season, the team struggled for form in Stage 1 and would only manage to notch six victories, missing the Stage 1 Playoffs. Using the stage-break to catch up on lost practice time and welcoming the arrival of Israeli DPS player Josue "Eqo" Corana, Stage 2 would prove to be a turning point for the team. After opening up the stage with back-to-back sweeps over the Boston Uprising and Florida Mayhem, the team would continue to impress and go on to achieve a much improved 3rd-place finish – good enough for a stage playoffs berth. During the Stage 2 Playoffs, the team surprised many after defeating heavily favored Stage 1 champions London Spitfire in the semi-finals, however a finals match-up with the New York Excelsior would prove a juggernaut too much as the Fusion would fall short in a hard-fought 5-map match. Heading into the final match of Stage 3 on May 5, the Fusion needed a win over the Los Angeles Valiant for a shot to claim the 4th seed in the Stage 3 playoff bracket. However, the Valiant proved too much to handle, as they defeated the Fusion by a score of 3–2 and claimed the 4th seed for their own. After Dallas Fuel's upset 3–1 win over the Los Angeles Valiant on June 15, Philadelphia needed a 4–0 sweep over the London Spitfire in order to make the Stage 4 Playoffs. While the Fusion were victorious in that matchup, they were only able to win by a score of 3–1 and subsequently, missed the Stage 4 Playoffs. Philadelphia Fusion claimed the 6th seed in the Season Playoffs on June 15, after Seoul Dynasty lost to the Los Angeles Gladiators.

Fusion defeated third-seeded Boston Uprising in the quarterfinals by two matches to one. The team went on to face the top-seeded New York Excelsior in the semifinals, a game the Fusion were considered heavy underdogs. Philadelphia dominated New York in the first match, winning three maps to zero, and took the second match by three maps to two.

=== Summary of results ===
Qualified playoffs teams
Seed	Team	Division	Record	MR	MD
1	New York Excelsior	ATL	34–6	126–43–4	+83
2	Los Angeles Valiant	PAC	27–13	100–64–7	+36
3	Boston Uprising	ATL	26–14	99–71–3	+28
4	Los Angeles Gladiators	PAC	25–15	96–72–3	+24
5	London Spitfire	ATL	24–16	102–69–3	+33
6	Philadelphia Fusion	ATL	24–16	93–80–2	+13

Quarterfinals
Team	Match 1	Match 2	Match 3	Match Wins
(6) Philadelphia Fusion	3	1	3	2
(3) Boston Uprising	1	3	1	1

Semifinals
Team	Match 1	Match 2	Match 3	Match Wins
(6) Philadelphia Fusion	3	3	–	2
(1) New York Excelsior	0	2	–	0

Quarterfinals
Team	Match 1	Match 2	Match 3	Match Wins
(5) London Spitfire	0	3	3	2
(4) Los Angeles Gladiators	3	0	0	1

Semifinals
Team	Match 1	Match 2	Match 3	Match Wins
(5) London Spitfire	3	3	–	2
(2) Los Angeles Valiant	1	0	–	0

== Venue and ticketing ==
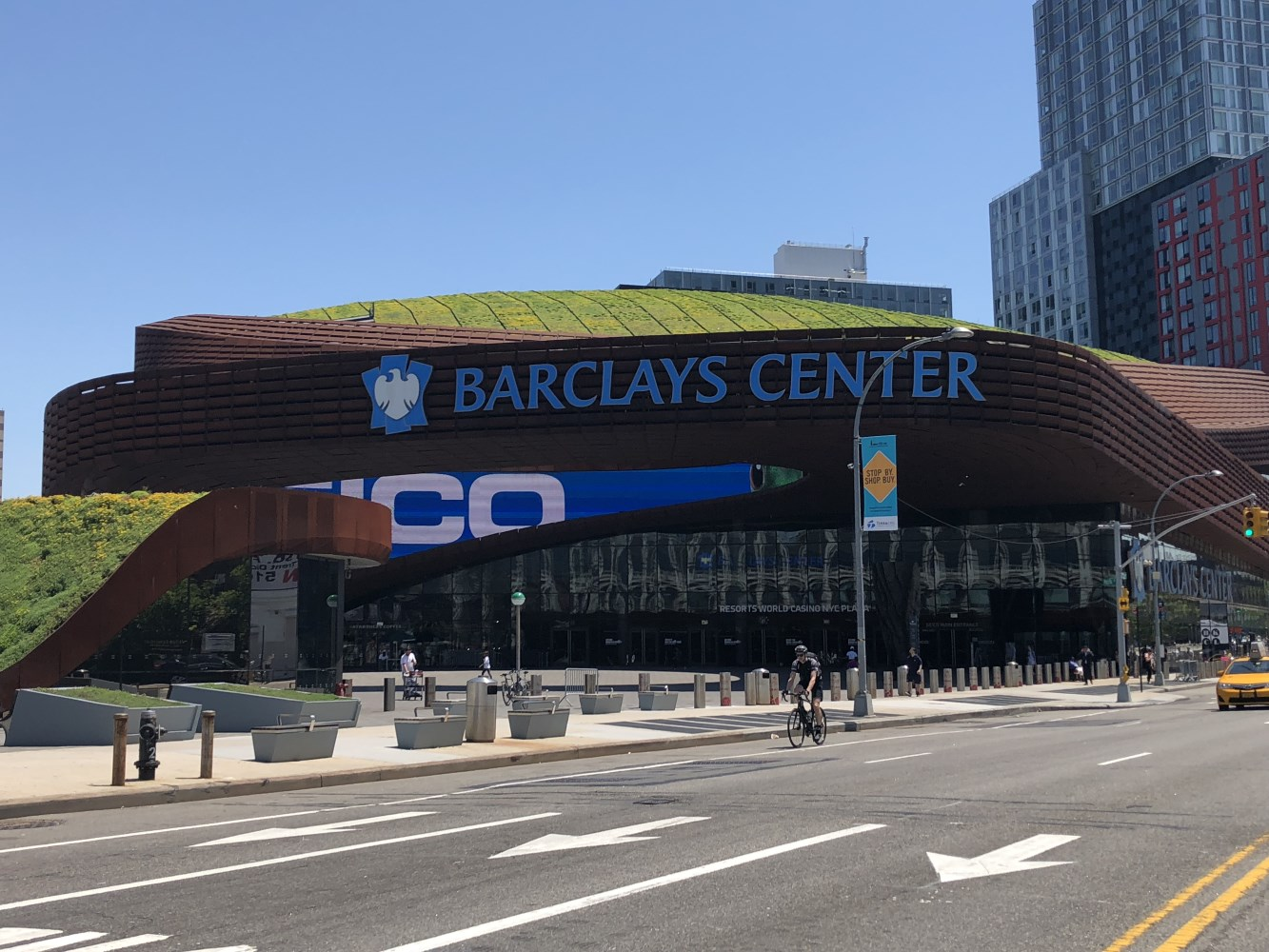
Barclays Center, the host venue of the 2018 OWL Grand Finals

The Barclays Center in New York was selected as the 2018 OWL Grand Finals host venue on May 9, 2018. Overwatch League commissioner Nate Nanzer emphasized that two factors influenced the decision to select the Barclays Center as the grand finals host: the venue's location in a prominent global city and its world-class status. Nanzer also acknowledged the fervent fanbase of the New York Excelsior (NYXL), stating that the support from NYXL fans played a role in selecting New York as the host city. Opened in 2012, the $1 billion stadium has a capacity of about 19,000 and is used by the Brooklyn Nets of the National Basketball Association (NBA) and the New York Islanders of the National Hockey League (NHL). The arena has also hosted concerts, conventions and other sporting and entertainment events, including the 2013 NBA draft, the 2015 NBA All-Star Weekend, the 2016 NCAA Men's Division I Basketball Tournament, UFC 223, and the 2013 MTV Video Music Awards.

Ticket sales for the finals began on May 18, 2018. Two-day general admission tickets sold for $60. Fans also had the option to upgrade their packages. The "Grandmaster" package, priced at $75, and the "Master" package, priced at $40, offered exclusive perks, including the chance to take photos with Overwatch League players, attend meet-and-greets with players, and receive Overwatch League merchandise, or "swag". Within a few hours of being on sale, the Grandmaster package upgrades were entirely sold out, leaving only the General Admission tickets and the Master package upgrades. The remaining tickets for the event sold-out exactly two weeks later, leaving resell tickets in excess of $125.

== Broadcast and viewership ==
On the first day of the season playoffs, Disney and Blizzard announced a multi-year partnership that would bring the league and other professional Overwatch competitive events to ESPN, Disney XD, and ABC, starting with the playoffs and throughout all of the following season. The partnership marked the time that a live esports competition had aired on ESPN in prime time and the first time that an esports competition had aired on ABC.

The Nielsen ratings for the Grand Finals broadcasts on ESPN and ABC were relatively low compared to other programs that aired in similar time slots. The full Friday broadcast on ESPN received a 0.18 rating, while a later ESPN2 re-airing of digital coverage managed a 0.05 rating. ABC's Sunday afternoon recap achieved a 0.3 rating. These ratings, when translated into household estimates, indicated the viewership numbers as 215,280 households for the Friday broadcast on ESPN, 59,800 households for the Saturday re-airing on ESPN2, and 358,800 households for Sunday's recap on ABC. However, Nielsen estimates are based on television-owning households in the United States and don not provide a comprehensive view of viewership patterns. Additionally, comparing Nielsen ratings to concurrent viewers on platforms like Twitch, where Overwatch League's grand finals broadcasts garnered between 150,000 and 350,000 concurrent viewers, can be challenging as households and viewers are not equivalent.

According to a press release from Blizzard, the Overwatch League Grand Finals achieved a global viewership of 10.8 million across the two days. This number was attained through a combination of officially partnered streaming platforms, including Twitch, ESPN, MLG, and Chinese partners ZhanQi TV, NetEase CC, and Panda TV. The Finals were also aired on South Korea's MBC network with a slight delay. Among all of these platforms, the average minute audience was reported to be 861,205 over both days. Blizzard reported that the United States accounted for 289,175 of the average minute viewers, encompassing both the Twitch stream and the ESPN broadcast. The remaining substantial portion of the audience hailed from international markets, with the Chinese market likely playing a significant role. Chinese streaming numbers can be intricate due to challenges such as botting, which involves creating fake users to inflate viewer numbers, and differences in metrics used by various websites to calculate the number of viewers.

Telecast schedule
Date	Time (EDT)	Event	Network(s)
Fri, July 27	7:00 p.m.	Day 1 of Grand Finals	ESPN
Sat, July 28	4:30 p.m.	Day 2 of Grand Finals	Disney XD, ESPN3
Sat, July 28	9:00 p.m.	Day 2 of Grand Finals	ESPN2 (re-air)
Sun, July 29	3:00 p.m.	Highlights Recap	ABC, ESPN3

== Entertainment ==
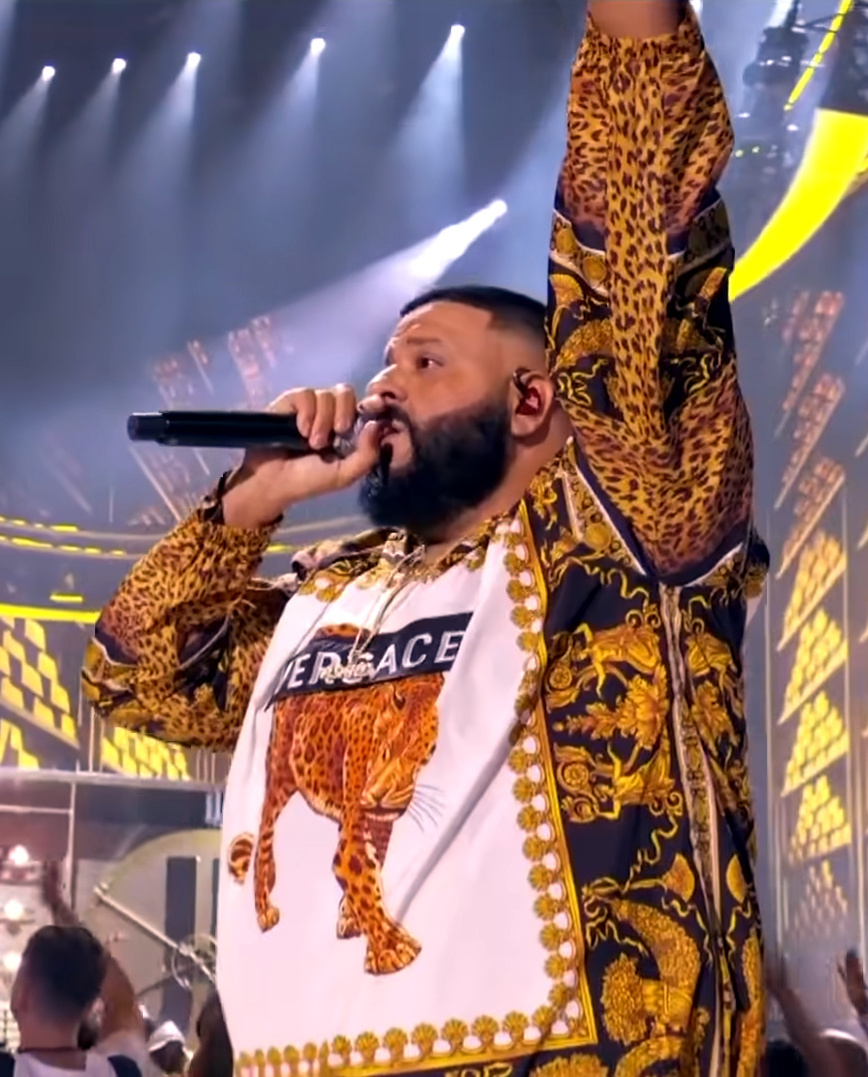
DJ Khaled

The 2018 Overwatch League Grand Finals featured a lineup of entertainment performances. David Garibaldi, an artist known for his Speed painting abilities, created his own take on the Overwatch League logo. Blizzard said that one fan would have the opportunity to receive the artwork as a special memento. DJ Mick entertained the audience on Friday during breaks in the broadcast. Meanwhile, DJ Envy opened for DJ Khaled and performed during breaks on Saturday.

On July 25, 2018, the Overwatch League announced that the Grand Finals would be opening with a live performance from DJ Khaled. However, the decision to have DJ Khaled as the opening act received mixed reactions from the online community. A notable point of contention surrounding DJ Khaled's performance stemmed from his past remarks, which were deemed sexist in nature. In an interview, he made statements suggesting that he expects certain actions from his wife, which he himself may not reciprocate. This led to criticism and backlash from some members of the public. Overwatch League host Malik Forté also expressed his thoughts on the artist choice on Twitter, emphasizing the importance of mutual respect and equal treatment within relationships. Past BlizzCon events had successfully featured artists like Weird Al Yankovic and Muse, prompting some to suggest that the League could have considered alternative artists from the area who had not been involved in similar controversies.

He performed live at the Barclays Center on July 28, prior to the first match of the second day. The performance was streamed live exclusively on Twitch. During his performance, DJ Khaled made several attempts to engage the audience by encouraging them to sing along to his songs. However, it became evident that the crowd was not familiar with the lyrics, resulting in awkward moments of deafening silence. Despite the challenges, DJ Khaled continued with his performance, incorporating DJ medleys and additional vocals. Twitter users were quick to respond to the performance, with many offering humorous takes on the situation. While DJ Khaled demonstrated professionalism by completing the entire 15-minute performance, the overall reception was mixed, with some viewers questioning whether he was the most suitable choice for the Overwatch League event. The performance sparked discussions within the Overwatch community about music preferences and the choice of DJ Khaled as the opening act. Tatjana Vejnovic of Overwatch Wire described the performance as "the worst one [she's] ever witnessed... the performance should be categorized as a disaster."

== Match summaries ==
=== Match one ===
Grand Finals Match 1	July 27	Philadelphia Fusion	1	–	3	London Spitfire	Brooklyn, NY
	7:00 pm EST	Details					Barclays Center
		3	Dorado			2	
		0	Oasis			2	
		1	Eichenwalde			2	
		1	Volskaya Industries			2	

==== Map 1: Dorado ====
PHI	Escort map	LDN
3	Checkpoints	2
85.78 m	Distance	82.66 m
0:00	Time remaining	0:00

	Lineup
EQO	Damage role	birdring
Carpe	Damage role	Profit
SADO	Tank role	Gesture
HOTBA	Tank role	Fury
Boombox	Support role	Bdosin
neptuNo	Support role	NUS

The 2018 Overwatch League Grand Finals commenced with the escort map Dorado. At the beginning of the match, the Philadelphia Fusion, who had a 70% win rate on the map, advanced a payload through the map with ease. Led by Sado, who was playing as Reinhardt, they charged forward aggressively. On the other hand, the London Spitfire appeared somewhat unsettled and unprepared. Throughout the match, several players made uncharacteristic errors. As the game progressed, however, the Spitfire gradually regained their composure and began performing more steadily. The Philadelphia Fusion capitalized on the Spitfire's overaggressive positioning around the payload. Key plays by their players, such as Eqo on Hanzo and Carpe on Widowmaker, allowed them to gain ground effectively. Eqo's precise arrow shots and Carpe's eliminations of enemy players supported their team's dominance. As the match transitioned to the map's interior areas, the London Spitfire's defense improved notably. Birdring's Genji play and Fury's performance as D.Va made it harder for the Fusion to make further progress. However, Fusion's Hotba utilized D.Va's "self-destruct" ability, eliminating Gesture, a key player from the Spitfire team, and creating an advantageous opportunity for the Fusion. They capitalized on this advantage, overpowering the Spitfire and securing a 3–0 map lead.

As the London Spitfire transitioned to their attack phase, they appeared entirely undeterred by the previous defensive collapse. The Spitfire exhibited an impressive start, and at one point, it seemed likely that they would achieve a full payload capture with four minutes left on the clock. As the payload reached its final destination inside the building at the end of Dorado, the Philadelphia Fusion seemed to awaken to the urgency of the situation. With just meters remaining for the payload to reach its final destination and nearly three minutes on the clock, the Spitfire encountered a formidable obstacle against the Fusion's defense, led by Eqo on Hanzo and Carpe on Widowmaker. These two snipers consistently inflicted substantial damage on the attacking Spitfire, causing considerable disruption to their progress. In combination with the effective coordination of Hotba on D.Va and Sado on Winston, who provided crucial cleanup support, the Fusion managed to hold their ground and turn the tables on the Spitfire. Despite the Spitfire's earlier dominance, the tide shifted drastically, and the Philadelphia Fusion turned the situation in their favor. They held firm against London's efforts and repelled the attack, securing at victory from what appeared to be an impending defeat.

==== Map 2: Oasis ====
PHI	Control map	LDN
47%	Round 1	100%
41%	Round 2	100%

	Lineup
EQO	Damage role	birdring
Carpe	Damage role	Profit
SADO	Tank role	Gesture
HOTBA	Tank role	Fury
Boombox	Support role	Bdosin
neptuNo	Support role	NUS

During the second map, Oasis, the London Spitfire maintained their aggressive momentum, reminiscent of their performance at the beginning of Dorado. The Spitfire swiftly secured control of the capture area, establishing a dominant offensive presence, led by Fury's Roadhog and Birdring's Hanzo. The Philadelphia Fusion initially appeared somewhat shaken by the Spitfire's assertive playstyle but managed to regain composure. They found success by relying on Eqo's Pharah play and Sado's performance as a tank. Through coordinated efforts, the Fusion were able to capture the point and secure approximately 49% control. Despite the Fusion's efforts, the Spitfire showcased resilient defense, preventing the Fusion from gaining further control, and won the round.

The Philadelphia Fusion adjusted their strategy to a more balanced team composition after their initial approach failed. This change allowed Carpe to showcase his skills as Tracer. Philadelphia managed to secure control of the point and gained 41% of control before the London Spitfire mounted a comeback. Led by Gesture and Bdosin, who played Zenyatta, the Spitfire took charge and successfully cleared out most of the Philadelphia damage heroes, seizing control of the point for themselves. Birdring's performance across multiple heroes was pivotal in the Spitfire's success on Oasis. His 15 eliminations to only 2 deaths showcased his effectiveness in working with the frontline to control Carpe's Widowmaker and limit his impact on the match. Despite a brief scare, the Spitfire outlasted the Fusion and secured a convincing victory, resulting in a 1–1 tie as they headed into halftime.

==== Map 3: Eichenwalde ====
PHI	Hybrid map	LDN
1	Checkpoints	1
77.65 m	Distance	77.65 m
0:00	Time remaining	1:21

	Lineup
EQO	Damage role	birdring
Carpe	Damage role	Profit
SADO	Tank role	Gesture
HOTBA	Tank role	Fury
Poko	Tank role Support role	Bdosin
neptuNo	Support role	NUS

Coming out of the half-time break and into the third map of the night, hybrid map Eichenwalde, the Fusion subbed-in tank player Gael "Poko" Gouzerch for Isaac "Boombox" Charles. Philadelphia managed to regain momentum by swiftly capturing the opening point. However, after the initial capture and a brief push of the payload, the London Spitfire regrouped and took advantage of Philadelphia's challenging choke point position on the map. Leveraging the map's topography, the Spitfire effectively stalled and wasted valuable time from the Fusion's clock. As the clock dwindled down to about a minute, the Fusion finally began moving the payload, progressing it towards the bridge of Eichenwalde. Nonetheless, the Spitfire's tank line, particularly Gesture's Winston, dominated the remainder of the match and halted Philadelphia's progress along the way.

The London Spitfire encountered difficulties when it was their turn to attack. For nearly three minutes, they struggled to make any significant progress against the defense of the Philadelphia Fusion. However, with about 50 seconds remaining, the Spitfire executed a decisive push and successfully captured the point, thanks in part to Gesture's performance on Winston, which proved instrumental once again. Although the Philadelphia Fusion had a strong start, they faced a swift breakdown in their defense. Bdosin's Tracer, who had been a constant threat throughout the match, secured crucial eliminations for the Spitfire during their payload push, propelling them to victory. As a result of the Spitfire's successful attack and capture of the point, they took the map victory, securing a 2–1 lead in the series.

==== Map 4: Volskaya Industries ====
PHI	Assault map	LDN
1	Checkpoints	1
57.1%	Capture progress	57.2%
0:00	Time remaining	0:07

	Lineup
EQO	Damage role	birdring
Carpe	Damage role	Profit
SADO	Tank role	Gesture
HOTBA	Tank role	Fury
Poko	Tank role Support role	Bdosin
neptuNo	Support role	NUS

The fourth, and final, map of the night was the assault map Volskaya Industries. Needing a win to save the series, the Philadelphia Fusion encountered initial challenges, struggling to make significant progress on the opening point against the defense of the Spitfire. Despite the tough start, the Fusion found a glimmer of hope when a few careless mistakes by the Spitfire players allowed Poko on D.Va and Eqo on Zarya to execute a near team kill. This play enabled the Fusion to seize control of the opening point with approximately one minute remaining. Although the Fusion capitalized on this opportunity, they faced a different story when it came to Point B. After initially capturing half of the point, they found themselves at a loss against the Spitfire, particularly against Profit's play as Mei. The Spitfire's solid defense prevailed, thwarting the Fusion's efforts to complete the map.

On the attacking side, the Spitfire faced an equally slow start due to a formidable defensive effort from the Fusion. Unconventional in their approach, the Fusion adopted a more aggressive defensive style, led by Hotba on Roadhog, which proved highly successful in nearly fully holding London off the point. Despite facing a tight situation and limited time on the clock, the Spitfire secured a crucial elimination on Mercy, shifting the momentum in their favor and capturing Point A. The ensuing gameplay witnessed a tense back-and-forth exchange. However, in the closing moments, Profit swapped to Tracer and picked up five critical final blows in a span of 93 seconds, and the Spitfire captured Point B, securing the victory in the series.

=== Match two ===
Grand Finals Match 2	July 28	Philadelphia Fusion	0	–	3	London Spitfire	Brooklyn, NY
	4:00 pm EST	Details					Barclays Center
		2	Junkertown			3	
		0	Lijang Tower			2	
		3	King's Row			4	

==== Map 1: Junkertown ====
PHI	Escort map	LDN
2	Checkpoints	2
61.67 m	Distance	61.68 m
0:00	Time remaining	3:09

	Lineup
EQO	Damage role	birdring
Carpe	Damage role	Profit
SADO	Tank role	Gesture
Poko	Tank role	Fury
Boombox	Support role	Bdosin
neptuNo	Support role	NUS

Escort map Junkertown was the first map of the night, and Philadelphia was the first to attack. The Fusion launched their offense with a Bastion composition, effectively shielded for a powerful push. While the London Spitfire put up a fight, the Fusion managed to advance swiftly through the first two sections of the map. However, as they entered the last third of the map, the Fusion was shut down. With less than two minutes remaining, Profit's Hanzo, combined with Gesture's well-timed halt ability as Orisa, unleashed a Dragonstrike that eliminated four members of the Philadelphia Fusion, effectively halting their advance.

On London's attack, Gesture on Orisa and Bdosin on Roadhog consistently combined their abilities to create a force that proved challenging for the Philadelphia Fusion to defend against. Despite the Fusion's efforts, Poko, who started as the flex tank in place of Hotba, continued to impress with his performance. Poko executed a three-kill D.Va bomb, successfully slowing down the Spitfire's advance towards the second point. However, the London Spitfire displayed relentless determination, and their coordinated play proved overwhelming. They decisively rolled over the Philadelphia Fusion, securing a 3-2 map victory and establishing a 1–0 lead in the series after Map 1.

==== Map 2: Lijiang Tower ====
PHI	Control map	LDN
0%	Round 1	100%
38%	Round 2	100%

	Lineup
EQO	Damage role	birdring
Carpe	Damage role	Profit
SADO	Tank role	Gesture
Poko	Tank role	Fury
Boombox	Support role	Bdosin
neptuNo	Support role	NUS

The second map of the night was Lijiang Tower. On the first sub-map, Night Market, the Spitfire completely dismantled the Fusion, strategically forcing them into vulnerable positions and capitalizing on those opportunities to pick off their opponents. London executed their game plan flawlessly, preventing the Fusion from gaining a single percentage on Night Market, resulting in a decisive victory for the Spitfire.

Moving on to the second sub-map, Garden, the Spitfire continued their aggressive playstyle. Although the Fusion managed to gain a foothold on the objective, While the Fusion managed to establish a foothold on the point, Carpe's exceptional Widowmaker play proved instrumental as he battled against Gesture's Winston, landing crucial headshots. Despite Carpe's efforts, the Spitfire had already amassed an overwhelming 99% control. The Fusion managed to make a bit of a resurgence, reaching 38% control, but the Spitfire pushed the Philadelphia Fusion off the point and securing a resounding 2–0 victory on Lijiang Tower.

==== Map 3: King's Row ====
PHI	Hybrid map	LDN
3	Checkpoints	3
0.0%	Distance	33.3%
0:00	Time remaining	0:31

	Lineup
EQO	Damage role	birdring
Carpe	Damage role	Profit
snillo	Damage role Tank role	Gesture
HOTBA	Tank role	Fury
Boombox	Support role	Bdosin
neptuNo	Support role	NUS

The third, and final, map of the day was hybrid map King's Row. Philadelphia commenced their attack run against the London Spitfire with both teams opting for a single support composition. Boombox and Bdosin played Roadhog, while neptuNo and Nus assumed the role of Mercy. The Fusion swiftly secured Point A after Carpe's Widowmaker landed critical headshots, but they encountered some difficulties on Point B. As the payload advanced through the streets of King's Row, Profit's Junkrat served as a constant annoyance as a flanker. Additionally, Bdosin's aggressive Zenyatta play added further pressure to the Fusion, as he executed his own flanks. Despite the Spitfire's attempts to impede their push, the Fusion kept the momentum alive through the second checkpoint with 1:30 remaining on the clock. As the Fusion turned the corner, Neptuno moved in to resurrect Sado, but he was killed. Soon after, Fury used his Self Destruct to eliminate two more Fusion players. As London had no more ultimates, the Fusion were able to finish the map in overtime.

It was then the London Spitfire's turn to attack, they struggled to capture the first point. With just under two minutes remaining, the Spitfire transitioned to a triple-tank, triple-support composition and captured Point A. The composition featured Reinhardt and Brigitte, which lacked mobility and resurrection capabilities, forcing the Spitfire to reset. With Gesture's Earthshatter, London managed to advance the payload to Point B with 2:18 remaining to complete the map. The Spitfire completed King's Row with 1:10 left on the clock.

Since London was the only team to finish their attack run with time remaining on the clock, they were granted another chance to attack. With only one tick needed on Point A to secure victory, the Spitfire swiftly capitalized on their advantage. London wasted no time and quickly gained control, effectively boxing out the Fusion and securing the crucial first elimination. Within seconds, the Spitfire won the map.

== Team rosters ==
=== Philadelphia Fusion ===
2018 Philadelphia Fusion roster
Players
Coaches

Role	No.	Handle	Name	Nationality
Damage	3	snillo	Ekström, Simon	Sweden
Damage	13	ShaDowBurn	Gushcha, Georgii	Russia
Damage	15	Eqo	Corona, Josue	Israel
Damage	18	Carpe	Lee Jae-hyeok	South Korea
Tank	9	SADO	Kim Su-min	South Korea
Tank	54	Fragi	Laine, Joona	Finland
Support	8	neptuNo	González, Alberto	Spain
Support	10	DayFly	Park Jeong-hwan	South Korea
Support	23	Joemeister	Gramano, Joseph	Canada
Support	42	Boombox	Charles, Isaac	England
Flex	7	HOTBA	Choi Hong-jun	South Korea
Flex	21	Poko	Gouzerch, Gael	France

Head coach

- Yann Luu

Legend:
- (I) Inactive
- (S) Suspended
- (2W) Two-way player
- Substitute
- (injured) Injury / Illness

Latest roster transaction: November 3, 2017.

=== London Spitfire ===
2018 London Spitfire roster
Players
Coaches

Role	No.	Handle	Name	Nationality
Damage	13	Profit	Park Jun-yeung	South Korea
Damage	20	birdring	Kim Ji-hyeok	South Korea
Tank	7	Gesture	Hong Jae-hee	South Korea
Support	4	Closer	Jung Won-sik	South Korea
Support	8	NUS	Kim Jong-seok	South Korea
Support	22	Bdosin	Choi Seung-tae	South Korea
Flex	19	Fury	Kim Jun-ho	South Korea

Head coach

- Vacant

Legend:
- (I) Inactive
- (S) Suspended
- (2W) Two-way player
- Substitute
- (injured) Injury / Illness

Latest roster transaction: June 18, 2018.
