= List of Los Angeles Valiant players =

Los Angeles Valiant is an American esports team founded in 2017 that competed in the Overwatch League (OWL). The Valiant began playing competitive Overwatch in the 2018 season.

All rostered players during the OWL season (including the playoffs) are included, even if they did not make an appearance.

== All-time roster ==
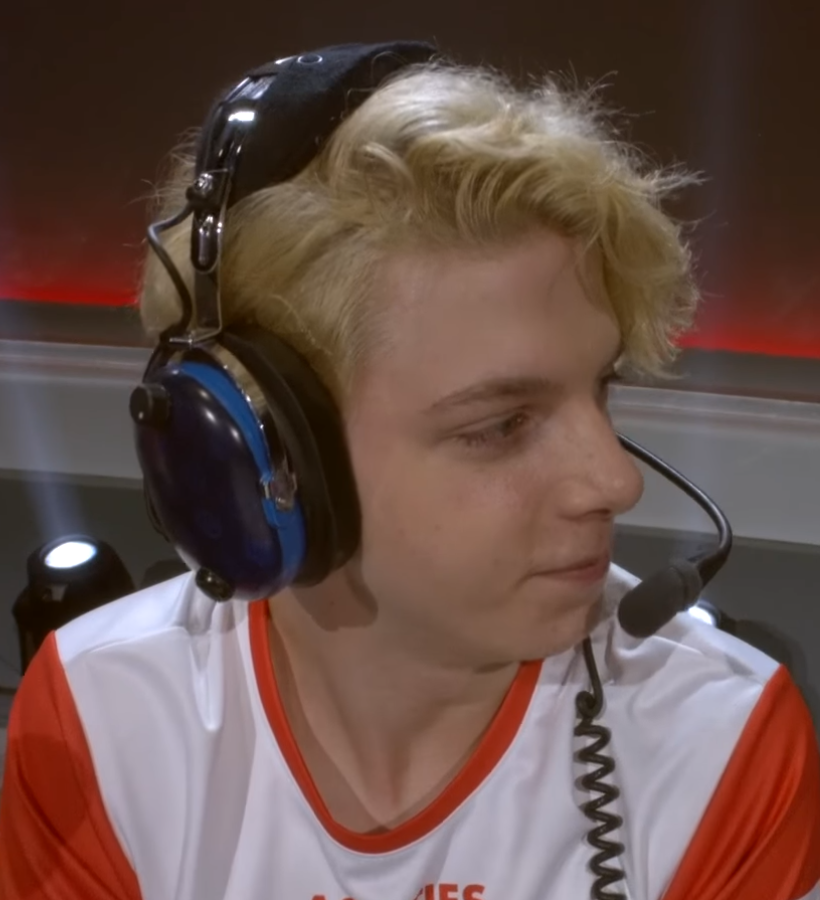
Brady "Agilities" Girardi.

As of December 15, 2021

Handle	Name	Role	Country	Seasons	Ref.
Agilities	Brady Girardi	Damage	Canada	2018–2019	
Apply	Damon Conti	Damage	United States	2020	
Bunny	Junhyeok Chae	Damage	South Korea	2018–2019	
Custa	Scott Kennedy	Support	Australia	2018–2019	
Diya	Weida Lu	Damage	China	2022–present	
Dreamer	Song Sang-lok	Tank	South Korea	2020	
envy	Kangjae Lee	Tank	South Korea	2018	
Fate	Panseung Koo	Tank	South Korea	2018–2019	
FCTFCTN	Russell Campbell	Tank	United States	2019	
Finnsi	Finnbjörn Jónasson	Tank	Iceland	2018	
GiG	Rick Salazar	Tank	United States	2020	
GrimReality	Christopher Schaefer	Damage	United States	2018	
Highbee	Zening Zhang	Support	China	2021	
Izayaki	Minchul Kim	Support	South Korea	2018–2019	
Kai	Kai Collins	Damage	United Kingdom	2020	
KariV	Youngseo Park	Support	South Korea	2018–2019	
Krystal	Shilong Cai	Damage	China	2021	
KSF	Kyle Frandanisa	Damage	United States	2018–2020	
KuKi	Daekuk Kim	Tank	South Korea	2019	
Lastro	Mun Jung-won	Support	South Korea	2020	
McGravy	Caleb McGarvey	Tank	United States	2019–2020	
MoLanran	Yang Liao	Damage	China	2021	
numlocked	Seb Barton	Tank	United Kingdom	2018	
NvM	Yelin Wen	Tank	China	2021	
RaiN	Park Jae-ho	Support	South Korea	2020	
Shax	Johannes Nielsen	Damage	Denmark	2019–2020	
ShowCheng	Yu Cheng	Tank	China	2021	
silkthread	Ted Wang	Damage	United States	2018	
Silver3	Haibo Han	Tank	China	2021	
Slur	Owen Warner	Support	Great Britain	2019-2020	
SoOn	Terence Tarlier	Damage	France	2018	
SPACE	Indy Halpern	Tank	United States	2018–2019	
uNKOE	Benjamin Chevasson	Support	France	2018	
Verbo	Stefano Disalvo	Support	Canada	2018	
Wya	Haomiao Qi	Support	China	2021	
