= 2018 Overwatch League playoffs =

2018 Overwatch League Playoffs

Tournament information
- Game: Overwatch
- Dates: July 11–July 28
- Administrator: Activision-Blizzard
- Venue: Blizzard Arena, Burbank, California
- Teams: 6
- Purse: $1,700,000

Tournament statistics
- Matches played: 12

Grand Finals
- Location: Brooklyn, New York
- Venue: Barclays Center
- Champion: London Spitfire
- Runner-up: Philadelphia Fusion
- Finals MVP: Park "Profit" Jun-young

The 2018 Overwatch League playoffs began on July 11, after the 2018 Overwatch League regular season ended, and concluded on July 28 with the 2018 Grand Finals, the first championship match of the Overwatch League (OWL). Six teams competed in the OWL Playoffs.

The winner of each round of the Playoffs was determined by a best-of-three match series, with match determined by best-of-five maps. The Quarterfinals had the third-seeded team playing the sixth-seeded team, while the fourth-seeded team played the fifth-seeded team. In the Semifinals, the top-seed team played the lowest remaining seed, while the second-seeded team played the next-lowest. The winners advanced to the Grand Finals, which took place at Barclays Center in Brooklyn, New York on July 27–28.

London Spitfire defeated Philadelphia Fusion in the Grand Finals to become the first Overwatch League Champions.

== Map pool and rotation ==
The postseason map pool consisted of eight maps, with a ninth map as the tie-breaking map (if necessary), and was decided by a lottery system on June 19.

	Map 1	Map 2	Map 3	Map 4	Map 5
Type	Escort	Control	Assault	Hybrid	Control
Pool	Eichenwalde	Hanamura	Lijiang Tower	Dorado	Nepal
Pool	King's Row	Volskaya Industries	Oasis	Junkertown	Nepal

== Participants ==
Six teams qualified for the Season Playoffs based on their season overall records. The two division leaders were awarded the top two seeds, and the following top four teams, regardless of division, were awarded seeds three through six.

Seed	Team	Division	Record	MR	MD
1	New York Excelsior	ATL	34–6	126–43–4	+83
2	Los Angeles Valiant	PAC	27–13	100–64–7	+36
3	Boston Uprising	ATL	26–14	99–71–3	+28
4	Los Angeles Gladiators	PAC	25–15	96–72–3	+24
5	London Spitfire	ATL	24–16	102–69–3	+33
6	Philadelphia Fusion	ATL	24–16	93–80–2	+13

=== Bracket ===
Quarterfinals; July 11–14, 2018
3	Boston Uprising	1	3	1	1
6	Philadelphia Fusion	3	1	3	2
4	Los Angeles Gladiators	3	0	0	1
5	London Spitfire	0	3	3	2

Semifinals; July 18–21, 2018
1	New York Excelsior	0	2	–	0
6	Philadelphia Fusion	3	3	–	2
2	Los Angeles Valiant	1	0	–	0
5	London Spitfire	3	3	–	2

Grand Finals; July 27–28, 2018
6	Philadelphia Fusion	1	0	–	0
5	London Spitfire	3	3	–	2

== Quarterfinals ==
=== (3) Boston Uprising vs. (6) Philadelphia Fusion ===
The Fusion pulled off a 2–1 victory in their first match against the Uprising, who had been high in the standings early in the regular season but had lost momentum in the latter half. Fusion used a tank-heavy roster, including Reinhardt played by Sado, which forced the Uprising to move away from their sniper-based strategy. Fusion's Eqo and Carpe also showed skill across several heroes to help with the victory.

Quarterfinals Match 1	July 11	Philadelphia Fusion	3	–	1	Boston Uprising	Burbank, CA
	5:00 pm PST	Details					Blizzard Arena
		3	Dorado			1	
		1	Oasis			2	
		5	Eichenwalde			4	
		2	Volskaya Industries			0	

Quarterfinals Match 2	July 13	Philadelphia Fusion	1	–	3	Boston Uprising	Burbank, CA
	5:00 pm PST	Details					Blizzard Arena
		4	Junkertown			5	
		0	Lijang Tower			2	
		3	King's Row			2	
		2	Hanamura			3	

Quarterfinals Match 3	July 13	Philadelphia Fusion	3	–	1	Boston Uprising	Burbank, CA
	7:00 pm PST	Details					Blizzard Arena
		2	Junkertown			3	
		2	Lijang Tower			0	
		3	Eichenwalde			1	
		2	Hanamura			1	

Philadelphia won series 2–1

=== (4) Los Angeles Gladiators vs. (5) London Spitfire ===
The Spitfire had been underdogs in their match against the Gladiators, having never won a regular season match against them. The Gladiators took the first match, 3–0, including a trick play that involved Surefour staying in the spawn room as a different hero until well into the match before changing to his regular Widowmaker hero and readily picking off the open Spitfire players. This was later known as "THE GREAT BAMBOOZLE". The Spitfire responded in the following matches with adaptive changes in their team composition that prevented the Gladiators from maintaining their defense lines. Notably, the Gladiators chose to bench their primary main tank player Fissure, who came second place for Season MVP, for the playoffs, opting instead to replace him with the team's other main tank player, iRemiix. The official reason given for this decision was that "the Gladiators believe that the most effective practice and preparation is necessary in order to perform well in playoffs."

Quarterfinals Match 1	July 11	London Spitfire	0	–	3	Los Angeles Gladiators	Burbank, CA
	7:00 pm PST	Details					Blizzard Arena
		2	Junkertown			3	
		1	Lijang Tower			2	
		1	King's Row			2	

Quarterfinals Match 2	July 14	London Spitfire	3	–	0	Los Angeles Gladiators	Burbank, CA
	1:00 pm PST	Details					Blizzard Arena
		2	Dorado			1	
		2	Oasis			0	
		3	Eichenwalde			0	

Quarterfinals Match 3	July 14	London Spitfire	3	–	0	Los Angeles Gladiators	Burbank, CA
	2:50 pm PST	Details					Blizzard Arena
		3	Junkertown			2	
		2	Lijang Tower			0	
		5	King's Row			4	

London won series 2–1

== Semifinals ==
After each quarterfinal series, the sixth-seeded Fusion, being the lowest seed of the two quarterfinals winners, faced the top-seeded Excelsior, whereas the fifth-seeded Spitfire played against the second-seeded Los Angeles Valiant. The semi-final saw upsets in both brackets with the lower-seed Fusion and Spitfire winning over the top seeds Excelsior and Valiant.

=== (1) New York Excelsior vs. (6) Philadelphia Fusion ===
Fusion had taken the first series 3–0 over Excelsior. While the second set ran for all five maps, Fusion won the series and the spot in the Grand Finals.

Semifinals Match 1	July 18	Philadelphia Fusion	3	–	0	New York Excelsior	Burbank, CA
	5:00 pm PST	Details					Blizzard Arena
		3	Dorado			2	
		2	Oasis			1	
		3	Eichenwalde			1	

Semifinals Match 2	July 21	Philadelphia Fusion	3	–	2	New York Excelsior	Burbank, CA
	4:00 pm PST	Details					Blizzard Arena
		3	Junkertown			2	
		1	Lijang Tower			2	
		3	King's Row			0	
		1	Hanamura			2	
		3	Dorado			2	

Philadelphia won series 2–0

=== (2) Los Angeles Valiant vs. (5) London Spitfire ===
The Spitfire had kept their traction from the victory over the Gladiators in the previous round, and took their spot in the finals after two matches, winning each 3–1 and 3–0.

Semifinals Match 1	July 18	London Spitfire	3	–	1	Los Angeles Valiant	Burbank, CA
	6:45 pm PST	Details					Blizzard Arena
		3	Junkertown			1	
		2	Lijang Tower			1	
		0	King's Row			1	
		1	Hanamura			1	
		3	Dorado			2	

Semifinals Match 2	July 20	London Spitfire	3	–	0	Los Angeles Valiant	Burbank, CA
	4:00 pm PST	Details					Blizzard Arena
		3	Dorado			2	
		2	Oasis			0	
		5	Eichenwalde			4	

London won series 2–0

== Grand Finals ==
The London Spitfire defeated the Philadelphia Fusion in the Grand Finals series in 2 sets. The Spitfire's Jun-Young "Profit" Park was named the Grand Finals Most Valuable Player; Profit was observed to be a key offensive player in the series, in one match using Hanzo's ultimate ability to eliminate five of the six Fusion players.

Grand Finals Match 1	July 27	Philadelphia Fusion	1	–	3	London Spitfire	Brooklyn, NY
	7:00 pm EST	Details					Barclays Center
		3	Dorado			2	
		0	Oasis			2	
		1	Eichenwalde			2	
		1	Volskaya Industries			2	

Grand Finals Match 2	July 28	Philadelphia Fusion	0	–	3	London Spitfire	Brooklyn, NY
	4:00 pm EST	Details					Barclays Center
		2	Junkertown			3	
		0	Lijang Tower			2	
		3	King's Row			4	

London won series 2–0

== Winnings ==
Teams in the Season Playoffs competed for a total prize pool of US$1.7 million, with the payout division detailed below.

Pos	Teams	Bonus
1	London Spitfire	$1,000,000
2	Philadelphia Fusion	$400,000
3	New York Excelsior	$100,000
4	Los Angeles Valiant	$100,000
5	Boston Uprising	$50,000
6	Los Angeles Gladiators	$50,000

== Broadcast and viewership ==
On the first day of the season playoffs, Disney and Blizzard announced a multi-year partnership that would bring the league and other professional Overwatch competitive events to ESPN, Disney XD, and ABC, starting with the playoffs and throughout all of the following season. The partnership marked the time that a live esports competition had aired on ESPN in prime time and the first time that an esports competition had aired on ABC. Nielsen ratings for the Grand Finals include a 0.18 rating (approximately 218,000 households) for the Friday match airing on ESPN, while the recap of the series airing on ABC on the Sunday after the event had a 0.3 rating (approximately 359,000 households). Blizzard estimated that over a million people were watching the Grand Finals at any time, between broadcast and streaming formats, with a total viewership of over 10.8 million.

=== Telecast schedule ===
Date	Time (EDT)	Event	Network(s)
Wed, July 11	8:00 p.m.	Day 1 of Quarterfinals	Disney XD, ESPN3
Fri, July 13	8:00 p.m.	Day 2 of Quarterfinals	Disney XD, ESPN3
Sat, July 14	4:00 p.m.	Day 3 of Quarterfinals	Disney XD, ESPN3
Wed, July 18	8:00 p.m.	Day 1 of Semifinals	Disney XD, ESPN3
Fri, July 20	7:00 p.m.	Day 2 of Semifinals	ESPNEWS
Sat, July 21	7:00 p.m.	Day 3 of Semifinals	ESPN2
Fri, July 27	7:00 p.m.	Day 1 of Grand Finals	ESPN
Sat, July 28	4:30 p.m.	Day 2 of Grand Finals	Disney XD, ESPN3
Sat, July 28	9:00 p.m.	Day 2 of Grand Finals	ESPN2 (re-air)
Sun, July 29	3:00 p.m.	Highlights Recap	ABC, ESPN3
