= London Spitfire =

British professional esports team

London Spitfires
- Founded: 9 March 2016
- League: Overwatch League
- Region: West
- Team history: Cloud9 (2016–2017); London Spitfire (2017–2023)
- Based in: London, England
- Colours
- Owner: Jack Etienne
- Head coach: Christopher "ChrisTFer" Graham
- General manager: Ysabel "Noukky" Müller
- Affiliation: British Hurricane
- Championships: 2018
- Main sponsor: Microsoft
- Website: Official website

Uniforms

London Spitfire was a professional Overwatch team based in London, England. The Spitfire competed in the Overwatch League (OWL) as a member of the league's West region. Founded in 2017, London Spitfire was one of the league's twelve founding members and was the only professional Overwatch team representing a European city. The team was owned by Jack Etienne and the esports organization Cloud9, who also owned British Hurricane, an academy team for the Spitfire that competed in Overwatch Contenders (OWC).

Lee "Bishop" Beom-joon was appointed the team's first head coach and guided London to claim the league's first stage championship in 2018. While the team parted ways with Bishop later that season, the team went on win the inaugural season Grand Finals.

== Franchise history ==
=== Team creation ===
Formed in March 2016, London Spitfire originally started out as the Overwatch branch of American esports organisation Cloud9. Under variations of the Cloud9 moniker, such as Cloud9 KONGDOO, they would go on to field rosters from multiple continents during their pre-OWL tenure.

On 10 August 2017, Activision Blizzard announced that Cloud9 had purchased the London Overwatch League franchise; the franchise would be the first and only European team heading into the inaugural season. Pete Vlastelica, an executive in Activision Blizzard's esports division, reported that several unnamed European companies were interested in purchasing the London rights to hold an Overwatch League franchise. Vlastelica noted, "Cloud9 may be a new name for some in the traditional sports world, but I can assure you they are not a niche or fringe player in esports. As we build this league, it was really important to us to combine the capabilities of owners from both traditional sports and the world of esports." Jack Etienne, chief executive Cloud9, paid roughly $20 million (£15.4 million) for the franchise slot. Etienne said that he chose the London slot because it was a "fantastic city with an amazing metro population [and] fantastic transportation to get people to events."

On 1 November, the team revealed they would be called London Spitfire. Shortly afterwards on 4 November, they disclosed their 12-player inaugural season roster, the maximum permitted, which would be entirely composed of South Korean players. The roster would mainly be an amalgamation of their current Cloud9 KONGDOO core and OGN's Overwatch APEX Season 4 champions GC Busan.

=== Inaugural season champions: 2018 ===
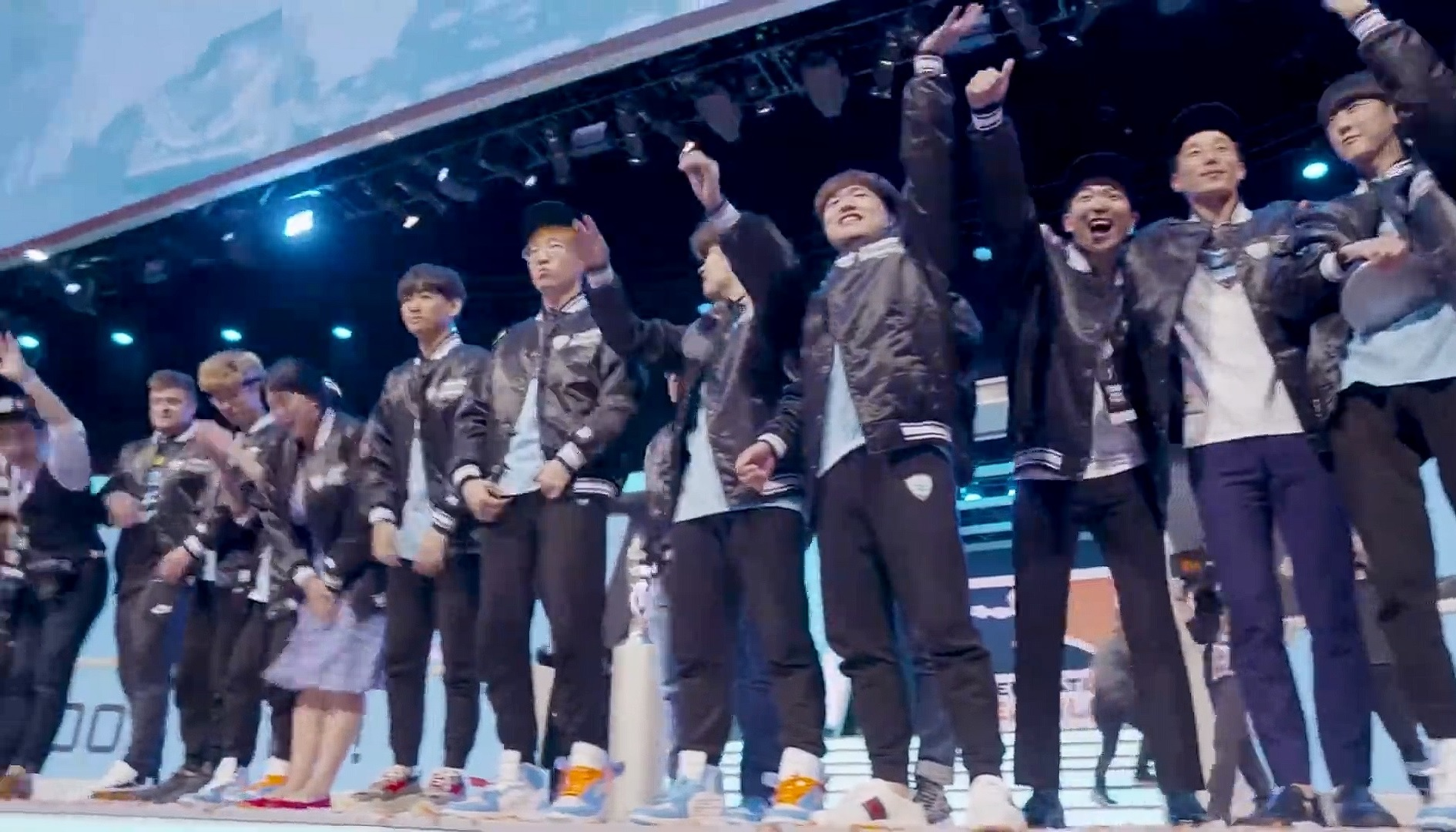
The London Spitfire won the 2018 Grand Finals.

On 11 January, the Spitfire played their first regular season Overwatch League match in a 3–1 victory over the Florida Mayhem. They would end Stage 1 of the 2018 Season with a 7–3 record, earning them the third and final spot in the Stage 1 Playoffs. The team then became the first-ever stage playoffs champions, after achieving victories over the Houston Outlaws, 3–1, and the New York Excelsior, 3–2. In March, midway through Stage 2, the Spitfire parted ways with head coach Lee "Bishop" Beom-joon for undisclosed reasons. The team finished Stage 2 with an improved 8–2 record and attained another stage playoffs berth. However, they fell short to the Philadelphia Fusion in a thrilling 2–3 semifinals series. However, after Stage 2, the Spitfire failed to make another stage playoffs, going 5–5 in Stage 3 and 4–6 in Stage 4. The team ended the season with a 24–16 record, good for 5th place and a spot in the postseason.

London lost their first postseason matchup against the Los Angeles Gladiators on 11 July by a score of 0–3, but the team turned it around the next two games against the Gladiators, winning in 3–0 sweeps in matches two and three and advancing the team to the semifinals. London won both games against the Los Angeles Valiant in the semifinals, winning 3–0 in match one and 3–1 in match two. London claimed the first Overwatch League championship after defeating the Philadelphia Fusion on 27 and 28 July by scores of 3–1 and 3–0, respectively.

=== Quest for a second title: 2019–2023 ===
The Spitfire filled their head coach vacancy in the 2019 offseason, signing Kim "Coach815" Kwangbok. London began their 2019 season winning only three of their matches in Stage 1. The stage ended with a 0–3 loss to the Seoul Dynasty in week 5, causing the team to miss out on the Stage 1 Playoffs. London found success in Stage 2, as the team posted a 6–1 record and qualified for the Stage 2 Playoffs; however, they were knocked out in the quarterfinals by the Hangzhou Spark after losing 1–3. The Spitfire parted ways with head coach Kwang-bok "Coach815" Kim in the middle of Stage 3, leaving the team without a head coach. A 0–4 loss to the Los Angeles Valiant in Stage 3 eliminated London from Stage 3 playoff contention as the team went on to post a 3–4 record for that stage. After a 4–3 win–loss record in Stage 4, London finished the regular season with a 16–12 record and qualified for the play-in tournament for a chance to make it to the 2019 season playoffs. London took down the Shanghai Dragons 4–3 in an OWL record eight-map series to qualify for the season playoffs. In the first round, London was defeated by the New York Excelsior, 1–4, sending the team to the lower bracket. A 0–4 loss to the San Francisco Shock ended the Spitfire's 2019 playoff run.

In the offseason preceding the 2020 season, the Spitfire overhauled their roster, releasing nearly all of their players from the 2019 season and signing mostly rookies. Additionally, the team promoted Hong "Agape" Cheol-yong as their head coach. While the team planned to play in the United Kingdom for live homestands, the team relocated its training facility to New Jersey to minimize travel time to other cities. However, after all live events were cancelled due to the COVID-19 pandemic, the Spitfire relocated to Seoul, South Korea, to compete in league's Asia region. London did not perform well in the 2020 season, finishing in 17th place in the overall standings.

During the 2020 offseason, the organization completely rebuilt its team, dropping its entire roster and coaching staff. Focusing on signing Western players and staff, London signed former Los Angeles Valiant coach Justin "Reprize" Hand as their new head coach. They signed a team consisting players mostly from their Overwatch Contenders academy team British Hurricane — a team that had won every European Overwatch Contenders title in 2020. The team also left South Korea to play remotely from the United States and Sweden to compete in the league's Western region. After an 0–8 start to the season, head coach Justin "Reprize" Hand retired; assistant coach Mads "fischer" Jehg became the new head coach of the team thereafter. London remained winless until their final match of the season, when they defeated the Vancouver Titans, to finish the season with a 1–15 record.

== Team identity ==
On 1 November 2017, the London Spitfire brand was officially unveiled. The name and shield-like logo were selected to pay homage to the British military plane Supermarine Spitfire, whose use during World War II by the Royal Air Force (RAF) reflected the spirit of bravery the team hoped to identify with. The team colours were also announced as blue and orange: blue inherited from parent organisation Cloud9, and orange in recognition of British Overwatch character Lena "Tracer" Oxton who was a former RAF pilot in the game's lore.

The team has never played in the United Kingdom. In the first two seasons of the league, the Spitfire played matches at the Blizzard Arena in Burbank, California along with all other Overwatch League teams. For 2020, the team planned to host two homestand events in the United Kingdom at Wembley Arena and the National Exhibition Centre, and the team relocated to New Jersey in order to reduce the distance between them and the large pool of North American teams. However, due to the COVID-19 pandemic, all live matches in the 2020 season were cancelled, and the league moved to exclusively online play. The Spitfire, along with the Vancouver Titans, relocated to Seoul, South Korea that year to increase the number of teams competing in the leagues Asian region. In 2021, their players and staff are playing and coaching remotely, with personnel situated in the United States and Europe.

== Sponsors ==
In March 2018, London signed a one-year sponsorship deal with Logitech G gaming products. The deal included equipment and gear supply, as well as the team hosting the Logitech G logo on their jerseys.

== Personnel ==
=== Current roster ===
London Spitfire roster
Players	Coaches
Role / No. / Handle / Name / Nationality	Head coach: Vacant
Legend: (I) Inactive; (S) Suspended; (2W) Two-way player; Substitute; (injured) Injury / Illness	Latest roster transaction: 30 October 2023.

=== Head coaches ===
Handle	Name	Seasons	Record	Notes	Ref.
Bishop	Beomjoon Lee	2018	10–4 (.714)	Released after 14 games in 2018.	
Coach815	Kwangbok Kim	2019	12–9 (.571)	Released after 21 games in 2019.	
Agape	Hong Cheol-yong	2020	6–15 (.286)		
reprize	Justin Hand	2021	0–8 (.000)	Released after eight games in 2021.	
fischer	Mads Jehg	2021	1–7 (.125)		
ChrisTFer	Christopher Graham	2022–2023	21–19 (.525)		

== Awards and records ==
=== Seasons overview ===
Season	P	W	L	W%	Finish	Playoffs
2018	40	24	16	.600	3rd, Atlantic	OWL Champions, 2–0 (Fusion)
2019	28	16	12	.571	3rd, Atlantic	Lost in Lower Round 1, 0–4 (Shock)
2020	21	6	15	.286	8th, Asia	Did not qualify
2021	16	1	15	.063	11th, West	Did not qualify
2022	24	14	10	.583	6th, West	Lost in Lower Round 3, 1–3 (Spark)
2023	16	7	9	.438	8th, West	Lost in Lower Final, 1–3 (Uprising)

=== Individual accomplishments ===
Grand Finals MVP

- Profit (Park Jun-young) – 2018

All-Star Game selections

- birdring (Kim Ji-hyeok) – 2018
- Bdosin (Choi Seung-tae) – 2018
- Fury (Kim Jun-ho) – 2018, 2019
- Gesture (Hong Jae-hui) – 2018, 2019
- Profit (Park Jun-young) – 2018, 2019
- Glister (Lim Gil-seong) – 2020

Other awards

- Hadi (Hadi Bleinagel) – Role Star, Dennis Hawelka Award, 2022
- ChrisTFer (Christopher Graham) – Coach of the Year, 2022

== Academy team ==
On 15 February 2018, the Spitfire formally announced that their academy team for Overwatch Contenders Europe would be called the British Hurricane, and revealed their all-European Season One squad. The team went to the first Atlantic Showdown, where they defeated Lowkey Esports before losing to Team Envy in the second round. They lost in the first round of the bottom half of the double-elimination bracket to ATL Academy, 3–0.
