= 2018 Overwatch League season =

- League: Overwatch League
- Sport: Overwatch
- Duration: January 10 – June 17; July 11 – 28 (Playoffs)
- Matches: 40
- Teams: 12
- TV partners: Global: Major League Gaming; Twitch; United States: ESPN; Disney XD; ABC (Playoffs); France: AB1

Regular season
- Season MVP: Bang "JJonak" Seong-hyun
- Top seed: New York Excelsior

Stage Champions
- Stage 1: London Spitfire
- Stage 2: New York Excelsior
- Stage 3: New York Excelsior
- Stage 4: Los Angeles Valiant

Grand Finals
- Venue: Barclays Center, Brooklyn, New York
- Champions: London Spitfire
- Runners-up: Philadelphia Fusion
- Finals MVP: Park "Profit" Joon-yeong

Overwatch League seasons
- 2019 →

The 2018 Overwatch League season was the inaugural season for the Overwatch League, an esports league based on the video game Overwatch which began on January 10, 2018. Regular season play continued through June 16, 2018, while post-season play ran from July 11–28, 2018. The London Spitfire won the Grand Finals over the Philadelphia Fusion to become the League champions, with the Spitfire's Park "Profit" Jun-young named the Finals MVP. An All-Star Weekend was held following the post-season from August 25–26, 2018.

== Schedule ==
The season's format and schedule were announced in November 2017. The inaugural regular season ran from January 10 to June 17, 2018, broken out into four stages. Each stage lasted five weeks, with a one-week break between each stages. Each regular season week featured twelve games, three matches per day from Wednesday to Saturday, with each team having played in two games that week. During stages one and two of season one, at the end of each stage, the top three teams across both divisions, based on their standings in that stage, played a final set of matches to win a US$100,000 prize with the runner-up taking a US$25,000 prize. As of season one stage three, four teams made each stage playoff. The #1 seed chose their opponent in the first round between the remaining three qualified teams. These matches are played on the final day of the stage.

The season's free agency signing window opened on January 22, 2018, and closed on April 3, 2018 (the start of Stage 3). During this period, teams could sign any eligible free agent player or make trades with other teams. Any player on a new team contract before the start of Stage 2 on February 21, 2018, was eligible to play during Stage 2. Otherwise, they had to wait until the start of Stage 3. After April 3, team rosters could not be changed until after the completion of the post-season games.

The post-season playoffs were held over three weeks in July 2018. It was a single-elimination playoff featuring 6 teams: each division leader, and the next top four teams from both divisions, with their position seeded by their standings. The Grand Finals were held on July 26 and 27, 2018.

All matches in the inaugural season (except for the Grand Finals) were played at the 350-seat Blizzard Arena, located on the former soundstage for The Tonight Show Starring Johnny Carson in Burbank, California. Games were broadcast on the Overwatch League's website and through Major League Gaming (owned by Blizzard), and by third-party broadcaster Twitch. The Grand Finals were played at Barclays Center in New York City, where all 11,000 seats available were sold out for both days of the event.

== Pre-season ==
Pre-season matches were held from December 6 to 8, 2017. Pre-season matches are exhibition only, and do not count towards the regular season standings. The Philadelphia Fusion had to pull out of pre-season play just before these events, citing "player logistics issues".

== Broadcast and viewership ==
The Overwatch League began the season with a two-year exclusive contract for Overwatch League broadcasting. Its debut week held an overall peak of 441,000 concurrent viewers on its three Twitch channels, with 392,000 English, 65,000 Korean, and 11,500 French viewers. Through the season, average online viewership ran between 80,000 and 170,000. At least 310,000 viewers watched the final match of the Grand Finals.

On the first day of the season playoffs, Disney and Blizzard announced a multi-year partnership that would bring the league and other professional Overwatch competitive events to ESPN, Disney XD, and ABC, starting with the playoffs and throughout all of the following season. Nielsen ratings for the Grand Finals include a 0.18 rating (approximately 218,000 households) for the Friday match airing on ESPN, while the recap of the series airing on ABC on the Sunday after the event had a 0.3 rating (approximately 359,000 households). Blizzard estimated that over a million people were watching the Grand Finals at any time, between broadcast and streaming formats, with a total viewership of over 10.8 million.

== Regular season ==
A team's standing is based on both their overall match win–loss record, with ties broken by their overall round record.

At the end of Stages 1 and 2, the top three teams overall in the current stage, regardless of division, made the stage playoffs. The first seeded team earned a bye, with the second and third seeded teams playing a best-of-5 series to advance to the stage finals. Beginning with Stage 3 of the 2018 season, Blizzard announced changes to the Stage Playoff format. Introduced was a four-team Stage playoffs going forward, so that both teams in the final match will have played the same number of games on that day. The first seed has the option of selecting their opponent for the first round and has home team advantage, with the remaining two teams assigned based on seed ranking. These stage playoffs have no effect on overall standings and are only for bonus prize money.

Teams' overall standings were used for placement in the post-season playoffs. The top team of each division received an automatic bye, while the next top four teams, regardless of division, filled in the remaining tournament slots.

=== Overall standings ===
Pos	Div	Team	Pld	W	L	PCT	MW	ML	MT	MD	Qualification
1	ATL	New York Excelsior	40	34	6	0.850	126	43	4	+83	Advance to season playoffs semifinals
2	PAC	Los Angeles Valiant	40	27	13	0.675	100	64	7	+36	Advance to season playoffs semifinals
3	ATL	Boston Uprising	40	26	14	0.650	99	71	3	+28	Advance to season playoffs quarterfinals
4	PAC	Los Angeles Gladiators	40	25	15	0.625	96	72	3	+24	Advance to season playoffs quarterfinals
5	ATL	London Spitfire	40	24	16	0.600	102	69	3	+33	Advance to season playoffs quarterfinals
6	ATL	Philadelphia Fusion	40	24	16	0.600	93	80	2	+13	Advance to season playoffs quarterfinals
7	ATL	Houston Outlaws	40	22	18	0.550	94	77	2	+17	
8	PAC	Seoul Dynasty	40	22	18	0.550	91	78	3	+13	
9	PAC	San Francisco Shock	40	17	23	0.425	77	84	5	−7	
10	PAC	Dallas Fuel	40	12	28	0.300	58	100	7	−42	
11	ATL	Florida Mayhem	40	7	33	0.175	42	120	5	−78	
12	PAC	Shanghai Dragons	40	0	40	0.000	21	141	2	−120	

Source: The Overwatch League
Rules for classification: 1) winning percentage; 2) map differential; 3) head-to-head map differential; 4) head-to-head record

=== Stage 1 ===
Stage 1 ran from January 10, 2018, to February 10, 2018, with Stage playoffs occurring on February 10, 2018.

==== Standings ====
Pos	Div	Team	Pld	W	L	PCT	MW	ML	MT	MD	Qualification
1	ATL	New York Excelsior	10	9	1	0.90	31	10	2	+21	Advance to stage finals
2	ATL	Houston Outlaws	10	7	3	0.70	30	13	0	+17	Advance to stage semifinals
3	ATL	London Spitfire	10	7	3	0.70	29	14	0	+15	Advance to stage semifinals
4	PAC	Los Angeles Valiant	10	7	3	0.70	26	13	3	+13	
5	PAC	Seoul Dynasty	10	7	3	0.70	25	16	2	+9	
6	ATL	Boston Uprising	10	6	4	0.60	27	17	0	+10	
7	ATL	Philadelphia Fusion	10	6	4	0.60	20	24	1	−4	
8	PAC	Los Angeles Gladiators	10	4	6	0.40	16	26	0	−10	
9	PAC	San Francisco Shock	10	3	7	0.30	16	24	2	−8	
10	PAC	Dallas Fuel	10	3	7	0.30	14	25	3	−11	
11	ATL	Florida Mayhem	10	1	9	0.10	9	31	1	−22	
12	PAC	Shanghai Dragons	10	0	10	0.00	6	36	0	−30	

Source: The Overwatch League
Rules for classification: 1) winning percentage; 2) map differential; 3) head-to-head map differential; 4) head-to-head record

==== Playoffs ====
With a league best 9–1 stage record, the New York Excelsior earned a bye directly into the stage finals. In the semifinal match, the Houston Outlaws took an early 1–0 lead over the London Spitfire, but were ultimately defeated 3–1. In the stage final, the New York Excelsior took a commanding 2–0 lead over the Spitfire, but New York could not secure their third match win. The London Spitfire completed a reverse sweep, winning the series 3–2 and their first stage title.

Stage Semifinals; Saturday, February 10, 2018			Stage Finals; Saturday, February 10, 2018
			1	New York Excelsior	2
2	Houston Outlaws	1	3	London Spitfire	3
3	London Spitfire	3

=== Stage 2 ===
Stage 2 ran from February 21 to March 24. Following Stage 1, Blizzard took input from players and fans and moved all future Stage playoff matches to Sunday, with Stage 2's playoffs taking place on March 25. This avoided a twelve-hour day of matches, which could see a team playing as many as three different matches in the same day. Stage two introduced the Overwatch patch that weakened Mercy's resurrection abilities, which outside of League play had caused her to be played less frequently.

==== Standings ====
Pos	Div	Team	Pld	W	L	PCT	MW	ML	MT	MD	Qualification
1	ATL	New York Excelsior	10	9	1	0.90	34	9	0	+25	Advance to stage finals
2	ATL	London Spitfire	10	8	2	0.80	31	11	0	+20	Advance to stage semifinals
3	ATL	Philadelphia Fusion	10	7	3	0.70	27	15	0	+12	Advance to stage semifinals
4	PAC	Seoul Dynasty	10	7	3	0.70	25	16	0	+9	
5	PAC	Los Angeles Gladiators	10	6	4	0.60	25	16	1	+9	
6	ATL	Boston Uprising	10	6	4	0.60	21	22	0	−1	
7	ATL	Houston Outlaws	10	5	5	0.50	22	22	0	0	
8	PAC	Los Angeles Valiant	10	4	6	0.40	18	23	1	−5	
9	PAC	San Francisco Shock	10	3	7	0.30	15	22	1	−7	
10	ATL	Florida Mayhem	10	3	7	0.30	15	27	1	−12	
11	PAC	Dallas Fuel	10	2	8	0.20	13	28	1	−15	
12	PAC	Shanghai Dragons	10	0	10	0.00	2	37	1	−35	

Source: The Overwatch League
Rules for classification: 1) winning percentage; 2) map differential; 3) head-to-head map differential; 4) head-to-head record

==== Playoffs ====
The New York Excelsior finished with the best stage record again, earning another bye into the stage finals. The semifinal match featured the London Spitfire, looking to repeat on their Stage 1 championship, against the Philadelphia Fusion. The Fusion won the series, 3–2.

In the finals, the Fusion took 2–0 lead over the Excelsior, though New York came back and completed a reverse sweep to win the series and their first stage title.

Stage Semifinals; Sunday, March 25, 2018			Stage Finals; Sunday, March 25, 2018
			1	New York Excelsior	3
2	London Spitfire	2	3	Philadelphia Fusion	2
3	Philadelphia Fusion	3

=== Stage 3 ===
Stage 3 ran from April 4 to May 5, with the stage playoffs occurring on May 6. This stage introduced a four-team stage playoffs format so both teams in the final match will have played the same number of games on that day. The first seed was given the option of selecting their opponent for the first round and received home team advantage, with the remaining two teams assigned based on seed ranking. Stage 3 introduced the Hybrid map "Blizzard World," which was released in November 2017, to the map pool. Stage 3 also introduced the patch that buffed Sombra's abilities, making her a more frequent component in winning team combinations.

==== Standings ====
Pos	Div	Team	Pld	W	L	PCT	MW	ML	MT	MD	Qualification
1	ATL	Boston Uprising	10	10	0	1.00	31	13	1	+18	Advance to stage playoffs
2	ATL	New York Excelsior	10	9	1	0.90	33	11	0	+22	Advance to stage playoffs
3	PAC	Los Angeles Valiant	10	7	3	0.70	28	15	1	+13	Advance to stage playoffs
4	PAC	Los Angeles Gladiators	10	6	4	0.60	25	19	1	+6	Advance to stage playoffs
5	PAC	San Francisco Shock	10	6	4	0.60	21	20	0	+1	
6	ATL	London Spitfire	10	5	5	0.50	24	21	1	+3	
7	ATL	Philadelphia Fusion	10	5	5	0.50	24	23	0	+1	
8	PAC	Seoul Dynasty	10	5	5	0.50	22	21	1	+1	
9	ATL	Houston Outlaws	10	4	6	0.40	20	24	1	−4	
10	ATL	Florida Mayhem	10	2	8	0.20	11	28	2	−17	
11	PAC	Dallas Fuel	10	1	9	0.10	9	30	2	−21	
12	PAC	Shanghai Dragons	10	0	10	0.00	9	32	0	−23	

Source: The Overwatch League
Rules for classification: 1) winning percentage; 2) map differential; 3) head-to-head map differential; 4) head-to-head record

==== Playoffs ====
Following the conclusion of Stage 3, the top seeded Boston Uprising became the first team in Overwatch League history to go undefeated in a stage. As the top seed, they earned the right to choose their first round opponent for the stage playoffs. They chose the fourth seed Los Angeles Gladiators, achieving a 3–0 match win. The second seed New York Excelsior also defeated the Los Angeles Valiant with a 3–0 win. The Excelsior won the final match over the Uprising in a 3–0 victory, marking their second stage championship win.

Stage Semifinals; Sunday, May 6, 2018
1	Boston Uprising	3
4	Los Angeles Gladiators	0
2	New York Excelsior	3
3	Los Angeles Valiant	0

Stage Finals; Sunday, May 6, 2018
1	Boston Uprising	0
2	New York Excelsior	3

=== Stage 4 ===
Stage 4 ran from May 16 to June 16, with the Stage playoffs occurring on June 17. Teams competed using the version of Overwatch which first introduced the support hero Brigitte, but prior to a patch that adjusted her strength and which introduced a revamped skill kit for Hanzo. The decision to play on the former patch was made due to a bug in the later patch that could not be fixed before the start of Stage 4.

==== Standings ====
Pos	Div	Team	Pld	W	L	PCT	MW	ML	MT	MD	Qualification
1	PAC	Los Angeles Gladiators	10	9	1	0.90	30	11	1	+19	Advance to stage playoffs
2	PAC	Los Angeles Valiant	10	9	1	0.90	28	13	2	+15	Advance to stage playoffs
3	ATL	New York Excelsior	10	7	3	0.70	28	13	2	+15	Advance to stage playoffs
4	PAC	Dallas Fuel	10	6	4	0.60	22	17	1	+5	Advance to stage playoffs
5	ATL	Houston Outlaws	10	6	4	0.60	22	18	1	+4	
6	ATL	Philadelphia Fusion	10	6	4	0.60	22	18	1	+4	
7	PAC	San Francisco Shock	10	5	5	0.50	23	16	2	+7	
8	ATL	Boston Uprising	10	4	6	0.40	20	19	2	+1	
9	ATL	London Spitfire	10	4	6	0.40	18	23	2	−5	
10	PAC	Seoul Dynasty	10	3	7	0.30	19	25	0	−6	
11	ATL	Florida Mayhem	10	1	9	0.10	7	34	1	−27	
12	PAC	Shanghai Dragons	10	0	10	0.00	4	36	1	−32	

Source: The Overwatch League
Rules for classification: 1) winning percentage; 2) map differential; 3) head-to-head map differential; 4) head-to-head record

==== Playoffs ====
After the group stage, the Los Angeles Gladiators finished atop the league via a map differential tiebreaker. They earned the right to choose their opponent for the first round of the playoffs. For the first time in this selection process, the team with the best record did not choose the lowest ranked team. They choose their crosstown rivals, the second-seeded Los Angeles Valiant. The Valiant won the series in 5 maps. In the next series, the two-time stage champion New York Excelsior defeated the Dallas Fuel, 3–2. The Excelsior were unable to win their third consecutive stage championship, losing to the Valiant, 3–1.

Stage Semifinals; Sunday, June 17, 2018
1	Los Angeles Gladiators	2
2	Los Angeles Valiant	3
3	New York Excelsior	3
4	Dallas Fuel	2

Stage Finals; Sunday, June 17, 2018
2	Los Angeles Valiant	3
3	New York Excelsior	1

== Playoffs ==
After the regular season, the New York Excelsior and the Los Angeles Valiant finished atop their respective divisions, earning first-round byes. The next four remaining teams, Boston Uprising, Los Angeles Gladiators, London Spitfire, and Philadelphia Fusion, were seeded according to regular season record, regardless of division. The third-seeded Uprising played the sixth-seeded Fusion, while the fourth-seeded Gladiators played the fifth-seeded Spitfire. Each series was a best of 3 matches (each match was best of 5 maps). The winners of the two semifinal matches advanced to the Grand Finals, which took place at Barclays Center in Brooklyn, New York from July 27–28.

=== Bracket ===
Quarterfinals; July 11–14, 2018
3	Boston Uprising	1
6	Philadelphia Fusion	2
4	Los Angeles Gladiators	1
5	London Spitfire	2

Semifinals; July 18–21, 2018
1	New York Excelsior	0
6	Philadelphia Fusion	2
2	Los Angeles Valiant	0
5	London Spitfire	2

Grand Finals; July 27–28, 2018
5	London Spitfire	2
6	Philadelphia Fusion	0

=== Quarterfinals ===
Team	Match 1	Match 2	Match 3	Match Wins
(6) Philadelphia Fusion	3	1	3	2
(3) Boston Uprising	1	3	1	1

Team	Match 1	Match 2	Match 3	Match Wins
(5) London Spitfire	0	3	3	2
(4) Los Angeles Gladiators	3	0	0	1

=== Semifinals ===
Team	Match 1	Match 2	Match 3	Match Wins
(6) Philadelphia Fusion	3	3	–	2
(1) New York Excelsior	0	2	–	0

Team	Match 1	Match 2	Match 3	Match Wins
(5) London Spitfire	3	3	–	2
(2) Los Angeles Valiant	1	0	–	0

=== Grand Finals ===
Team	Match 1	Match 2	Match 3	Match Wins
(6) Philadelphia Fusion	1	0	–	0
(5) London Spitfire	3	3	–	2

== Awards ==
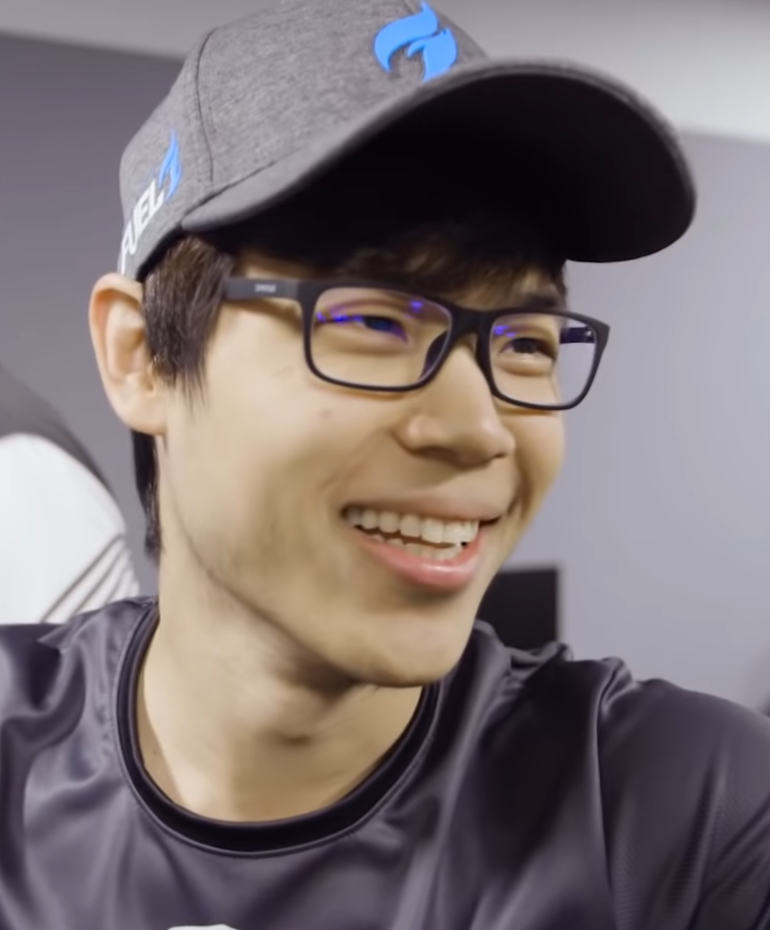
Pongphop "Mickie" Rattanasangchod was awarded the Dennis Hawelka Award

2018 OWL Awards
Award	Recipient	Runners-up
Most Valuable Player (MVP)	Bang "JJonak" Seong-hyun (New York Excelsior)	Baek "Fissure" Chan-hyung (Los Angeles Gladiators); Lee "Carpe" Jae-hyeok (Philadelphia Fusion)
Dennis Hawelka Award	Pongphop "Mickie" Rattanasangchod (Dallas Fuel)	–
Grand Finals MVP	Park "Profit" Joon-yeong (London Spitfire)	–

From JJonak's MVP award, Blizzard created a special cosmetic skin for Zenyatta, the character that JJonak most frequently played, which was offered to viewers and players during the 2019 season.

== All-Star Game ==
The 2018 Overwatch League All-Star Game was the Overwatch League's first edition of an all-star game that involved the All-Star players of the league. The game was played on August 26, 2018, and was the culmination of the league's All-Star Weekend, a two-day event that consisted of Lúcioball, Mystery Heroes, a Widowmaker 1v1 tournament, Talent Takedown, and Lockout Elimination. All of the events were played at Blizzard Arena in Burbank, California. The game was televised by Disney XD and ESPN3 and streamed live on Twitch.

Team	Map 1	Map 2	Map 3	Map 4	Map 5	Map Wins
Atlantic Division	2	3	4	2	3	4
Pacific Division	3	2	3	1	2	1

== Winnings ==
Teams in the first season competed for a total prize pool of US$3.5 million across regular season play, stage finals, and playoffs. By league rules, at least 50% of these winnings were split among the team's members, the remaining going to the team's owner.

Stage Playoffs
Pos	Team	Bonus
Stage 1 Playoffs
1	London Spitfire	$100,000
2	New York Excelsior	$25,000
Stage 2 Playoffs
1	New York Excelsior	$100,000
2	Philadelphia Fusion	$25,000
Stage 3 Playoffs
1	New York Excelsior	$100,000
2	Boston Uprising	$25,000
Stage 4 Playoffs
1	Los Angeles Valiant	$100,000
2	New York Excelsior	$25,000

Regular season
Pos	Teams	Bonus
1	New York Excelsior	$300,000
2	Los Angeles Valiant	$200,000
3	Boston Uprising	$150,000
4	Los Angeles Gladiators	$150,000
5	London Spitfire	$100,000
6	Philadelphia Fusion	$100,000
7	Houston Outlaws	$75,000
8	Seoul Dynasty	$75,000
9	San Francisco Shock	$50,000
10	Dallas Fuel	$50,000
11	Florida Mayhem	$25,000
12	Shanghai Dragons	$25,000

Season Playoffs
Pos	Teams	Bonus
1	London Spitfire	$1,000,000
2	Philadelphia Fusion	$400,000
3	New York Excelsior	$100,000
4	Los Angeles Valiant	$100,000
5	Boston Uprising	$50,000
6	Los Angeles Gladiators	$50,000
