= Los Angeles Gladiators =

American professional esports team

- Founded: August 10, 2017
- Folded: October 2, 2023
- League: Overwatch League
- Region: West
- Team history: Los Angeles Gladiators (2017–2023)
- Based in: Los Angeles, California
- Colors
- Owner: Stan Kroenke; Josh Kroenke
- Head coach: Sam "face" Merewether
- General manager: Brenda "bsuh" Suh
- Affiliation: Gladiators Legion
- Parent group: Kroenke Sports & Entertainment
- Website: Official website

Uniforms

The Los Angeles Gladiators were an American professional Overwatch esports team based in Los Angeles, California. The Gladiators competed in the Overwatch League (OWL) as a member of the league's West region. Founded in 2017, the Los Angeles Gladiators were one of twelve founding members of the OWL and one of two professional Overwatch teams based in Los Angeles (the other, the Los Angeles Valiant). The team was owned by Stan Kroenke and Josh Kroenke of Kroenke Sports & Entertainment, who also owned Gladiators Legion, an academy team for Los Angeles that competed in Overwatch Contenders.

The Gladiators made a season playoff appearance in every season from 2018 to 2022. They claimed their first midseason tournament title in 2021, after winning the 2021 Countdown Cup. In 2022, they won two more midseason tournament titles, the regional Kickoff Clash and global Midseason Madness.

== Franchise history ==
=== Team creation: Joining the Overwatch League ===
On August 10, 2017, Blizzard officially announced that KSE Esports, owned by Stan Kroenke and Josh Kroenke, had acquired the second Los Angeles–based Overwatch League franchise spot. On November 2, as the twelfth and final franchise to unveil their branding, the team revealed the franchise would be called the Los Angeles Gladiators, as well as formally announcing they had partnered with Rob Moore's Phoenix1 (later renamed to Sentinels after the partnership) to help manage the operations of the team. During the same announcement, they unveiled their initial seven-player inaugural season roster, consisting of a mix of nationalities, as well as their head coach David "Dpei" Pei.

=== Competitive history: 2018–2023 ===
Los Angeles' first OWL regular season match was on January 10, 2018, and resulted in a 4–0 sweep over the Shanghai Dragons. The Gladiators went 10–10 through the first half of the season, prompting them to make roster changes, including the acquisition of tank players Baek "Fissure" Chan-hyung from the London Spitfire in February and Kang "Void" Jun-woo from Contenders team KongDoo Panthera in March. Los Angeles reached the playoffs in Stage 3, where they lost to the Boston Uprising, 0–3, in the first round. The team thrived in the final stage of the season. Behind MVP runner up Fissure, the Gladiators finished Stage 4 with a league-best 9–1 record. The team unexpectedly chose the second-seeded Valiant as their first opponents in the Stage 4 playoffs; the Valiant subsequently defeated the Gladiators by a score of 3–2. With a 25–15 regular season record, the Gladiators claimed the fourth seed in the season playoffs. In their first playoff series, the Gladiators faced the Spitfire. The team elected to bench Fissure in favor of Luis "iRemiix" Galarza Figueroa throughout the best-of-three series; although the organization stated that the reason for the change was because Fissure's playstyle was not "right" for the current state of the game, journalist Rod "Slasher" Breslau reported that Fissure was "unhappy with the players on the team not trying hard enough ... and stopped communicating in scrims." In the series, Los Angeles won the first match, 3–0. However, they lost the next two matches despite leading 2–0 in both, ending their playoff run.

In the offseason preceding the 2019 season, the Gladiators made several roster changes, including transferring Fissure to the Seoul Dynasty. The team made two core pickups, signing Gee "Roar" Chang-hoon as Fissure's replacement and touted rookie damage player Jang "Decay" Gui-un to play alongside existing damage players Lane "Surefour" Roberts and João Pedro "Hydration" Goes Telles. Outside of a six-game winning streak in Stage 2, the team found middling results throughout the season, finishing with a 17–11 overall record and the fifth seed in the season playoffs. The Gladiators' first playoff match in the double-elimination tournament was against the Hangzhou Spark on September 5; they defeated the Spark, 4–3, marking the team's first ever playoff series win, including stage playoffs, in franchise history. The win advanced the team to the first round in the upper bracket, but they lost to the Vancouver Titans, 2–4, sending them to the lower bracket. Los Angeles' season came to an end after the following match, when they were swept 0–4 by the San Francisco Shock.

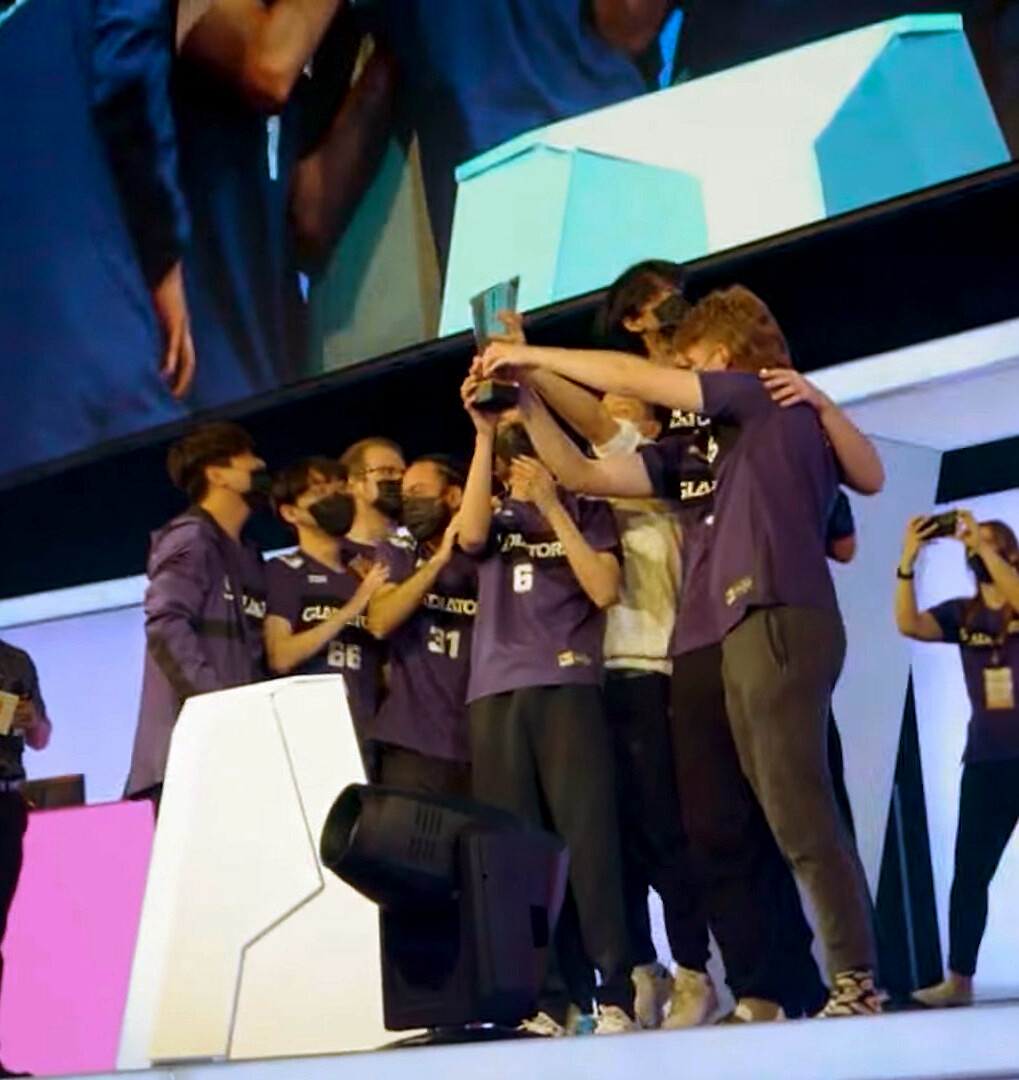
Gladiator players holding the 2022 Kickoff Clash trophy

In the offseason before the 2020 season, controversy arose between Kroenke Sports & Entertainment (KSE) and its partner management organization Sentinels. Sentinels CEO Rob Moore filed suit against KSE, alleging that KSE executive Josh Kroenke had violated a verbal joint venture agreement between the two sides. In the aftermath from the lawsuit, it was announced that KSE and Sentinels would part ways, and KSE would officially take over management of the Gladiators on October 1, 2019. KSE would build up their own esports front office to manage both the Gladiators and a Los Angeles–based franchise in the Call of Duty League, which was later revealed as the Los Angeles Guerrillas.

The Gladiators parted ways with all but two of their players from the 2019 season, retaining only main support Benjamin "BigGoose" Isohanni and flex support Jonas "Shaz" Suovaara; among the many acquisitions of the offseason were veterans tank Indy "Space" Halpern, tank Son "OGE" Min-seok, and damage player Kim "Birdring" Ji-hyeok. The Gladiators finished their 2020 season with 11 wins and 10 losses to claim the sixth seed in the North America region. On September 4, Los Angeles advanced to the season playoffs after a 3–2 win over the Toronto Defiant in the North American play-in tournament. In the first round of the North American playoffs, the Gladiators were swept by the Philadelphia Fusion, sending them to the lower bracket. They lost to the Florida Mayhem in the first round of the lower bracket, which eliminated them from the playoffs.

In the 2021 offseason, the Gladiators made several roster changes, including the departure of BigGoose and Shaz, who had been with the team since their inauguration, and the signing of support player Grant "Moth" Espe, who was coming off of back-to-back OWL championships with the San Francisco Shock. The Gladiators competed in and won the SteelSeries Invitational, winning the final match 3–0 against the Boston Uprising. The team failed to reach any of the first three midseason tournament interregional tournaments, despite promising showings in some of the qualifiers. However, in the fourth, and final, midseason tournament, the Countdown Cup, the Gladiators defeated the Chengdu Hunters in the finals by a score of 4–3. The win gave Los Angeles their first midseason tournament title in franchise history. With an 11–5 regular season record, the Gladiators finished in second place in the Western region standings, qualifying them for the season playoffs. While the team defeated the Philadelphia Fusion in the first round of the double-elimination tournament, consecutive losses to the Atlanta Reign and the Shanghai Dragons ended their playoff run.

In the offseason preceding the 2022 season, the Gladiators parted ways with head coach Dpei, as well as several players, including Moth and Birdring. The team brought on Sam "face" Merewether, who was a former assistant coach to Dpei, as their new head coach. Additionally, they signed support Daniel "FunnyAstro" Hathaway and damage duo Lee "ANS" Seon-chan and Patiphan "Patiphan" Chaiwong. The Gladiators won the Western region Kickoff Clash, the first tournament of the season, after they defeated the Dallas Fuel in the finals by a score of 4–0. On July 23, the team won the season's first global tournament, the Midseason Madness, after defeating the San Francisco Shock in the finals, 4–2.

== Team identity ==
On November 2, 2017, the Los Angeles Gladiators brand was officially unveiled. The name and logo, a roaring lion head in a battle-hardened shield, were selected in spirit of the original superstars of sports and entertainment (as well as the Los Angeles Memorial Coliseum), the gladiators of ancient Rome, whose ferocity and "willingness to make the ultimate sacrifice captured the hearts of millions of people of all backgrounds for centuries". Continuing the gladiator theme, the team colors were announced as purple and white, inspired by the royal colors of the Roman emperors that the gladiators fought for. In addition, the written logo was revealed with a contrasting color used intentionally for the connected letters L and A in "Gladiators", to highlight the Los Angeles location of the team.

As part of their branding, the Gladiators began using the slogan "shields up" on social media, possibly a reference to the ancient Roman gladiators' frequent use of shields for defense. As a result, fans of the team have often chanted "Shields up" during the team's matches. When asked what the slogan meant to him in an interview, head coach David "Dpei" Pei stated, "It's kind of like defending your team, like being there for your team … I think that's what kind of epitomizes the Gladiators' saying 'shields up.'"

Zayde Wølf's song "Gladiator" was used by the team during their last entrance of the 2018 playoffs. The song became popular with the team's fans, and since then, it has been used by the team for almost every single one of their entrances at the arena.

== Personnel ==
=== Current roster ===
Los Angeles Gladiators roster
Players
Coaches

Role	No.	Handle	Name	Nationality
Damage	18	kevster	Persson, Kevin	Sweden
Damage	23	Kai	Collins, Kai	United Kingdom
Damage	27	Yaki	Kim Jun-ki	South Korea
Tank	11	Marve1	Hwang Min-seo	South Korea
Support	33	FunnyAstro	Hathaway, Daniel	United Kingdom
Support	77	Lastro	Mun Jung-won	South Korea
Support	16	Babel	Park Sang-jun	South Korea
Support	1	cal	Mazzucco, Matteo	Canada

Head coach

- Sam "face" Merewether

Assistant coach(es)

- Max "Unter" Unterwurzacher
- Cho "SMASH" Bee-won

Legend:
- (I) Inactive
- (S) Suspended
- (2W) Two-way player
- Substitute
- (injured) Injury / Illness

Latest roster transaction: July 24, 2023.

=== Head coaches ===
Handle	Name	Seasons	Record	Notes	Ref.
Dpei	David Pei	2018–2021	64–41 (.610)		
face	Sam Merewether	2022–present	24–16 (.600)		

== Awards and records ==
=== Seasons overview ===
Season	P	W	L	W%	Finish	Playoffs
2018	40	25	15	.625	2nd, Pacific	Lost in Quarterfinals, 0–2 (Spitfire)
2019	28	17	11	.607	4th, Pacific	Lost in Lower Round 2, 0–4 (Shock)
2020	21	11	10	.524	5th, North America	Lost in NA Lower Round 1, 0–3 (Mayhem)
2021	16	11	5	.688	2nd, West	Lost in Lower Round 2, 2–3 (Reign)
2022	24	18	6	.750	3rd, West	Lost in Lower Round 2, 1–3 (Shock)
2023	16	6	10	.375	11th, West	Did not qualify

=== Individual accomplishments ===
Role Star selections

- kevster (Kevin Persson) – 2021
- SPACE (Indy Halpern) – 2021
- Shu (Kim Jin-seo) – 2021

All-Star Game selections

- BigG00se (Benjamin Isohanni) – 2018
- Fissure (Baek Chan-hyung) – 2018 (Note: Fissure was selected to the 2018 All-Star Game whilst a member of the Gladiators, but was transferred to the Seoul Dynasty in the offseason period prior to the All-Star Game and, thus, would represent the Dynasty while participating in the event.)
- Surefour (Lane Roberts) – 2018
- Bischu (Aaron Kim) – 2018
- Decay (Jang Gui-Un) – 2019
- SPACE (Indy Halpern) – 2020
- Birdring (Kim Ji-heyok) – 2020

== Academy team ==
On February 15, 2018, the Gladiators formally announced their academy team would go under the name "Gladiators Legion" for Overwatch Contenders North America, as well as revealing their 6-player Season One roster led by head coach Gannon "RaptorZ" Nelson. In December 2019, Gladiators Legion disbanded, after two years of competing in Overwatch Contenders.
