= New York Excelsior =

Defunct American professional esports team

- Short name: NYXL
- Founded: July 12, 2017
- Folded: January 23, 2024
- League: Overwatch League
- Region: West
- Based in: New York City, U.S.
- Colors
- Owner: Jeff Wilpon
- Head coach: Kim "KuKi" Dae-kuk
- Affiliation: NYXL Academy
- Main sponsor: Astro Gaming
- Website: Official website

Uniforms

The New York Excelsior (often stylized as NYXL) was an American professional Overwatch esports team based in New York City, New York. The Excelsior competed in the Overwatch League (OWL) as a member of the league's West region. Founded in 2017, the team was one of twelve founding members of the Overwatch League and was the first professional esports team to represent the city of New York. The franchise was owned by NYXL, which was founded under the name Andbox by venture capital fund Sterling.VC, supported by Sterling Equities. They also owned NYXL Academy, an academy team for NYXL that competed in Overwatch Contenders. The team folded when the Overwatch League folded on January 23, 2024.

Hyun-sang "Pavane" Yu was appointed the team's first head coach and led New York to two conference titles, all seven midseason tournament playoff appearances, midseason tournament titles, and a two-season playoff berths in his time from 2018 to 2019. NYXL missed the season playoffs for the first time in franchise history in the 2021 season.

== Franchise history ==
=== Beginnings ===
On July 12, 2017, Overwatch developer Activision Blizzard officially announced that Jeff Wilpon, co-founder and partner of Sterling.VC, purchased the New York-based Overwatch League franchise for an estimated $20 million. With the purchase, the franchise became the first professional esports team to represent New York City. "We sort of skirted around it in the periphery, looked at a couple of teams, made a couple of investments in some companies that do work within esports but never had the real opportunity to buy a team like this," Wilpon said in an interview. "Knowing how committed Activision Blizzard is in this space, it made sense to come in. With people like the Krafts involved, it just gave a good feeling to this."

On October 30, the franchise revealed they would be called the New York Excelsior, as well as unveiling their team branding and inaugural season roster. The roster would entail the acquisitions of the complete LuxuryWatch Blue team, LuxuryWatch Red's Hong "Ark" Yeon-jun and coaches Yu "Pavane" Hyun-sang and Kim "WizardHyeong" Hyeong-seok, and Meta Athena's Kim "Libero" Hae-seong.

=== JJonak era: 2018–2021 ===
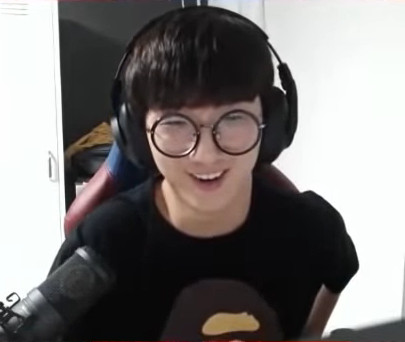
Bang "JJonak" Seong-hyun was the league's first MVP award winner.

The Excelsior first OWL regular season match was on January 11, 2018, and resulted in a 3–1 win over the Boston Uprising. They ended Stage 1 of the 2018 season with a 9–1 record, earning them the top spot and first-round bye in the Stage 1 Playoffs. However, the team lost in the finals to the London Spitfire, 3–2. Stage 2 played out much like Stage 1 for New York, as the team went on to post again a 9–1 record and a first-round bye into the Stage 2 Playoffs. New York defeated the Philadelphia Fusion, 3–2, on March 25 to claim their first midseason tournament title. In Stage 3, New York once again posted a 9–1 record, giving them the second seed for the Stage 3 Playoffs. The team won in the Stage 3 finals against Boston Uprising by a score of 3–0, giving New York back-to-back midseason tournament titles. New York posted their worst record, 7–3, in Stage 4, but still claimed the third seed for the Stage 4 Playoffs. They lost in the Stage 4 finals against the Los Angeles Valiant by a score of 1–3. New York ended their 2018 season with a league-best 34–6 record and qualified for a first-round bye into the season playoffs. The team's first playoff opponent was the Philadelphia Fusion in the semifinals on July 18 and 21. New York lost both matchups by scores of 0–3 and 2–3, eliminating them from the playoffs. Support player Bang "JJonak" Seong-hyun was won the league's regular season Most Valuable Player award.

New York began their 2019 season with a perfect 7–0 record in Stage 1, giving them the top seed in the Atlantic Division for the Stage 1 playoffs; however, the team lost 1–3 to the Seoul Dynasty quarterfinals. NYXL posted a 5–2 record for Stage 2 and claimed the fifth seed for the Stage 2 Playoffs, but they lost in the semifinals to the Vancouver Titans by a score of 1–4. Another perfect 7–0 record in Stage 3 gave New York the top seed in the Stage 3 playoffs; however, team failed to claim the stage title, as they fell 1–3 to the Shanghai Dragons in the quarterfinals. Following a 3–1 victory over the Paris Eternal on August 2, the Excelsior clinched the second seed – and the top seed in the Atlantic Division – in the 2019 playoffs. The team finished the regular season with a 22–6 record. NYXL opened their playoffs with a 4–1 win over the London Spitfire on September 6. For their next match, they took down the Atlanta Reign, 4–2, and advanced to the winners' finals, where they faced the Vancouver Titans. A 3–4 loss to the Titans dropped New York to the lower bracket of the tournament. The Excelsior's playoff run ended in the lower bracket finals, as they were defeated by the San Francisco Shock, 0–4.

In the offseason preceding the 2020 season, head coach Yu "Pavane" Hyun-sang left for the Philadelphia Fusion, and NYXL promoted assistant coach Jeong "IMT" Yong-cheol to head coach. The Excelsior opened the 2020 season on February 8, 2020, hosting the league's first homestand, a hybrid model of the home-and-away structure seen in traditional sports, of the season at the sold-out Hammerstein Ballroom in New York. After a 5–1 start to the season, the Excelsior, and the entire league, ceased play due to the COVID-19 pandemic and shifted to an online play format. With large number of outbreaks in New York State, the team decided to relocate to South Korea, where they would be competing in the league's newly formed Asia region thereafter. After a 10–3 record through the regular season, NYXL signed 2019 Rookie of the Year Kim "Haksal" Hyo-jong. New York finished the regular season with a 16–8, including bonus wins, and qualified for the season playoffs; however, they were eliminated after a loss to the Seoul Dynasty.

Heading into the 2021 season, the Excelsior released their entire roster, aside from JJonak, and signed a team consisting of mostly rookies from Korean Overwatch Contenders teams. Additionally, New York promoted Lee "WhyNot" Ju-hyeop to head coach. New York stayed in South Korea, competing in the league's Eastern region, formerly known as the Asia region. The team had their worst season in franchise history, finishing in sixth place in the East region with a 7–9 regular season record and missing out on the season playoffs.

=== 2022–2024 ===
For the 2022 season, the Excelsior returned to New York to compete in the league's Western division. New York dropped almost all of their entire roster ahead of the 2022 season, including their starting support player for the previous four seasons JJonak. NYXL signed several veterans players, one rookie player, and signed former RunAway coach Kim "KuKi" Dae-kuk in the offseason.

== Team identity ==
The franchise's name is based on the New York state motto, Excelsior, which means 'ever upward' in Latin. The motto was selected for embodying the team's commitment to "reaching the top and never letting up". It and its abbreviation XL, also represent the endless ambition of ever-growing New York City at its most powerful.

Unique as the only flag-based logo in the Overwatch League, the logo symbolizes the coming together of people, cultures, and ideas. The lines and shapes featured on the flag are also representative of New York specific things, such as the subway systems, skylines, and grid of the city.

== Sponsors ==
New York Excelsior currently has two partnerships. In November 2018, New York Excelsior partnered with Raynor Gaming as its official gaming chair partner. In February 2019, New York Excelsior partnered with telecommunications brand T-Mobile as a new sponsor.

== Personnel ==
=== Current roster ===
New York Excelsior roster
Players	Coaches
Role / No. / Handle / Name / Nationality	Head coach: Vacant
Legend: (I) Inactive; (S) Suspended; (2W) Two-way player; Substitute; (injured) Injury / Illness	Latest roster transaction: October 16, 2023.

=== Head coaches ===
Handle	Name	Seasons	Record	Notes	Ref.
Pavane	Yu Hyun-sang	2018–2019	56–12 (.824)		
imt	Jeong Yong-cheol	2020	13–8 (.619)		
WhyNot	Lee Juh-yeop	2021	7–9 (.438)		
KuKi	Kim Dae-kuk	2022	1–11 (.083)	Released after 12 games in 2022.	
Changgoon	Park Chang-geun	2023	7–9 (.438)	Co-head coaches	
Amir	Amir Ahmed	2023	7–9 (.438)	Co-head coaches	

== Awards and records ==
=== Seasons overview ===
Season	P	W	L	W%	Finish	Playoffs
2018	40	34	6	.850	1st, Atlantic	Lost in Semifinals, 0–2 (Fusion)
2019	28	22	6	.786	1st, Atlantic	Lost in Lower Round 4, 0–4 (Shock)
2020	21	13	8	.619	4th, Asia	Lost in Asia Lower Final, 0–3 (Dynasty)
2021	16	7	9	.438	6th, East	Did not qualify
2022	24	4	20	.167	12th, West	Did not qualify
2023	16	7	9	.438	9th, West	Did not qualify

=== Individual accomplishments ===
Season MVP

- JJonak (Bang Seong-hyun) – 2018

Role Stars selections

- Mano (Kim Dong-gyu) – 2019

All-Star Game selections

- Ark (Hong Yeon-jun) – 2018
- Libero (Kim Hae-seong) – 2018
- Saebyeolbe (Park Jong-ryeol) – 2018
- JJonak (Bang Seong-hyun) – 2018, 2019, 2020
- Mano (Kim Dong-gyu) – 2018, 2019, 2020
- Meko (Kim Tae-hong) – 2018, 2019
- Pine (Kim Do-hyeon) – 2018, 2019
- Anamo (Jung Tae-Sung) – 2019
- Nenne (Jeong Yeon-Gwan) – 2019
- Haksal (Kim Hyo-jung) – 2020

All-Star Game head coaches

- Pavane (Yu Hyun-sang) – 2018, 2019

== Academy team ==
On February 20, 2018, the Excelsior formally announced their academy team would go under the name XL2 Academy for Overwatch Contenders North America, as well as revealing their initial 6-player squad.
