= Philadelphia Fusion =

American professional esports team

- Founded: September 20, 2017
- League: Overwatch League
- Region: East
- Team history: Philadelphia Fusion (2017–2022); Seoul Infernal (2023)
- Based in: Philadelphia, Pennsylvania; Seoul, South Korea
- Colors
- Owner: Comcast Spectacor
- Head coach: Cho "J1N" Hyo-jin
- Affiliations: Fusion University; T1
- Website: Official website

The Philadelphia Fusion was a professional Overwatch esports team based in Philadelphia, Pennsylvania. The team competed in the Overwatch League (OWL) as a member of the league's East region from 2017 to 2023. Founded in 2017, it is one of the league's twelve founding members and was the first professional esports team based in Pennsylvania. For their final season in 2023, the team relocated to Seoul, South Korea and became the Seoul Infernal. The team was owned by Comcast Spectacor, who also own the Philadelphia Flyers of the National Hockey League (NHL). It also manages Fusion University and T1, academy teams for the Infernal that compete in Overwatch Contenders.

The team has reached the season playoffs three times, including an appearance at the inaugural season Grand Finals, where they lost to the London Spitfire.

== Franchise history ==
=== Beginnings ===
On September 20, 2017, Overwatch developer Activision Blizzard officially announced that Philadelphia Flyers owner Comcast Spectacor had acquired the rights to the Philadelphia-based Overwatch League franchise. With the purchase, the franchise became the first professional esports team to be based in the city of Philadelphia. Dave Scott, CEO at Comcast Spectacor, said that his decision to buy into the league was based on research that showed there were over 300,000 Overwatch players in the market. "I was surprised as we started to look at this seriously a few months ago, just the number of gamers worldwide being in the hundreds of millions," he said. "It's amazing when you really get into it — 350,000-plus Overwatch players in this market."

On November 1, the franchise name was revealed as the Philadelphia Fusion. Shortly afterwards on November 3, their roster was revealed.

=== Philadelphia Fusion (2018–2022) ===
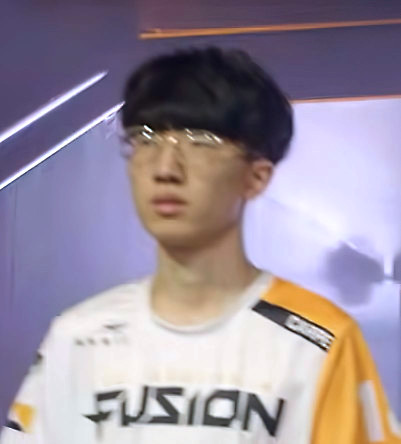
Carpe had been with the team since its inaugural season.

Philadelphia opened their inaugural season with a 3–2 victory over the Houston Outlaws on January 11. On January 25, Philadelphia upset the undefeated New York Excelsior, which marked New York's only loss in Stage 1. During the Stage 2 playoffs, the team defeated the Stage 1 champions London Spitfire in the semifinals, though they lost to the New York Excelsior, 3–2, in the stage finals. The team then missed both the Stage 3 and 4 playoffs. They claimed the sixth seed in the season playoffs They defeated the Boston Uprising in the quarterfinals, 2 games to 1. They then faced the three-time stage champions Excelsior, who the Fusion defeated 2 games to 0, which sent them to the Grand Finals. They faced the Spitfire in the Grand Finals; the Spitfire defeated the Fusion 2 games to 0.

For their 2019 season, the team was led by co-head coaches Go "NamedHwi" Se-hwi and Elliot "Hayes" Hayes. The Fusion had a solid Stage 1 performance, finishing the stage with a 5–2 record and making it to the Stage 1 Playoffs, but they lost 0–4 in the semifinals to the San Francisco Shock. After posting 3–4 and 4–3 records for Stage 2 and Stage 3, respectively, Philadelphia failed to qualify any other stage playoffs. A 3–1 victory over the Seoul Dynasty in their final regular season match gave the Fusion a 15–13 season record and qualified them for the Play-In Tournament. Philadelphia fell 2–4 to the Shanghai Dragons in the first round of the tournament, ending their hope of qualifying for the season playoffs.

Prior to their 2020 season, both co-head coaches Se-hwi "NamedHwi" Go and Elliot "Hayes" Hayes announced their departures from the team. The team found their replacement on October 25, 2019, with the hiring of former Seoul Dynasty head coach Kim "KDG" Dong-gun. Over the course of the 2020 season, the Philadelphia Fusion reached the finals of two of the three mid season tournaments: the Summer Showdown and the Countdown Cup, losing both to the Paris Eternal and San Francisco Shock, respectively. The Fusion finished the regular season in second place in the overall standings, with a 24–2 record. Advancing to the season playoffs, Philadelphia swept both the Los Angeles Gladiators and Los Angeles Valiant by scores of 3–0 in the first two rounds of the North America bracket. In the upper finals match, which took place on September 12, Philadelphia were handed their first loss of the postseason, falling to San Francisco by a score of 1–3. After sweeping the Washington Justice, 3–0, the Fusion advanced to the Grand Finals bracket. The Fusion's first match in the Grand Finals bracket was on October 8, where they were swept, 0–3, by the Shanghai Dragons. The following day, they were swept, 0–3, by the Seoul Dynasty, ending their postseason run. Fusion support player Kim "Alarm" Kyeong-bo won the league's Rookie of the Year award.

In the offseason preceding the 2021 season, the Fusion signed former Paris Eternal general manager Kim "NineK" Bum-hoon as their new head coach, replacing Kim "KDG" Dong-gun, who was released earlier in the offseason. Philadelphia relocated to Seoul, South Korea to compete in the league's East region; while they planned to bring their team, which was composed of many European and Middle Eastern players, to South Korea, COVID-19 variant outbreaks in these regions caused visa issues, preventing them from joining the team. As a result, the Fusion signed several new South Korean players to the team right before the start of the season. With a starting roster of veteran players, the Fusion began the season with a perfect 4–0 start in the May Melee qualifiers. However, they lost to the Shanghai Dragons in the following regional knockout, failing to advance to the interregional tournament. Plagued with ongoing visa issues, the Fusion qualified for the season playoffs, after defeating the Hangzhou Spark and Seoul Dynasty in the Eastern region play-in tournament. However, losses to the Los Angeles Gladiators and San Francisco Shock in their first two matches of the double-elimination tournament eliminated them from the playoffs.

The Fusion announced in January 2022 that they would continue to compete in South Korea as a part of the East region for the 2022 season. The team parted ways with head coach NineK and promoted Cho "J1N" Hyo-jin, who was the head coach of their Overwatch Contenders academy team T1, to head coach. Philadelphia released their entire roster in the offseason, aside from damage player Lee "Carpe" Jae-hyeok and support player Kim "Alarm" Kyeong-bo, and signed two rookies from T1. After the death of Alarm in November 2021, the Fusion signed two more veterans to fill out a five-man roster.

=== Seoul Infernal (2023) ===
On December 30, 2022, Comcast Spectacor announced that from the 2023 season onward, the Fusion would be rebranding to the Seoul Infernal and relocating to Seoul, South Korea, where they would share facilities with T1, who is co-owned by Comcast Spectacor. The decision to move cities and change branding was met with criticism by fans who had supported the team.

== Sponsors ==
On January 21, 2019, Philadelphia Fusion received an official jersey sponsorship from telecommunications equipment manufacturing company ARRIS.

== Personnel ==
=== Current roster ===
Seoul Infernal roster
Players	Coaches
Role / No. / Handle / Name / Nationality	Head coach: Vacant
Legend: (I) Inactive; (S) Suspended; (2W) Two-way player; Substitute; (injured) Injury / Illness	Latest roster transaction: November 27, 2023.

=== Head coaches ===
Handle	Name	Seasons	Record	Notes	Ref.
Kirby	Yann Luu	2018	24–16 (.600)		
NamedHwi	Sehwi Go	2019	15–13 (.536)	Co-head coaches.	
Hayes	Elliot Hayes	2019	15–13 (.536)	Co-head coaches.	
KDG	Kim Dong-gun	2020	19–2 (.905)		
NineK	Kim Bum-hoon	2021	10–6 (.625)		
J1N	Cho Hyo-jin	2022–2023	11–13 (.458)		

== Awards and records ==
=== Seasons overview ===
Season	P	W	L	W%	Finish	Playoffs
2018	40	24	16	.600	4th, Atlantic	Lost in Grand Finals, 0–2 (Spitfire)
2019	28	15	13	.536	4th, Atlantic	Did not qualify
2020	21	19	2	.905	1st, North America	Lost in GF Lower Round 1, 0–3 (Dynasty)
2021	16	10	6	.625	4th, East	Lost in Lower Round 1, 2–3 (Shock)
2022	24	11	13	.458	3rd, East	Lost in Lower Round 1, 1–3 (Gladiators)

=== Individual accomplishments ===
Rookie of the Year

- Alarm (Kim Kyung-bo) – 2020

Role Star selections

- Carpe (Lee Jae-hyeok) – 2020
- Alarm (Kim Kyung-bo) – 2020

All-Star Game selections

- Carpe (Lee Jae-hyeok) – 2018, 2019, 2020
- Poko (Gaël Gouzerch) – 2018, 2019, 2020
- Alarm (Kim Kyung-bo) – 2020
- FunnyAstro (Daniel Hathaway) – 2020

All-Star Game head coaches

- KDG (Kim Dong-gun) – 2020

== Academy team ==
On January 29, 2018, the Fusion formally announced their academy team, Fusion University (FU), that would begin competition in the North American division of Overwatch Contenders.

The team won all three North American championships in 2018, as well as the first North American East championship in 2019. After winning the first Atlantic Showdown, Fusion University announced that they would be moving from the North American division to compete in Korean Trials; the move was reportedly made to abide by the new region lock rules, which were implemented in 2019 Season 1, though FU was given a season-long grace period.

On January 14, 2020, T1 Esports, a Korean organization jointly operated by Comcast Spectacor (the parent organization of the Fusion) and SK Telecom, replaced Fusion University as the new Philadelphia Fusion academy team. T1 compete in Contenders Korea where they have had middling results since their introduction in early 2020. Fusion University returned as the second academy team for the Philadelphia Fusion in May 2021; Fusion University competes in the Europe region of Contenders.
