= Los Angeles Valiant =

American professional esports team

- Founded: July 12, 2017
- Disbanded: October 16, 2023
- League: Overwatch League
- Region: West
- Team history: Immortals (2016–2017); Los Angeles Valiant (2017–2023)
- Based in: Los Angeles, California
- Colors
- Owner: Immortals Gaming Club
- Website: Official website

Uniforms

Los Angeles Valiant (stylized as VΛLIΛNT) was an American professional Overwatch esports team representing the city of Los Angeles, California. Valiant competed in the Overwatch League (OWL) as a member of the league's West region. Founded in 2017, Los Angeles Valiant was one of twelve founding members of the OWL and one of two professional Overwatch teams based in Los Angeles (the other, the Los Angeles Gladiators).

The team played out of Los Angeles from 2018 to 2020; in that time, the team won a midseason tournament title and reached the season playoffs twice. The Valiant relocated to China ahead of the 2021 season, a decision that was met with heavy criticism, and Chinese esports organizing LinGan e-Sports began operating the team. The Valiant became the second team in OWL history to have a winless season, after going 0–16 in the 2021 season. The team relocated back to North America for the 2023 season. They disbanded following the shutdown of the Overwatch League.

== Franchise history ==
=== Team creation: 2016–2017 ===
The team that would be the Los Angeles Valiant originally started out as the Overwatch team Immortals. Immortal's signed their first lineup on September 12, 2016, when the organization acquired the roster of the North American Overwatch team "Sodipop". The team competed for the first time during the Overwatch Open on September 25, 2017. Immortals placed 1st at NGE Winter Premier, Overwatch Carbon Series, and Overwatch Contenders 2017 Season Zero North America.

On July 12, 2017, Overwatch developer Activision Blizzard officially announced that Noah Whinston, CEO of esports organization Immortals, had acquired a Los Angeles-based Overwatch League franchise spot for an estimated $20 million, after almost a year of discussion. "For us, the crucial part of [our reason to join the Overwatch League] overall was the localization aspect — being able to have a local territory that we have control over and build deeper ties with a fan base than the current model really allows us to do," Whinston said in an interview. "That localization element, in addition the revenue sharing elements, and the stability and the strong competitive future of the game, all of those were important aspects for us when it came to making the decision."

On October 23, 2017, Immortals revealed their franchise name as the Los Angeles Valiant. The team revealed their starting roster over a series of Twitter posts from October 30 to November 2, consisting of four DPS, four tanks, and three supports.

=== Early years: 2018–2020 ===
Los Angeles Valiant's first OWL regular season game was a 4–0 victory against the San Francisco Shock on January 10, 2018. The Valiant posted an impressive 7–3 record in Stage 1, but did not qualify for the Stage 1 Playoffs. On February 19, two days before the beginning of Stage 2, the Los Angeles Valiant announced the departure of head coach Henry "Cuddles" Coxall. The team announced, on the same day, the hiring of Byung Chul "Moon" Moon as the team's new head coach. Stage 2 ended in a disappointing 4–6 record. The Valiant had a more successful Stage 3, as the team posted a 7–3 record – good for the 3rd seed in the Stage 3 Playoffs. The team faced off against the 2nd-seeded New York Excelsior in the semifinals of the Stage 3 Playoffs, but the Valiant lost in a 0–3 sweep Los Angeles Valiant had its best stage in the 4th stage. The team was undefeated going into the final regular season game against the Dallas Fuel. The Valiant lost that matchup by a score of 3 to 1, giving them a 9–1 record and the 2nd seed for the Stage 4 Playoffs. The Valiant faced their intercity-rivals and top-seeded team, the Los Angeles Gladiators, in the semifinals, and were able to pull off a 3–2 victory to move on the finals against the New York Excelsior. On June 17, the Los Angeles Valiant claimed their first-ever stage title, defeating the Excelsior 3–1 in the Stage 4 Finals. The Valiant ended the regular season with a 27–13 record and the 2nd seed and a first-round bye in the season playoffs. The team's was set to face the London Spitfire in the season semifinals. The first matchup was on July 18, in which the Valiant fell to the Spitfire by a score of 1–3. On July 20, the Valiant was eliminated from the season playoffs after getting swept 0–3 in the second semifinal match against the Spitfire.

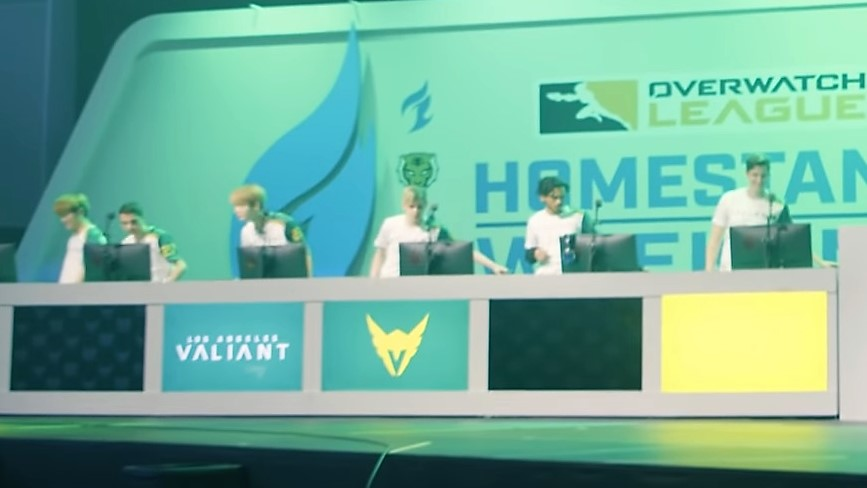
Valiant on stage in 2019

The Valiant entered the 2019 season as the defending Pacific Division champions and looked to improve from their 2018 season. Los Angeles struggled in the first stage of the season, not winning a single match in Stage 1. With the poor start, the Valiant fired head coach Moon and Mike "Packing10" Szklanny took over as the interim head coach for the remainder of the season. The team's first victory came on April 12 in a 3–2 win over the Atlanta Reign. The Valiant finished Stage 2 with an improved, but disappointing, 3–4 record. After the All-Star break, the Valiant hit their stride. Highlighted by a 3–1 win over the undefeated Vancouver Titans, the Valiant amassed a 5–2 record in Stage 3 to claim the sixth seed in the Stage 3 Playoffs. After taking down the Hangzhou Spark 3–2 in the quarterfinals, the Valiant fell to the San Francisco Shock, 0–4 in the semifinals. Despite the team's resurgence, a 0–4 to the Shock in the final match of the regular season prevented the Valiant from qualifying for the season playoffs.

For the 2020 season, the Valiant debuted new colors, trading the green and yellow color scheme that the team had used for two years in favor of blue and yellow. On August 22, the Valiant clinched a spot in the season playoffs with a win over the Vancouver Titans. In the first round of the North America bracket, Los Angeles defeated the Florida Mayhem by a score of 3–2. The following day, the Valiant were swept by the Philadelphia Fusion in the second round of the upper bracket, sending them to the lower bracket. A 1–3 loss to the Washington Justice in the subsequent round eliminated the Valiant from the playoffs.

=== Relocation to China: 2021–2022 ===
In the offseason preceding the 2021 season, the Valiant made several roster acquisitions, planning to compete in the league's Western division. However, in mid-January 2021, the team announced that it would be relocating to China to compete in the league's Eastern region. The decision to make the move was in response to a suggestion made by Overwatch League, as the league needed more teams in its Eastern region. On January 29, the Valiant released their entire roster and most staff, with Immortals Gaming Club citing visa issues in the move to China for the reason. The decision was met with heavy criticism by fans and analysts; as all teams were required to have at least seven players signed by January 4, 2021, many team rosters were already full, leaving few options for the dropped players. Several weeks later, the Immortals signed a one-year operating agreement with Chinese esports organization LinGan e-Sports (LGE), in which LGE would not acquire any share in the Valiant, nor claim any ownership. In mid-March 2021, the Valiant announced its six-player roster, consisting partly of previously retired and controversial players, which would be led by head coach Zhang "JpCat" Peng. The Valiant had their worst season in franchise history, finishing the 2021 regular season in last place with a 0–16 record. The finish made the second team in OWL history to have a winless season.

In December 2021, the Valiant announced that they would continue to compete from Asia in the Eastern division, and LGE would continue to operate the team throughout the 2022 season.

=== Return to the West: 2023 ===
In February 2023, the Valiant announced their return to the Western division for the 2023 Season and later in March signed a completely North American roster ahead of Pro-Am West.

=== Dissolution ===
In October 2023, following the termination of the Overwatch League, the Valiant ceased operations.

== Team identity ==
On October 23, 2017, the Los Angeles Valiant brand was officially unveiled. The name "Valiant" signifies heroism, courage, bravery, and determination. The logo for the Los Angeles Valiant features a golden-winged helmet that forms a "V" using negative space in the team's colors of green and gold.

As an organization, we’re laser-focused on our founding principles, core values, and commitment to be the most accessible, authentic, and transparent organization in esports. The launch of the Los Angeles Valiant allows us to double down on those values, continuing to raise the bar for community engagement and building deep, authentic connections between our team and our fans. We are absolutely competing for championships; at the same time, we’re competing to create the most unique, compelling and differentiated live entertainment experience in this marketplace. Our fans will be key pieces of both journeys.

— Immortals President and COO Ari Segal

Prior to the 2020 season, the colors were changed to baby blue, yellow, and white.

== Personnel ==
=== Current roster ===
Los Angeles Valiant roster
Players	Coaches
Role / No. / Handle / Name / Nationality	Head coach: Vacant
Legend: (I) Inactive; (S) Suspended; (2W) Two-way player; Substitute; (injured) Injury / Illness	Latest roster transaction: October 16, 2023.

=== Head coaches ===
Handle	Name	Seasons	Record	Notes	Ref.
Cuddles	Henry Coxall	2018	7–3 (.700)	Released after 10 games in 2018.	
Moon	Moon Byung-chul	2018–2019	20–17 (.541)	Released after seven games in 2019.	
Packing10	Mike Szklanny	2019–2020	23–19 (.548)		
JpCat	Zhang Peng	2021	0–16 (.000)		
NoHill	Wang Fuxing	2022	4–14 (.222)	Released after 18 games in 2022.	
Haru	Chen Xingyou	2022	3–3 (.500)		

== Awards and records ==
=== Seasons overview ===
Season	P	W	L	W%	Finish	Playoffs
2018	40	27	13	.675	1st, Pacific	Lost in Semifinals, 0–2 (Spitfire)
2019	28	12	16	.429	9th, Pacific	Did not qualify
2020	21	11	10	.524	4th, North America	Lost in NA Lower Round 2, 1–3 (Justice)
2021	16	0	16	.000	8th, East	Did not qualify
2022	24	7	17	.292	7th, East	Did not qualify
2023	16	2	14	.125	12th, West	Did not qualify

=== Individual accomplishments ===
Role Star selections

- Kariv (Park Young-seo) – 2019

Dennis Hawelka Award

- Custa (Scott Kennedy) – 2019
- McGravy (Caleb McGarvey) – 2020

All-Star Game selections

- Agilities (Brady Girardi) – 2018
- Custa (Scott Kennedy) – 2018
- Fate (Koo Pan-seung) – 2018
- Kariv (Park Young-seo) – 2018, 2020
- Soon (Terence Tarlier) – 2018
- Space (Indy Halpern) – 2018, 2019
- KSP (Kai Collins) – 2020
- McGravy (Caleb McGarvey) – 2020

All-Star Game head coaches

- Moon (Moon Byung-chul) – 2018
