= List of all-time Overwatch League win–loss records =

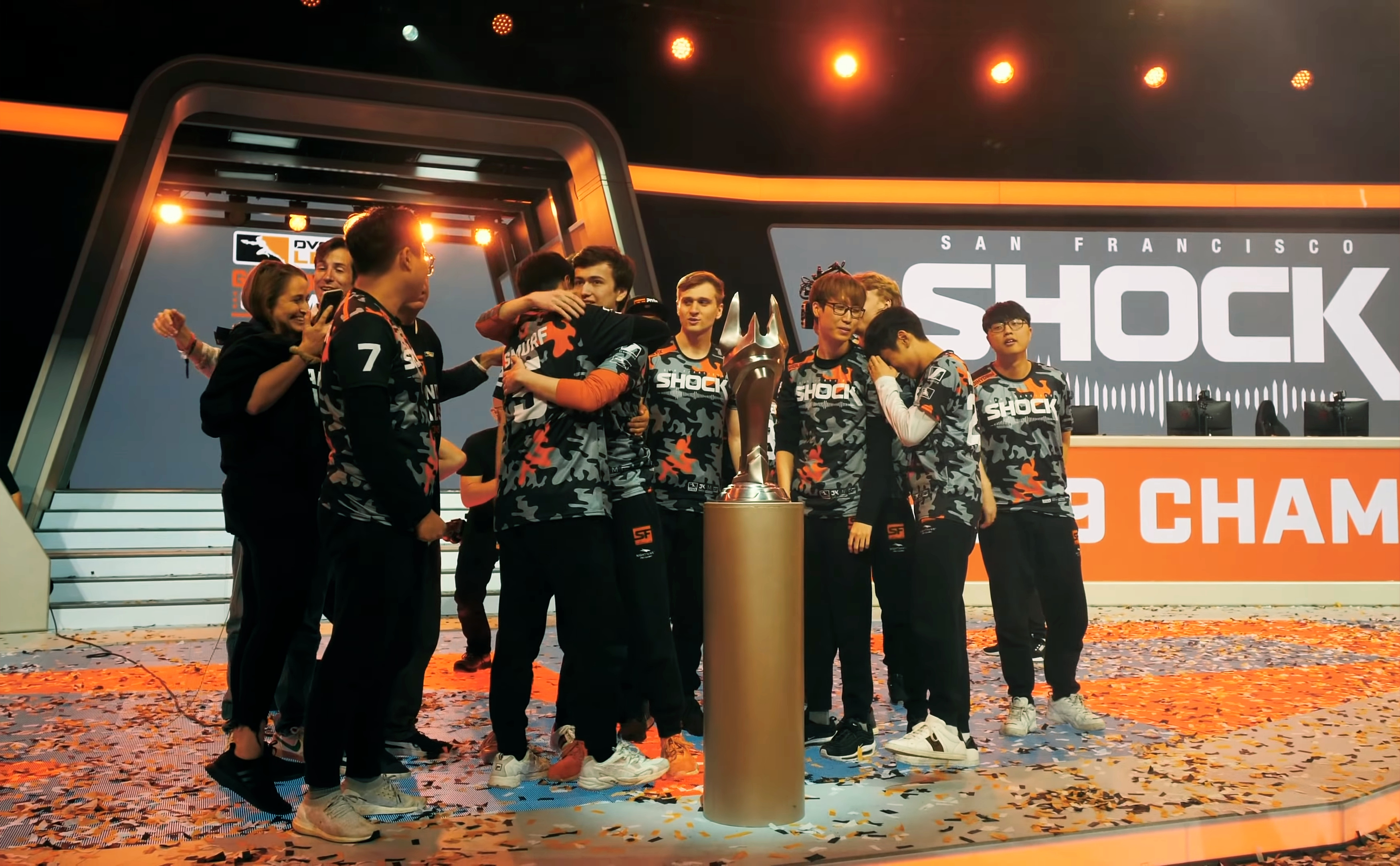
Players of the San Francisco Shock, the franchise with the highest playoff winning percentage, after winning the 2019 Grand Finals.

The following is a listing of all 20 current Overwatch League (OWL) teams ranked by win–loss record percentage (winning percentage), accurate as of the end of the 2021 season.

== Regular season ==
Key:

Best win–loss record in division

Rank	Team	P	Won	Lost	Win%	MW	ML	MT	MD	First OWL Season	Division
1	New York Excelsior	105	76	29	.724	283	143	9	+140	2018	South
2	San Francisco Shock	105	70	35	.667	268	151	9	+117	2018	East
3	Philadelphia Fusion	105	68	37	.648	246	183	8	+63	2018	North
4	Los Angeles Gladiators	105	64	41	.610	247	180	11	+67	2018	South
5	Atlanta Reign	65	37	28	.569	153	106	1	+47	2019	North
6	Seoul Dynasty	105	58	47	.552	228	190	8	+38	2018	North
7	Hangzhou Spark	65	35	30	.538	132	123	6	+9	2019	East
8	Guangzhou Charge	65	34	31	.523	125	134	6	-9	2019	East
9	Paris Eternal	65	34	31	.523	128	130	5	-2	2019	West
10	Vancouver Titans	65	32	33	.492	122	121	0	+1	2019	West
11	Chengdu Hunters	65	31	34	.477	126	135	4	-9	2019	South
12	Los Angeles Valiant	105	50	55	.476	199	214	12	-15	2018	South
13	Houston Outlaws	105	48	57	.457	207	220	11	-13	2018	North
14	London Spitfire	105	47	58	.448	199	219	10	-20	2018	West
15	Shanghai Dragons	105	44	61	.419	169	236	8	-67	2018	East
16	Boston Uprising	105	43	62	.410	181	241	10	-60	2018	West
17	Dallas Fuel	105	42	63	.400	176	240	13	-64	2018	East
18	Toronto Defiant	65	24	41	.369	102	151	4	-49	2019	North
19	Washington Justice	65	21	44	.323	89	152	9	-63	2019	South
20	Florida Mayhem	105	32	73	.305	152	263	12	-111	2018	West

== Midseason tournaments ==
The following listing does not include qualifying matches and is accurate as of the end of the 2021 regular season. The listing ranks the OWL teams based on their winning percentage during midseason tournament matches. The 2018 and 2019 seasons contained four and three stage playoffs (midseason tournaments), respectively, throughout the regular season. The 2020 season onwards replaced the stage playoffs with midseason tournaments.

Every team has qualified for at least one midseason tournament. The Shanghai Dragons have the most midseason tournament titles (5), the most played matches (22), won the most matches (17), and logged the most maps wins (64). The San Francisco Shock have highest map differential (+35) and highest winning percentage (.824). The New York Excelsior have logged the most map losses (39) and are tied with the Atlanta Reign for the most match losses (10). Every team has won at least one match in midseason tournaments. The Reign registered the lowest map differential (−12). The Houston Outlaws hold the distinction of having lost the most matches (5) among the teams with the lowest number of wins (1). Nine teams have registered a map tie midseason tournament history.

Key:

Best win–loss record in division

Rank	Team	App.	Titles	P	Won	Lost	Win%	MW	ML	MT	MD	Division
1	San Francisco Shock	6	3	17	14	3	.824	56	21	0	+35	West
2	Shanghai Dragons	8	5	22	17	5	.773	64	32	2	+32	East
3	Paris Eternal	3	1	8	6	2	.750	22	16	1	+6	North
4	Vancouver Titans	5	1	11	7	4	.636	28	18	0	+10	West
5	Guangzhou Charge	3	1	5	3	2	.600	14	8	0	+6	East
6	Philadelphia Fusion	5	0	12	7	5	.583	29	23	1	+6	South
7	Los Angeles Valiant	6	1	10	5	5	.500	17	23	1	-6	West
8	Dallas Fuel	8	1	16	8	8	.500	33	36	1	-3	West
9	Los Angeles Gladiators	7	1	11	5	6	.455	20	20	0	±0	West
10	New York Excelsior	11	2	18	8	10	.444	30	39	1	-9	North
11	Florida Mayhem	4	0	9	4	5	.444	18	19	1	-1	South
12	Hangzhou Spark	5	0	8	3	5	.375	11	21	0	-10	East
13	Seoul Dynasty	6	0	11	4	7	.364	19	27	0	-8	East
14	Chengdu Hunters	6	0	14	5	9	.357	28	29	0	-1	East
15	Toronto Defiant	4	0	6	2	4	.333	8	15	0	-7	North
16	Atlanta Reign	7	0	14	4	10	.286	19	31	0	-12	South
17	London Spitfire	6	1	7	2	5	.286	12	18	0	-6	North
18	Boston Uprising	3	0	4	1	3	.250	5	9	1	-4	North
19	Washington Justice	3	0	4	1	3	.250	5	10	0	-5	South
20	Houston Outlaws	5	0	6	1	5	.167	5	16	1	-11	South

== Season playoffs ==
The following listing does not include play-in tournaments and is accurate as of the end of the 2021 Overwatch League playoffs.

Key:

Best win–loss record in division

Rank	Team	App.	Last	Titles	P	Won	Lost	Win%	MW	ML	MT	MD	Division
1	San Francisco Shock	3	2021	2	16	13	3	.813	49	24	2	25	West
2	Shanghai Dragons	2	2021	1	9	7	2	.778	26	11	1	15	East
3	Vancouver Titans	1	2019	0	4	3	1	.750	12	11	0	1	West
4	London Spitfire	2	2019	1	9	6	3	.667	19	13	1	6	North
5	Atlanta Reign	3	2021	0	12	6	6	.500	24	30	1	-6	South
6	Florida Mayhem	1	2020	0	4	2	2	.500	8	6	1	2	South
6	Hangzhou Spark	1	2019	0	4	2	2	.500	11	9	0	2	East
8	Dallas Fuel	1	2021	1	4	2	2	.500	8	7	0	1	West
9	Philadelphia Fusion	3	2021	0	15	7	8	.467	27	28	0	-1	South
10	Seoul Dynasty	1	2020	0	9	4	5	.444	21	20	0	1	East
11	Washington Justice	2	2021	0	7	3	4	.429	12	13	0	-1	South
12	New York Excelsior	3	2020	0	9	3	6	.333	17	23	2	-6	North
13	Boston Uprising	1	2018	0	3	1	2	.333	5	7	0	-2	North
14	Chengdu Hunters	1	2021	0	3	1	2	.333	5	8	1	-3	East
15	Los Angeles Gladiators	4	2021	0	11	3	8	.273	15	30	0	-15	West
16	Los Angeles Valiant	2	2020	0	5	1	4	.200	5	14	1	-9	West
17	Paris Eternal	1	2020	0	2	0	2	.000	2	6	0	-4	North
18	Guangzhou Charge	1	2020	0	2	0	2	.000	0	6	0	-6	East
