= 2023 Overwatch League Grand Finals =

2023 Overwatch League championship match

2023 OWL Grand Finals
Houston Outlaws	Florida Mayhem
0	4
- Date: October 1, 2023
- Venue: Mattamy Athletic Centre, Toronto, Canada
- Purse: $1.4 million
- MVP: Choi "Mer1t" Tae-min

Live Broadcast
- Broadcast: YouTube

The 2023 Overwatch League Grand Finals was the sixth, and final, championship match of the Overwatch League (OWL), which took place on October 1, 2023. The series marked the conclusion of the 2023 Overwatch League playoffs and was played between the Houston Outlaws and the Florida Mayhem at the Mattamy Athletic Centre in Toronto, Canada.

Houston entered the season playoffs as the fifth seed and lost their opening match against the Mayhem in the group stage. They defeated the Seoul Infernal and Dallas Fuel in the groups to advance to the semifinals, where they defeated the Hangzhou Spark. Florida entered as the third seed, and after defeating the Outlaws, they defeated the Dallas Fuel to advance to the semifinals, where they defeated the Boston Uprising.

The Mayhem defeated the Outlaws by a score of 4–0 to win their first OWL championship.

== Road to the Grand Finals ==
The Grand Finals are the post-season championship series of the Overwatch League (OWL), a professional international esports league; the teams in the 2023 Grand Finals match competed for a US$1.5 million prize pool, where the winners received $1 million. The 2023 season was the sixth season in OWL history and was contested by OWL 19 teams along with Overwatch Contenders teams in the Eastern region. The playoffs were contested by eight teams – five from the league's West region and three from the league's East region.

The finalists, the Florida Mayhem and the Houston Outlaws, finished the regular season with records of 14–2 and 13–3, respectively. The Mayhem claimed entered the season playoffs as the third overall seed, while the Outlaws entered as the fifth. The defending Overwatch League champions, the Dallas Fuel were eliminated in the lower finals of the group stage of the playoffs, while the 2022 runners-up, the San Francisco Shock, failed to qualify for the 2023 playoffs after being eliminated in the West play-in tournament.

=== Houston Outlaws ===
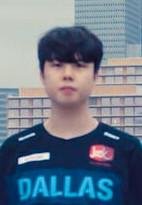
Houston tank player Lee "Fearless" Eui-seok

The Outlaws entered the Overwatch League in 2018 as one of its twelve founding franchises. Following a third-place finish in the 2022 playoffs, the Outlaws released the entirety of its roster, aside from damage player Oh "Pelican" Se-hyun. The team then picked up veterans to fill its roster, signing hitscan damage player Lee "Happy" Jung-woo, tank player Lee "Fearless" Eui-seok, and support players Kim "Shu" Jin-seo and Park "Viol2t" Min-ki. Just a week before the beginning of the preseason pro-am, the Outlaws picked up tank player Lee "Gargoyle" Beom-jun.

In the Spring Stage qualifiers, the Outlaws went 7–1, the second-best record in the Western region. Their placement qualified them for the international Midseason Madness tournament. They reached the upper bracket finals of the tournament after defeating the Seoul Infernal by a score of 3–0 in the upper bracket semifinals. The Outlaws lost their upper bracket finals match against the Atlanta Reign, 2–3, dropping them to the lower bracket finals, where they faced the Florida Mayhem. Houston defeated Florida, 3–1, to advance to the finals against the Reign. The Outlaws finished the tournament in second place, losing the Reign by a score of 1–4. At the start of the Summer Stage qualifiers, the Outlaws announced that Gargoyle had retired. The team went 6–2 throughout the qualifiers, which included a win over then undefeated Reign, giving them a regular season record of 13–3, the third best record in the West. Fearless was awarded a tank Role Star commendation at the end of the regular season.

Heading into the season playoffs, Overwatch 2 received a balance patch; notably, the tank hero Zarya received a buff. Anticipating that Zarya would be a strong hero to play in the playoffs, the Outlaws signed tank player Shin "Bernar" Se-won. In the season playoffs, the Outlaws were placed in a group with the Seoul Infernal, Florida Mayhem, and Dallas Fuel. Houston lost their opening match against the Mayhem by a score of 1–3. They went on to defeat both the Infernal and Fuel to advance past the group stage to the semifinals. In the semifinals match, the Outlaws defeated the Hangzhou Spark, 3–0, to advance to the Grand Finals.

=== Florida Mayhem ===
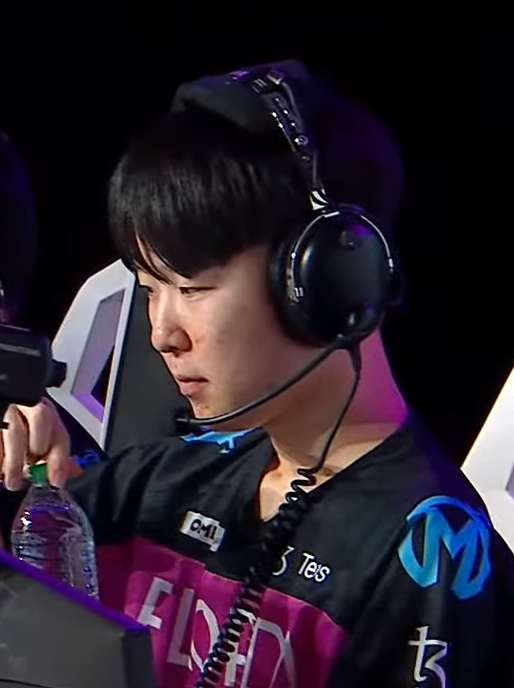
2023 MVP Ham "Someone" Jeong-wan

The Mayhem also entered the league as one of the 12 founding franchises. After finishing the 2022 season with a 12–12 record and playoff appearance, the Mayhem released four of their players, electing to retain tank Ham "Someone" Jeong-wan, DPS Baek "Checkmate" Seung-hun, and support Rupal "Rupal" Zaman. To fill their vacancies, they acquired DPS Choi "Mer1t" Tae-min from the Houston Outlaws, signed rookie DPS Paavo "Sauna" Ulmanen, and signed support Sung "Ch0r0ng" Yoo-min. The team won the league's first preseason pro-am, after defeating the Los Angeles Gladiators in the finals by a score of 4–2.

The Mayhem finished the Spring Stage qualifiers with a 6–2 record, the third-best record in the West, advancing them to the Spring Stage knockouts. After being dropped to the lower bracket by the Gladiators in their first match of the knockouts, the Mayhem went on to defeat the Gladiators in the lower bracket finals and advanced to the Midseason Madness tournament. In the tournament, the Mayhem reached the lower bracket finals but lost there to the Outlaws by a score of 1–3. At the start of the Summer Stage, the Mayhem released Sauna and signed support Oh "Maka" Eun-seok. The Mayhem went a perfect 8–0 in the Summer Stage qualifiers, bringing their overall record to 14–2 for the season, tied for first with the Reign, but finished second in the West due to map differential. Tank Someone received multiple accolades at the end of the regular season, being commentated as a Role Star, being awarded the Dennis Hawelka Award, and earning the Most Valuable Player award. Head coach Jordan "Gunba" Graham was also named the coach of year.

With a balance patch going into effect just before start of the playoffs, the Mayhem signed DPS Lee "WhoRU" Seung-jun, a player known for their play on Genji. In the season playoffs, the Mayhem were placed in a group with the Seoul Infernal, Houston Outlaws, and Dallas Fuel. Florida won their opening match against the Outlaws by a score of 3–1. The team then defeated the Fuel to advance to the semifinals. The Mayhem advanced to the Grand Finals after defeating Boston Uprising by a score of 3–1 in the semifinals.

=== Summary of results ===
Qualified playoff teams
Seed	Team	Region	Qualification
1	Atlanta Reign	West	Regular season standings
2	Seoul Infernal	East	Regular season standings
3	Florida Mayhem	West	Regular season standings
4	London Spitfire	West	Play-in tournament
5	Houston Outlaws	West	Regular season standings
6	Boston Uprising	West	Play-in tournament
7	Dallas Fuel	East	Play-in tournament
8	Hangzhou Spark	East	Regular season standings

Houston Outlaws playoffs matches
Round	Opponent	Score
Group stage first round	(3) Florida Mayhem	1–3
Group stage lower first round	(2) Seoul Infernal	3–0
Group stage lower final	(7) Dallas Fuel	3–0
Semifinals	(8) Hangzhou Spark	3–0

Florida Mayhem playoffs matches
Round	Opponent	Score
Group stage first round	(5) Houston Outlaws	3–1
Group stage upper final	(7) Dallas Fuel	3–0
Semifinals	(6) Boston Uprising	3–1

== Venue and ticketing ==
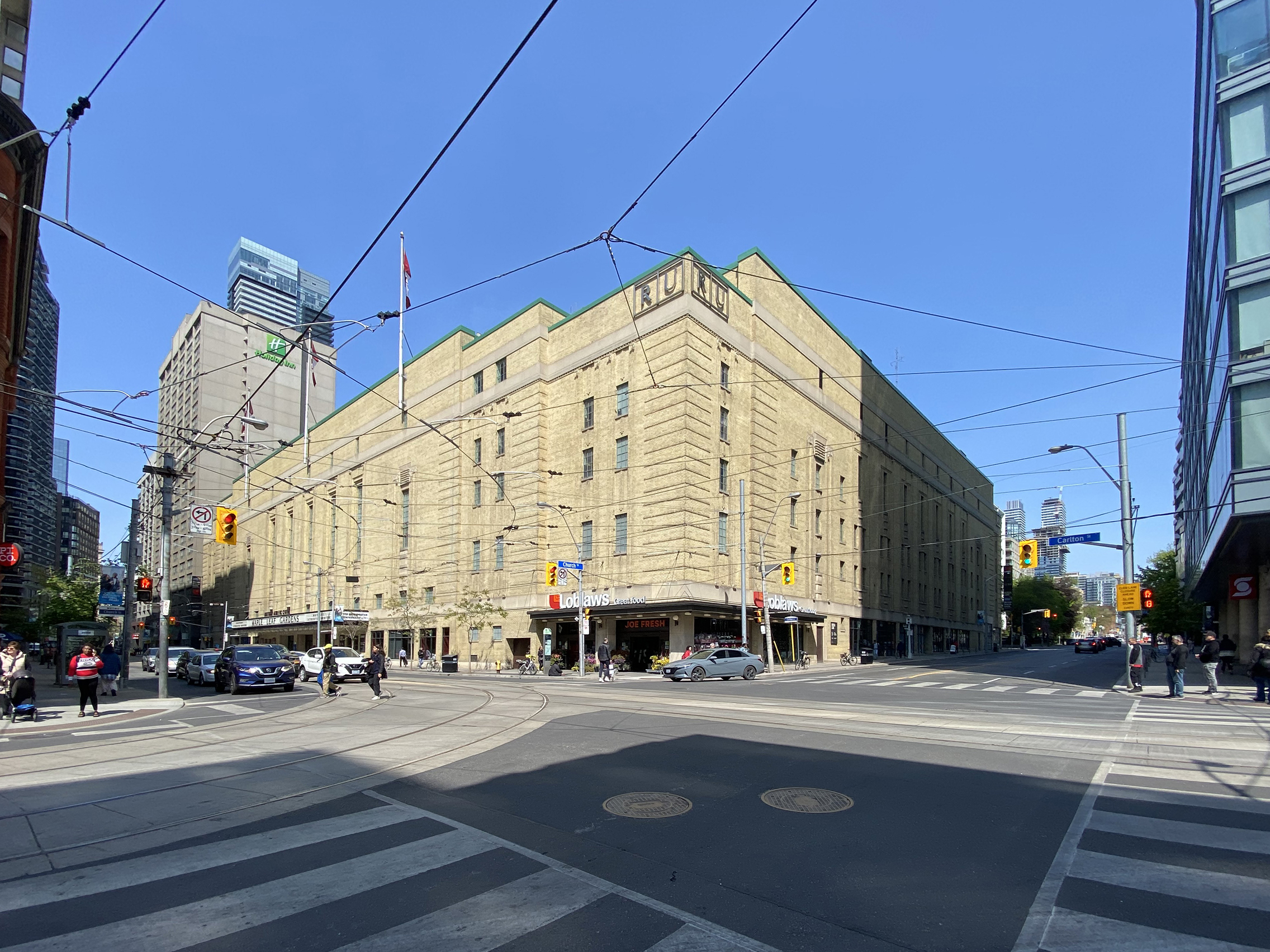
The 2023 playoffs were played at the Mattamy Athletic Centre, also known as Maple Leaf Gardens.

The Mattamy Athletic Centre in Toronto, Canada, was announced as the host venue for the 2023 OWL Grand Finals on July 15, 2022. It was the first time that the Grand Finals were held live outside of the United States. The location had been chosen in conjunction with a sponsorship deal made between the Overwatch League and the Toronto Defiant, wherein the Defiant had agreed to host the event.

The Maple Leaf Gardens, now also known as the Mattamy Athletic Centre, first opened in 1931 as an indoor arena to host Toronto Maple Leafs ice hockey games. For decades after opening, the Maple Leaf Gardens had been Canada's largest indoor venue for cultural, political, and religious events. Aside from ice hockey, the venue had hosted many other events, including a 1932 speech given by Winston Churchill, two 1964 shows from The Beatles during Beatlemania, and the 1966 boxing match between Muhammad Ali vs. George Chuvalo. The venue also hosted Overwatch League events in the past, including the 2022 Summer Showdown. Its arena has a seating capacity of 2,549 seats on its arena level and 1,000 seats in its multi-purpose court.

Tickets for Grand Finals went on sale starting July 21, 2023, and subsequently sold out.

== Broadcast ==
The Grand Finals match was live-streamed on YouTube. Overwatch players who watched the live broadcast of the playoffs and Grand Finals could earn "viewership rewards," including an in-game currency that allowed them to purchase in-game cosmetics, twelve Overwatch League-themed skins, battle pass tier skips, and other cosmetics.

Prior to the start of the championship final, Overwatch game director Aaron Keller and executive producer Jared Neuss showcased the game's upcoming new map, Samoa. A showmatch between analysts, casters, content creators, and Canadian OWL players took place to feature the new map.

At the conclusion of the Grand Finals, Overwatch League host Soe Gschwind delivered a message on broadcast reflecting on the 2023 season and the uncertainty surrounding the league's future. At the end of the 2023 OWL season, team owners will vote on whether to accept an updated operating agreement. A vote against the new agreement could potentially lead to the end of the league, resulting in a $114 million termination fee for Activision-Blizzard. In her address, Gschwind stated, "The 2023 season has come to an end, and we can now look back on six years filled with memorable moments. This was more than just a show; it was a shared dream that brought together people from different countries, languages, and backgrounds. It was the hard work and commitment of everyone involved that consistently delivered the best experience for both teams and fans, and that is truly remarkable." As Gschwind continued to speak, both she and the Overwatch League team appeared emotional at the prospect of the league's potential end. She concluded with a thank you to the fans for their support.

== Match summary ==
Grand Finals	October 1	Houston Outlaws	0	–	4	Florida Mayhem	Toronto, CA
	6:30 pm EDT	Details					Mattamy Athletic Centre
		1	Antarctic Peninsula			2	
		2	Blizzard World			3	
		2	Suravasa			3	
		0	Esperança			1	

== Rosters ==
=== Houston Outlaws ===
2023 Houston Outlaws roster
Players
Coaches

Role	No.	Handle	Name	Nationality
Damage	24	Happy	Lee Jung-woo	South Korea
Damage	75	Pelican	Oh Se-hyun	South Korea
Tank	8	Fearless	Lee Eui-seok	South Korea
Tank		BERNAR	Shin Se-won	South Korea
Support	17	Viol2t	Park Min-ki	South Korea
Support	1	Shu	Kim Jin-seo	South Korea

Head coach

- Park "Neko" Se-hyeon

Legend:
- (I) Inactive
- (S) Suspended
- (2W) Two-way player
- Substitute
- (injured) Injury / Illness

Latest roster transaction: September 25, 2023.

=== Florida Mayhem ===
2023 Florida Mayhem roster
Players
Coaches

Role	No.	Handle	Name	Nationality
Damage	2	MER1T	Choi Tae-min	South Korea
Damage	4	Checkmate	Baek Seung-hun	South Korea
Damage		WhoRU	Lee Seung-jun	South Korea
Tank	24	SOMEONE	Ham Jeong-wan	South Korea
Support	12	CH0R0NG	Sung Yoo-min	South Korea
Support	37	Rupal	Zaman, Rupal	United States
Support	10	MAKA	Oh Eun-seok	South Korea

Head coach

- Jordan "Gunba" Graham

Assistant coach(es)

- Caleb "McGravy" McGarvey

Legend:
- (I) Inactive
- (S) Suspended
- (2W) Two-way player
- Substitute
- (injured) Injury / Illness

Latest roster transaction: September 19, 2023.
