= 2023 Overwatch League playoffs =

2023 Overwatch League Playoffs

Tournament information
- Game: Overwatch
- Dates: September 28–October 1, 2023
- Administrator: Activision-Blizzard
- Venue: Mattamy Athletic Centre; Toronto, Canada
- Teams: 8
- Purse: $1,855,000

Tournament statistics
- Matches played: 14

Grand Finals
- Dates: October 1
- Champion: Florida Mayhem
- Runner-up: Houston Outlaws
- Finals MVP: Choi "Mer1t" Tae-min

The 2023 Overwatch League playoffs were the postseason tournament of the 2023 Overwatch League regular season. The tournament began on September 28 and concluded with the 2023 Grand Finals, the sixth championship match of the Overwatch League (OWL), on October 1. Eight teams contested the OWL playoffs, beginning with two four-team double-elimination tournaments leading into a four-team single-elimination tournament. All playoff matches took place at the Mattamy Athletic Centre in Toronto, Canada.

The defending OWL champions were the Dallas Fuel, who won the title against the San Francisco Shock in the 2022 OWL Grand Finals.

== Format ==
Eight teams qualified for the season playoffs. In the league's West region, five teams qualified: the top three teams based on the Western regular season standings and the top two teams from the Western play-in tournament. In the league's East region, three teams qualified: the top two teams based on the Eastern regular season standings and the top team from the Eastern play-in tournament.

The playoffs were divided into two phases. It started with two four-team double-elimination tournaments. The top two teams from each group then moved on to a four-team single-elimination Grand Finals bracket, which culminated in the Grand Finals. The composition of the groups was determined through a draft process, during which top-seeded teams selected their opponents for the opposing bracket. Teams continued to select their opponents until all teams were accounted for. Teams were seeded based on the order of these selections. Except for the Grand Finals match, all other matches adhered to a best-of-five series format, while the finals were played as a best-of-seven series.

== Venue ==
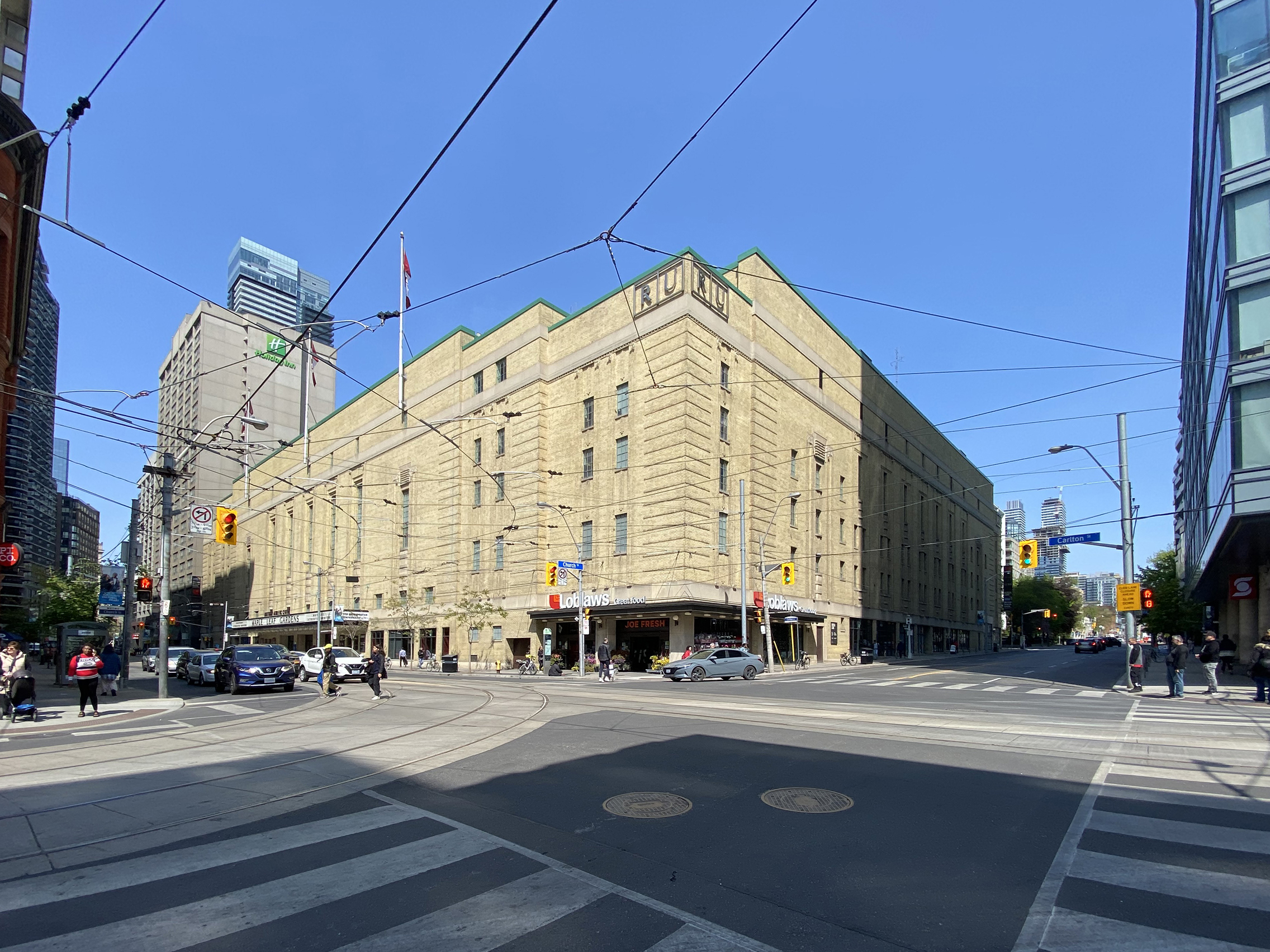
The 2023 playoffs were played at the Mattamy Athletic Centre, also known as Maple Leaf Gardens.

All playoff matches were played at the Mattamy Athletic Centre in Toronto, Canada. The venue also hosted the OWL 2022 Summer Showdown. The location was chosen in conjunction with a deal made between the Overwatch League and the Toronto Defiant, wherein the Defiant had agreed to host the event. It was the first time that the Grand Finals were held outside of the United States.

== Participants ==
Seed	Team	Region	Qualification
1	Atlanta Reign	West	Regular season standings
2	Seoul Infernal	East	Regular season standings
3	Florida Mayhem	West	Regular season standings
4	London Spitfire	West	Play-in tournament
5	Houston Outlaws	West	Regular season standings
6	Boston Uprising	West	Play-in tournament
7	Dallas Fuel	East	Play-in tournament
8	Hangzhou Spark	East	Regular season standings

== Bracket ==
Bracket A

Upper round 1
September 28
1	Atlanta Reign	2
4	Hangzhou Spark	3
September 28
2	London Spitfire	1
3	Boston Uprising	3
Lower round 1
September 29
1	Atlanta Reign	0
2	London Spitfire	3

Upper final
September 29
4	Hangzhou Spark	3
3	Boston Uprising	2
Lower final
September 30
3	Boston Uprising	3
2	London Spitfire	1

Advance to Grand Finals Bracket
A1	Hangzhou Spark
A2	Boston Uprising

Bracket B

Upper round 1
September 28
1	Seoul Infernal	0
4	Dallas Fuel	3
September 28
2	Florida Mayhem	3
3	Houston Outlaws	1
Lower round 1
September 29
1	Seoul Infernal	0
3	Houston Outlaws	3

Upper final
September 29
4	Dallas Fuel	0
2	Florida Mayhem	3
Lower final
September 30
4	Dallas Fuel	0
3	Houston Outlaws	3

Advance to Grand Finals Bracket
B1	Florida Mayhem
B2	Houston Outlaws

Grand Finals bracket

Semifinals
October 1
A1	Hangzhou Spark	0
B2	Houston Outlaws	3
October 1
B1	Florida Mayhem	3
A2	Boston Uprising	1

Grand Final
October 1
B2	Houston Outlaws	0
B1	Florida Mayhem	4
Third place
October 1
A1	Hangzhou Spark	3
A2	Boston Uprising	0

== Matches ==
Upper round 1A	September 28	Hangzhou Spark	3	–	2	Atlanta Reign	Toronto, CA
	1:00 pm EDT	Details					Mattamy Athletic Centre
		1	Ilios			2	
		1	Midtown			2	
		3	Suravasa			2	
		1	Esperança			0	
		3	Route 66			2	

Upper round 1B	September 28	Dallas Fuel	3	–	0	Seoul Infernal	Toronto, CA
	3:30 pm EDT	Details					Mattamy Athletic Centre
		2	Busan			0	
		3	Blizzard World			2	
		3	New Junk City			0	

Upper round 1A	September 28	Boston Uprising	3	–	1	London Spitfire	Toronto, CA
	4:45 pm EDT	Details					Mattamy Athletic Centre
		1	Lijiang Tower			2	
		2	King's Row			1	
		3	New Junk City			2	
		1	New Queen Street			0	

Upper round 1B	September 28	Houston Outlaws	1	–	3	Florida Mayhem	Toronto, CA
	6:30 pm EDT	Details					Mattamy Athletic Centre
		2	Lijiang Tower			0	
		1	Midtown			2	
		2	New Junk City			3	
		0	New Queen Street			1	

Lower round 1A	September 29	London Spitfire	3	–	0	Atlanta Reign	Toronto, CA
	1:00 pm EDT	Details					Mattamy Athletic Centre
		2	Ilios			1	
		3	Blizzard World			2	
		3	Suravasa			0	

Lower round 1B	September 29	Houston Outlaws	3	–	0	Seoul Infernal	Toronto, CA
	2:30 pm EDT	Details					Mattamy Athletic Centre
		2	Ilios			1	
		2	Blizzard World			1	
		3	Suravasa			2	

Upper final A	September 29	Hangzhou Spark	3	–	2	Boston Uprising	Toronto, CA
	4:00 pm EDT	Details					Mattamy Athletic Centre
		0	Lijiang Tower			2	
		2	King's Row			3	
		3	Suravasa			3	
		1	New Queen Street			1	
		2	Route 66			2	

Upper final B	September 29	Dallas Fuel	0	–	3	Florida Mayhem	Toronto, CA
	6:00 pm EDT	Details					Mattamy Athletic Centre
		0	Lijiang Tower			2	
		1	King's Row			2	
		1	Suravasa			3	

Lower final A	September 30	London Spitfire	1	–	3	Boston Uprising	Toronto, CA
	1:00 pm EDT	Details					Mattamy Athletic Centre
		0	Lijiang Tower			2	
		3	Blizzard World			2	
		1	Suravasa			3	
		0	Esperança			1	

Lower final B	September 30	Houston Outlaws	3	–	0	Dallas Fuel	Toronto, CA
	2:45 pm EDT	Details					Mattamy Athletic Centre
		2	Lijiang Tower			0	
		2	King's Row			0	
		3	Suravasa			2	

Semifinals	October 1	Houston Outlaws	3	–	0	Hangzhou Spark	Toronto, CA
	1:00 pm EDT	Details					Mattamy Athletic Centre
		2	Busan			1	
		6	King's Row			5	
		3	Suravasa			0	

Semifinals	October 1	Boston Uprising	1	–	3	Florida Mayhem	Toronto, CA
	2:30 pm EDT	Details					Mattamy Athletic Centre
		0	Busan			2	
		2	Midtown			1	
		2	New Junk City			3	
		0	Colosseo			1	

Third place match	October 1	Hangzhou Spark	3	–	0	Boston Uprising	Toronto, CA
	5:00 pm EDT	Details					Mattamy Athletic Centre
		2	Ilios			0	
		1	Midtown			0	
		3	New Junk City			1	

Grand Final	October 1	Houston Outlaws	0	–	4	Florida Mayhem	Toronto, CA
	6:30 pm EDT	Details					Mattamy Athletic Centre
		1	Antarctic Peninsula			2	
		2	Blizzard World			3	
		2	Suravasa			3	
		0	Esperança			1	

== Winnings ==
Teams in the season playoffs will compete for a total prize pool of US$1,855,000, with the payout division detailed below.

Pos	Team	Bonus
1	Florida Mayhem	$1,000,000
2	Houston Outlaws	$400,000
3	Hangzhou Spark	$225,000
4	Boston Uprising	$130,000
5–6	Dallas Fuel	$50,000
5–6	London Spitfire	$50,000
7–8	Atlanta Reign	–
7–8	Seoul Infernal	–
