= List of Chengdu Hunters players =

The Chengdu Hunters are a Chinese esports team founded in 2018 that compete in the Overwatch League (OWL). The Hunters began playing competitive Overwatch in the 2019 season.

All rostered players during the OWL season (including the playoffs) are included, even if they did not make an appearance.

== All-time roster ==
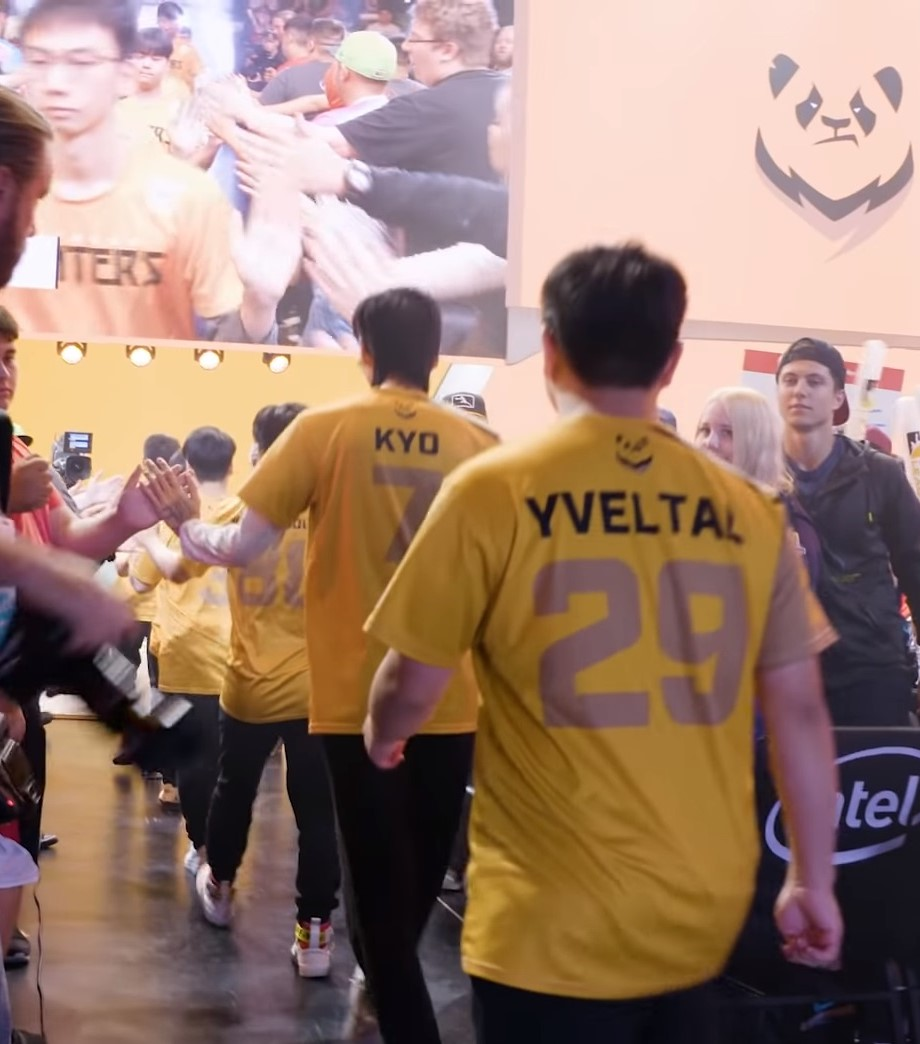
Kong "Kyo" Chunting and Li "Yveltal" Xianyao walking to the stage for a match in 2019.

As of December 14, 2021

Handle	Name	Role	Country	Seasons	Ref.
Ameng	Menghan Ding	Tank	China	2019–2021	
ATing	Shaohua Chen	Tank	Taiwan	2020	
Baconjack	Tzu-Heng Lo	Damage	Taiwan	2019–2020	
Elsa	Wenjie Luo	Tank	China	2019–2021	
Farway1987	Jiale Cao	Support	China	2021–present	
GA9A	Jiaxin Qiu	Tank	China	2021–present	
Garry	Li Guan	Support	China	2019	
Jimmy	Yujia Lei	Damage	China	2021–present	
JinMu	Hu Yi	Damage	China	2019–present	
Jiqiren	Yansong Wei	Tank	China	2019	
Kaneki	Nian Liu	Damage	China	2021	
Kyo	Chunting Kong	Support	China	2019–2020	
LateYoung	Tianbin Ma	Tank	China	2019–2021	
Leave	Xin Huang	Damage	China	2020–present	
Lengsa	Jingyi Chen	Support	Taiwan	2020	
Mmonk	Xiang Zhou	Support	China	2021–present	
Molly	Chengzhi He	Support	China	2020	
Nisha	Li Tan	Support	China	2021–present	
TAROCOOK1E	Zhong Yunlong	Damage	China	2021–present	
YangXiaoLong	Zhihao Zhang	Damage	China	2019	
Yveltal	Xianyao Li	Support	China	2019–present	
