= 2022 Overwatch League playoffs =

Postseason tournament of the 2022

2022 Overwatch League Playoffs

Tournament information
- Game: Overwatch
- Dates: October 30–November 4, 2022
- Administrator: Activision-Blizzard
- Venue: Anaheim Convention Center; Anaheim, California
- Teams: 12
- Purse: $2,550,000

Tournament statistics
- Matches played: 22

Grand Finals
- Dates: November 4
- Champion: Dallas Fuel
- Runner-up: San Francisco Shock
- Finals MVP: Lee "Fearless" Eui-seok

The 2022 Overwatch League playoffs was the postseason tournament of the 2022 Overwatch League regular season. The tournament began on October 30 and concluded with the 2022 Grand Finals, the fifth championship match of the Overwatch League (OWL), on November 4. Twelve teams contested the OWL playoffs, a double-elimination tournament, with the final two teams remaining in the tournament advancing to the Grand Finals. All playoff matches will take place at the Anaheim Convention Center in Anaheim, California.

The defending OWL champions were the Shanghai Dragons, who won the title against the Atlanta Reign in the 2021 OWL Grand Finals. The Dallas Fuel defeated the San Francisco Shock in the Grand Finals by a score of 4–3 to win their first OWL championship.

== Format ==
Twelve teams qualified for the season playoffs. In the league's West region, eight teams qualified: the top six teams based on the Western regular season standings and the top two teams from the Western play-in tournament. In the league's East region, four teams qualified: the top three teams based on the Eastern regular season standings and the top team from the Eastern play-in tournament. All teams were seeded into the playoffs based on their overall league points earned throughout the regular season. Any ties in league points were broken by the league's tiebreaking rules.

The playoffs were a double-elimination tournament. The top four seeds received a bye to the second round of the upper bracket, and of those, the top three selected their opponent for those matches. The remaining teams started in the first round of the upper bracket. In each match, the higher-seeded team had the choice of which map to play first from a pool of maps. Each following map was chosen by the losing team from the previous map. The winner of each was determined by which team won three maps first, aside from the Grand Finals, which was first-to-four.

== Venue ==
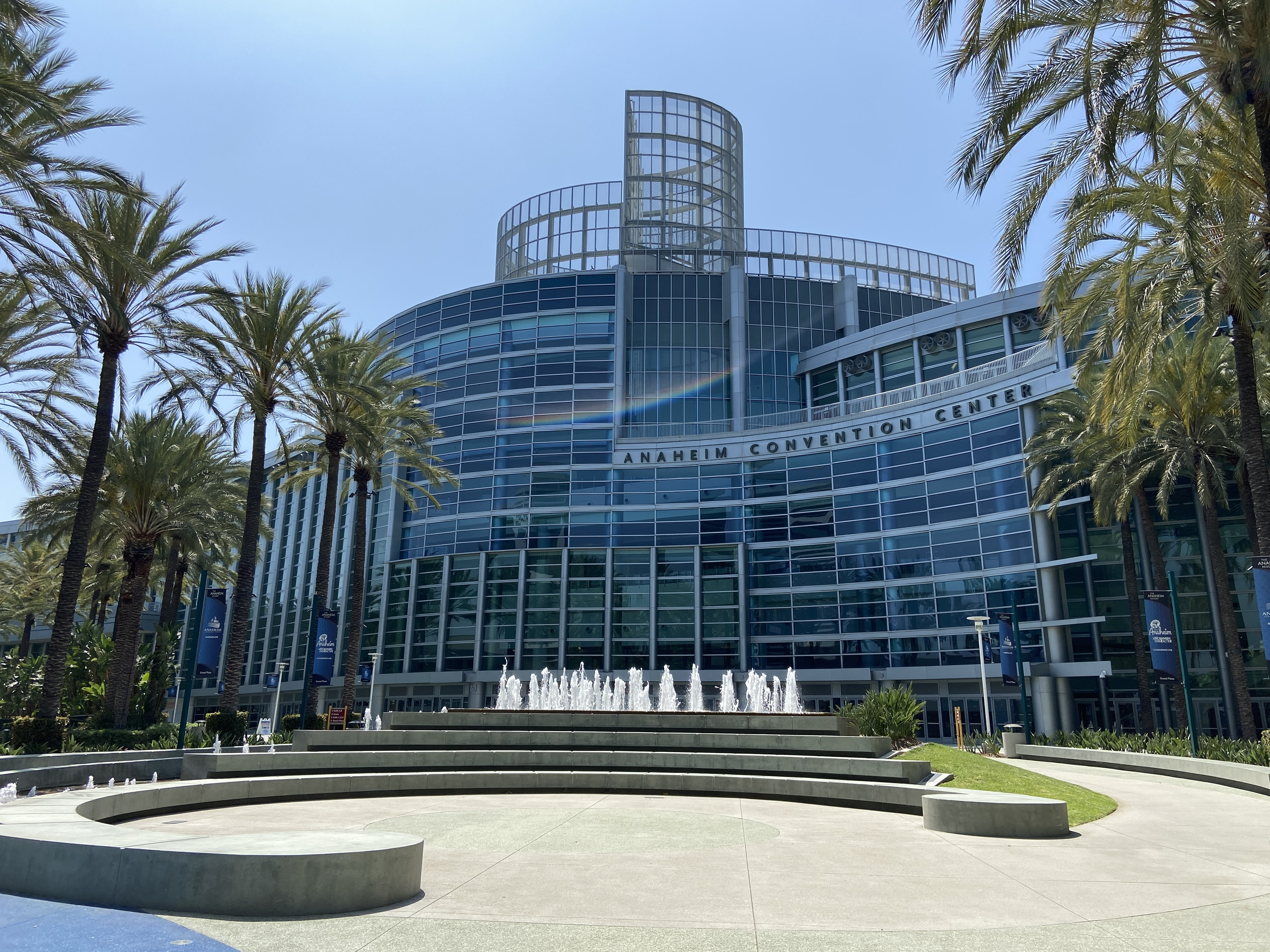
The 2022 playoffs will be played at the Anaheim Convention Center.

All matches were played at the Anaheim Convention Center in Anaheim, California. It was the first time that the OWL has held live playoff matches since the 2019 Grand Finals in Philadelphia.

== Participants ==
Seed	Team	Region	Points	Record	MR	MD
1	Dallas Fuel	West	26	20–4	61–26–0	+35
2	San Francisco Shock	West	26	20–4	65–27–0	+38
3	Los Angeles Gladiators	West	25	18–6	64–29–0	+35
4	Seoul Dynasty	East	25	19–5	62–24–0	+38
5	Shanghai Dragons	East	23	18–6	57–30–0	+27
6	Houston Outlaws	West	19	16–8	56–42–0	+14
7	Atlanta Reign	West	16	13–11	51–42–0	+9
8	London Spitfire	West	16	14–10	50–41–0	+9
9	Philadelphia Fusion	East	15	11–13	50–50–0	±0
10	Florida Mayhem	West	15	12–12	46–45–0	+1
11	Toronto Defiant	West	15	12–12	48–49–0	-1
12	Hangzhou Spark	East	13	11–13	46–49–0	-3

== Bracket ==
Upper round 1 October 30	Upper round 2 October 31	Upper round 3 November 2	Upper final November 3	Grand Finals; November 4
1	Dallas Fuel	3
8	London Spitfire	3	12	Hangzhou Spark	1
1	Dallas Fuel	3
9	Philadelphia Fusion	0
4	Seoul Dynasty	0
4	Seoul Dynasty	3
5	Shanghai Dragons	0	10	Florida Mayhem	0
1	Dallas Fuel	3
12	Hangzhou Spark	3
6	Houston Outlaws	1
2	San Francisco Shock	2
7	Atlanta Reign	0	6	Houston Outlaws	3
6	Houston Outlaws	3
10	Florida Mayhem	3
8	London Spitfire	0
3	Los Angeles Gladiators	1
6	Houston Outlaws	3	8	London Spitfire	3
11	Toronto Defiant	0	1	Dallas Fuel	4
2	San Francisco Shock	3
Lower round 1 November 1	Lower round 2 November 2	Lower round 3 November 3	Lower round 4 November 3	Lower final November 4
3	Los Angeles Gladiators	3
4	Seoul Dynasty	0
9	Philadelphia Fusion	1
3	Los Angeles Gladiators	1	2	San Francisco Shock	3
2	San Francisco Shock	3	6	Houston Outlaws	0
2	San Francisco Shock	3
2	San Francisco Shock	3	2	San Francisco Shock	3
5	Shanghai Dragons	1
12	Hangzhou Spark	1
10	Florida Mayhem	3
8	London Spitfire	1
7	Atlanta Reign	1
10	Florida Mayhem	1	12	Hangzhou Spark	3
12	Hangzhou Spark	3
12	Hangzhou Spark	3
11	Toronto Defiant	2

== Matches ==
Upper round 1	October 30	Philadelphia Fusion	0	–	3	London Spitfire	Anaheim, CA
	2:30 pm PDT	Details					Anaheim Convention Center
		0	Lijiang Tower			2	
		2	Eichenwalde			3	
		2	Route 66			3	

Upper round 1	October 30	Hangzhou Spark	3	–	0	Shanghai Dragons	Anaheim, CA
	4:00 pm PDT	Details					Anaheim Convention Center
		2	Oasis			0	
		3	King's Row			2	
		4	Route 66			3	

Upper round 1	October 30	Florida Mayhem	3	–	0	Atlanta Reign	Anaheim, CA
	5:30 pm PDT	Details					Anaheim Convention Center
		2	Lijiang Tower			0	
		3	King's Row			2	
		4	Junkertown			3	

Upper round 1	October 30	Toronto Defiant	0	–	3	Houston Outlaws	Anaheim, CA
	7:00 pm PDT	Details					Anaheim Convention Center
		0	Busan			2	
		4	Paraíso			5	
		2	Dorado			3	

Upper round 2	October 31	Hangzhou Spark	1	–	3	Dallas Fuel	Anaheim, CA
	2:30 pm PDT	Details					Anaheim Convention Center
		1	Lijiang Tower			2	
		4	Paraíso			3	
		1	Dorado			3	
		0	Esperança			1	

Upper round 2	October 31	Florida Mayhem	0	–	3	Seoul Dynasty	Anaheim, CA
	4:00 pm PDT	Details					Anaheim Convention Center
		1	Ilios			2	
		1	Eichenwalde			2	
		2	Junkertown			3	

Upper round 2	October 31	Houston Outlaws	3	–	2	San Francisco Shock	Anaheim, CA
	5:30 pm PDT	Details					Anaheim Convention Center
		2	Ilios			0	
		4	King's Row			5	
		3	Route 66			0	
		0	Esperança			1	
		2	Busan			1	

Upper round 2	October 31	London Spitfire	3	–	1	Los Angeles Gladiators	Anaheim, CA
	7:00 pm PDT	Details					Anaheim Convention Center
		1	Lijiang Tower			2	
		3	Eichenwalde			2	
		3	Dorado			2	
		1	Colosseo			0	

Lower round 1	November 1	Philadelphia Fusion	1	–	3	Los Angeles Gladiators	Anaheim, CA
	2:30 pm PDT	Details					Anaheim Convention Center
		2	Oasis			0	
		2	King's Row			3	
		2	Route 66			3	
		0	Esperança			1	

Lower round 1	November 1	Shanghai Dragons	1	–	3	San Francisco Shock	Anaheim, CA
	4:00 pm PDT	Details					Anaheim Convention Center
		1	Lijiang Tower			2	
		2	Eichenwalde			1	
		2	Circuit Royal			3	
		0	Esperança			1	

Lower round 1	November 1	Atlanta Reign	1	–	3	Florida Mayhem	Anaheim, CA
	5:30 pm PDT	Details					Anaheim Convention Center
		2	Ilios			0	
		0	Eichenwalde			1	
		1	Route 66			2	
		0	Esperança			1	

Lower round 1	November 1	Toronto Defiant	2	–	3	Hangzhou Spark	Anaheim, CA
	7:00 pm PDT	Details					Anaheim Convention Center
		0	Oasis			2	
		3	Paraíso			2	
		2	Route 66			3	
		1	Esperança			0	
		0	Lijiang Tower			2	

Lower round 2	November 2	Los Angeles Gladiators	1	–	3	San Francisco Shock	Anaheim, CA
	2:30 pm PDT	Details					Anaheim Convention Center
		0	Oasis			2	
		4	King's Row			3	
		2	Circuit Royal			3	
		0	Esperança			1	

Lower round 2	November 2	Hangzhou Spark	3	–	1	Florida Mayhem	Anaheim, CA
	4:00 pm PDT	Details					Anaheim Convention Center
		1	Busan			2	
		3	Paraíso			2	
		3	Dorado			2	
		1	Esperança			0	

Upper round 2	November 2	Seoul Dynasty	0	–	3	Dallas Fuel	Anaheim, CA
	5:30 pm PDT	Details					Anaheim Convention Center
		1	Nepal			2	
		1	King's Row			2	
		2	Dorado			3	

Upper round 2	November 2	London Spitfire	0	–	3	Houston Outlaws	Anaheim, CA
	7:00 pm PDT	Details					Anaheim Convention Center
		1	Ilios			2	
		1	Eichenwalde			3	
		1	Circuit Royal			3	

Lower round 3	November 3	San Francisco Shock	3	–	0	Seoul Dynasty	Anaheim, CA
	2:30 pm PDT	Details					Anaheim Convention Center
		2	Lijiang Tower			1	
		3	Paraíso			1	
		2	Dorado			1	

Lower round 3	November 3	Hangzhou Spark	3	–	1	London Spitfire	Anaheim, CA
	4:00 pm PDT						Anaheim Convention Center
		2	Lijiang Tower			1	
		2	King's Row			3	
		4	Route 66			3	
		1	Colosseo			0	

Upper final	November 3	Houston Outlaws	1	–	3	Dallas Fuel	Anaheim, CA
	5:30 pm PDT	Details					Anaheim Convention Center
		2	Nepal			1	
		1	King's Row			2	
		1	Route 66			2	
		0	Colosseo			1	

Lower round 4	November 3	Hangzhou Spark	1	–	3	San Francisco Shock	Anaheim, CA
	7:00 pm PDT	Details					Anaheim Convention Center
		1	Oasis			2	
		4	King's Row			3	
		3	Circuit Royal			4	
		0	Colosseo			1	

Lower final	November 4	San Francisco Shock	3	–	0	Houston Outlaws	Anaheim, CA
	5:00 pm PDT	Details					Anaheim Convention Center
		2	Nepal			0	
		3	King's Row			1	
		2	Route 66			1	

Grand Final	November 4	San Francisco Shock	3	–	4	Dallas Fuel	Anaheim, CA
	7:00 pm PDT	Details					Anaheim Convention Center
		1	Lijiang Tower			2	
		2	King's Row			1	
		3	Dorado			2	
		0	Esperança			1	
		2	Oasis			1	
		1	Route 66			2	
		0	Colosseo			1	

== Winnings ==
Teams in the season playoffs competed for a total prize pool of US$2.55 million, with the payout division detailed below.

Pos	Team	Bonus
1	Dallas Fuel	$1,000,000
2	San Francisco Shock	$500,000
3	Houston Outlaws	$350,000
4	Hangzhou Spark	$250,000
5–6	London Spitfire	$100,000
5–6	Seoul Dynasty	$100,000
7–8	Florida Mayhem	$55,000
7–8	Los Angeles Gladiators	$55,000
9–12	Atlanta Reign	$35,000
9–12	Philadelphia Fusion	$35,000
9–12	Shanghai Dragons	$35,000
9–12	Toronto Defiant	$35,000
