= Atlanta Reign =

American professional esports team

- Founded: August 2, 2018
- Disbanded: November 10, 2023
- League: Overwatch League
- Region: West
- Team history: Atlanta Reign; 2018–2023
- Location: 1290 Collier Rd. Atlanta, Georgia, U.S.
- Colors
- Owner: Atlanta Esports Ventures
- General manager: Paul Hamilton
- Affiliation: ATL Academy
- Main sponsor: Cox Communications
- Website: Official website

Uniforms

The Atlanta Reign were an American professional Overwatch esports team based in Atlanta, Georgia. The team competed in the Overwatch League (OWL) as a member of the league's West region. Founded in 2018 by Atlanta Esports Ventures, a joint venture between Cox Enterprises and Province, Inc., Atlanta Reign was established as one of the expansion teams for the OWL's 2019 season. They became the first esports team to officially represent the city of Atlanta. The team's ownership also extended to ATL Academy, a former academy team that competed in Overwatch Contenders, the developmental league for the Overwatch League.

From their debut in the 2019 season until 2023, the Reign were led by head coach Brad "Sephy" Rajani. The team reached the season playoffs in every season of their existence. Their best season came in 2021 when they advanced to the Grand Finals, the championship event of the Overwatch League. However, the Reign fell short in the Grand Finals, losing to the Shanghai Dragons.

== Franchise history ==
On August 2, 2018, Atlanta Esports Ventures, a collaboration between Cox Enterprises and Province, Inc, acquired one of the expansion slots in the Overwatch League from Activision Blizzard. The purchase price was estimated to be between $30 million and $60 million. This acquisition had been a targeted goal for Activision Blizzard, with Pete Vlastlica, the president and CEO of Activision Blizzard Esports Leagues, expressing their long-standing interest in Atlanta. As a result, the Atlanta Reign became the first official esports team representing the city of Atlanta.

Atlanta Reign hired Brad "Sephy" Rajani, the former head coach of the San Francisco Shock, as their first head coach. In late October 2018, the team announced their complete roster consisting of eight players. None of the players had previously competed in the Overwatch League; instead, the team sought talent from various Overwatch Contenders scenes. The roster included Jeong "Erster" Jun as the damage player, Blake "Gator" Scott and Park "Pokpo" Hyeon-jun as tank players, and Petja "Masaa" Kantanen as the support player. Additionally, the team signed Dusttin "Dogman" Bowerman as a free agent to bolster their support lineup. The team later signed controversial streamer Daniel "Dafran" Francesca to their roster.

The Atlanta Reign's first regular season match in the Overwatch League resulted in a decisive 4–0 victory over the Florida Mayhem on February 15, 2019. This initial success helped propel them to finish Stage 1 with a 4–3 record, securing a spot in the Stage 1 playoffs. However, the team faced defeat in the quarterfinals against the Philadelphia Fusion. Prior to the start of Stage 2, on March 28, 2019, Dafran announced his retirement. In response, the Reign made roster adjustments, including the acquisition of Andrej "Babybay" Francisty from the San Francisco Shock. Despite struggling in Stages 2 and 3 with a combined 5–9 record and no stage playoff appearances, the team found their stride in Stage 4 with a perfect 7–0 record after the implementation of the 2–2–2 role lock. With a 16–12 overall record, the Reign secured the sixth seed in the season playoffs. In their first playoff match, they achieved a 4–3 upset victory over the San Francisco Shock. However, they were defeated 2–4 by the New York Excelsior in the following match, relegating them to the lower bracket. The Reign's playoff run concluded with a 0–4 loss to the Hangzhou Spark in their next match.

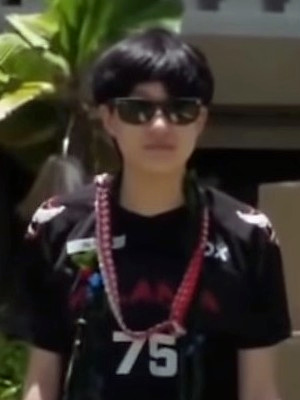
Oh "Pelican" Se-hyun was named the 2021 OWL Rookie of the Year.

Prior to the start of the 2020 season, the Atlanta Reign made changes to their roster. They released three players and signed five new players. Among the signings were tank player Xander "Hawk" Domecq and damage player Kim "Edison" Tae-Hoon. These signings brought the total number of players on the roster to twelve. Throughout the season, the team achieved mixed results. They advanced past the knockouts in all three midseason tournament cycles but fell in the quarterfinals each time. In July, the Reign experienced the retirement of Babybay and the signing of support player Kim "Ir1s" Seung-Hyun. They finished the regular season in 12th place with a 10–11 record. However, in the North America play-in tournament, they defeated the Boston Uprising, 3–1, to secure a spot in the season playoffs. Their first match in the playoffs was a 3–2 victory over the Paris Eternal. They were later defeated by the Shock, 1–3, in the following round, moving Atlanta to the lower bracket. Their playoff run came to an end on September 11 with a 0–3 loss to the Florida Mayhem, resulting in their elimination from the playoffs.

After a season filled with player substitutions, the Atlanta Reign made significant changes to their roster. They decided to drop a majority of their players, retaining only Edison, Gator, Hawk, Masaa, and Ir1s. The team then signed two new damage players: rookie prospect Oh "Pelican" Se-hyun and hitscan veteran Kai "Kai" Collins. In the first tournament cycle of the 2021 season, the May Melee tournament, Atlanta failed to advance to the regional knockouts after going 1–3 in the qualifiers. However, they found success in the June Joust, reaching the interregional tournament but ultimately losing in the lower bracket finals to the Shanghai Dragons. In the Summer Showdown, the Reign once again made it to the interregional tournament but were eliminated in the first round of the lower bracket by the Dallas Fuel. They also qualified for the Countdown Cup tournament but faced challenges with Pelican's health and were eventually eliminated by the Chengdu Hunters. Finishing the regular season with an 11– record, the Reign secured the fifth seed in the season playoffs. At the end of the regular season, Pelican received the Rookie of the Year award. In the playoffs, Atlanta fell to the Chengdu Hunters in the first round but made a run in the lower bracket, defeating the Washington Justice, Los Angeles Gladiators, San Francisco Shock, and Dallas Fuel. Their playoff journey led them to the Grand Finals against the Shanghai Dragons, where they were swept, resulting in a 0–4 loss.

In the offseason leading up to the 2022 season, the Atlanta Reign made significant changes to their roster. They decided to part ways with four players, including Pelican, who was transferred to the Houston Outlaws. They retained Gator, Hawk, and Kai, and also added rookies Lee "Venom" Dong-keun, Christian "Ojee" Han, and Benjamin "UltraViolet" David to the team. In addition, they signed damage veteran Charlie "nero" Zwarg. The Atlanta Reign's 2022 season saw the team rely on rookie talent to strengthen their roster, resulting in a relatively successful campaign. Notably, Overwatch Contenders standouts Ojee and UltraViolet provided the team with a stable and consistent backline throughout the year. Additionally, Venom and Speedily, who had showcased strong performances in the Path to Pro scene, made significant contributions in the frontline. A prominent figure in the Atlanta Reign's 2022 season was Nero, one of the Overwatch League's most veteran players. Nero's inclusion in the team's regular rotation was often dictated by the ever-changing meta of Overwatch 2. While tank player Gator didn't receive extensive playtime during the season, the Reign predominantly entrusted his counterpart, Hawk, with leadership responsibilities. The Reign made it to the 2022 playoffs, but they were sent home following two consecutive losses to the Florida Mayhem.

In the offseason preceding to the 2023 season, the Atlanta Reign underwent significant changes to their roster. The team announced in November 2022 that head coach Brad "Sephy" Rajani would be leaving his position and move into an analyst position. They decided to part ways with several players from the 2022 season, including Kai, Venom, Nero, Ojee, and Ultraviolet, and elected to retain Gator as their new head coach. With only Hawk and Vigilante remaining, the team made new signings to strengthen their lineup. The Reign signed experienced damage veterans Lee "Lip" Jae-won and Jeong "Stalk3r" Hak-yong to bolster their damage role. They also added rookie tank player Kim "D0NGHAK" Min-sung to the team. In the support role, Atlanta secured the services of Han "ChiYo" Hyeon-seok and Kwon "Fielder" Joon from the Dallas Fuel. On June 18, the Reign won the Midseason Madness tournament, after defeating the Houston Outlaws by a score of 4–1 in the finals. Despite earning first seed, the Reign were the first team to exit the 2023 playoffs, suffering a 2–3 reverse sweep by the Hangzhou Spark, as well as a 0–3 loss to the London Spitfire.

On November 10, 2023, the Reign announced that the team would be disbanded.

== Team identity ==
On October 23, 2018, Atlanta Esports Ventures announced that the team Atlanta-based team would be called the Atlanta Reign. "We are excited to finally unveil the Atlanta Reign," said President and chief executive officer of Atlanta Esports Ventures Paul Hamilton, "We said from the beginning that we are building to compete. We chose a name that reflects that intention. We want to engage directly with Atlanta's passionate esports community and the city as a whole."

The logo depicts a red phoenix inside a crest, with the rising phoenix representing Atlanta's city seal and new beginnings, as well as the team's name, representing "work ethic, reinvention, and excellence," especially that of the city of Atlanta. The official colors of the team are red, light gray, and charcoal gray.

== Personnel ==
=== Head coaches ===
Handle	Name	Seasons	Record	Notes	Ref.
Sephy	Brad Rajani	2019–2022	50–39 (.562)		
Gator	Blake Scott	2023	14–2 (.875)		

== Awards and records ==
=== Seasons overview ===
Season	P	W	L	W%	Finish	Playoffs
2019	28	16	12	.571	2nd, Atlantic	Lost in Lower Round 2, 0–4 (Spark)
2020	21	10	11	.476	5th, North America	Lost in NA Lower Round 2, 0–3 (Mayhem)
2021	16	11	5	.688	3rd, West	Lost in Grand Finals, 0–4 (Dragons)
2022	24	13	11	.542	5th, West	Lost in Lower Round 1, 1–3 (Mayhem)
2023	16	14	2	.875	1st, West	Lost in Lower Round 1, 0–3 (Spitfire)

=== Individual accomplishments ===
Rookie of the Year

- Pelican (Oh Se-hyun) – 2021

All-Star Game selections

- Dogman (Dusttin Bowerman) – 2019, 2020

== Academy team ==
In November 2018, the Atlanta Reign announced that unsponsored Overwatch Contenders team Last Night's Leftovers would be competing as Atlanta's academy team. The team rebranded to ATL Academy and began play as an affiliate team in the North America region of Contenders in Season 3 of 2018. The team consistently performed well, reaching the regional finals in both Season 3 of 2018 and Season 1 of 2019, although they couldn't secure victory in those matches. The team also qualified for the Atlantic Showdown, where they finished fourth in the tournament.

In Season 2 of 2019, ATL Academy achieved a perfect 7–0 win-loss record and a flawless 28–0 map record in the regular season, earning them the top seed in the regional playoffs. ATL Academy went on to sweep through the playoffs, dropping only one map, and emerged as the champions by defeating Gladiators Legion in the finals, securing their first Contenders regional title. Their victory in Season 2 qualified them as the top seed in The Gauntlet, an interregional Contenders tournament. ATL Academy reached the grand finals after a strong performance in the lower bracket. However, they fell short against Element Mystic, finishing as the runners-up in the tournament.

In March 2020, ATL Academy announced their withdrawal from Overwatch Contenders and went on an indefinite hiatus.
