= 2023 Overwatch League season =

- League: Overwatch League
- Sport: Overwatch 2
- Duration: April 27 – October 1, 2023
- Teams: 19
- TV partner: YouTube

Regular season
- Top seed: Atlanta Reign
- Season MVP: Ham "Someone" Jeong-wan

Midseason Madness
- Champions: Atlanta Reign
- Runners-up: Houston Outlaws

Grand Finals
- Venue: Mattamy Athletic Centre; Toronto, Canada
- Champions: Florida Mayhem
- Runners-up: Houston Outlaws
- Finals MVP: Choi "Mer1t" Tae-min

Overwatch League seasons
- ← 2022

The 2023 Overwatch League season was the sixth season of the Overwatch League (OWL), a professional esports league for the video game Overwatch 2. The teams were split between two regions: the East and the West. The season commenced with a preseason pro-am tournament held in the West Region, where Overwatch Contenders teams competed against Overwatch League teams. In the East Region, Overwatch Contenders teams joined the regular season alongside the established Overwatch League teams. The regular season was divided into two stages: Spring and Summer. The Spring stage, which began on April 27, concluded with the Midseason Madness, an interregional midseason tournament hosted in Seoul, South Korea. The Summer stage concluded with play-ins, season playoffs, and the Grand Finals. The playoffs were scheduled to take place at the Mattamy Athletic Centre in Toronto, Canada.

Several teams changed branding and regions for the 2023 season. The Paris Eternal relocated to Las Vegas and rebranded as the Vegas Eternal, becoming the league's first team to switch cities. The Philadelphia Fusion shifted its base to Seoul and rebranded as the Seoul Infernal. The Los Angeles Valiant returned to the West Region after competing in China, while the Dallas Fuel moved from the West to the East Region. Furthermore, the Chengdu Hunters disbanded.

Overwatch League teams initiated a collective bargaining process, seeking financial assistance to address operating costs and viewership challenges. The teams enlisted the representation of British law firm Sheridans to negotiate with Activision Blizzard. This collective bargaining process led to the agreement between OverActive Media, the owner of the Toronto Defiant, and the Overwatch League. As part of the deal, Toronto Defiant signed a sponsorship agreement with the league, and the Overwatch League agreed to waive the outstanding franchise fees owed by all of the teams.

== League format and changes ==
=== Format ===
In contrast to the previous seasons, which were usually split into four stages, the 2023 season was divided into two stages: Spring and Summer. The Spring stage culminated in the Midseason Madness, an interregional midseason tournament. The Summer stage was followed by the play-ins, season playoffs, and Grand Finals. In each stage, the Eastern region was divided into three sections: opens, qualifiers, and knockouts. Overwatch Contenders teams competed in the Opens, Overwatch League teams competed in the qualifiers, and both competed in the knockouts. In the Western region, no Contenders teams competed, and each stage started with qualifiers, with only the Spring stage having knockouts. In the Spring Stage, the top teams from the knockouts advanced to the Midseason Madness.

=== Rosters construction ===
Prior to the start of the season, all teams were required to have a minimum of six players and a maximum of 12 players signed to season-long contracts. Teams could sign players for a minimum of one season and could add an option to extend that contract for an additional year if they chose to do so. Teams were also allowed to sign players to short-term 30-day contracts, which could only be used on a given player once per season, and two-way contracts. The league reduced the minimum age required to compete from 18 to 17. Additionally, the minimum salary was increased to US$54,249. The free agency window was initially planned to open on November 19, 2022. However, after the announcement that Blizzard's licensing agreement with NetEase in China would expire on January 23, 2023, the league delayed the beginning of free agency to December 2, 2022. A day before the new start of free agency, the league once again moved back its starting date to December 23.

=== Teams and regions ===
Several teams relocated for the 2023 season. The Paris Eternal relocated to Las Vegas and rebranded to the Vegas Eternal. With their relocation, they became the first OWL team to relocate to a different city. The relocation also left the London Spitfire as the only European representative in the league. The Philadelphia Fusion also relocated to Seoul and rebranded to the Seoul Infernal, marking the first time that an OWL team has made a full rebrand. Since the 2020 season, the Fusion had been running their operations in South Korea; with the rebrand, the Infernal made Seoul their permanent base of operation. The Los Angeles Valiant, who had been competing out of China in the East Region for the past several seasons, returned to the West Region. The 2022 season champions Dallas Fuel also moved from the West region to the East.

Due to Blizzard's licensing agreement with NetEase in China ending, which resulted in the four Chinese OWL teams not being legally allowed to play Overwatch 2 in their country, the East Region expanded to allow Contenders teams to compete in the OWL. A total of 12 teams from several Contenders regions played in Spring Stage Opens, and the top teams from the Opens played in the OWL Spring Stage. Moreover, the league announced on April 18, 2023, that the Chengdu Hunters would not play in the Spring Stage qualifiers, as the Hunters were "[contemplating] the future direction of their team."

== Preseason pro-am ==
The official start to the season was preceded with a pro-am tournament in the West Region that began on March 23, 2023, in which Overwatch Contenders (OWC) teams played against OWL teams. A total of 20 teams — seven OWC teams and the 13 OWL Western Region teams — were split equally into four groups. The top eight teams from the group stage advanced to a single-elimination tournament, and the winner of the tournament will won $100,000.

=== Group stage ===
Group A

| Pos | Team | W | L | Qualification |
|---|---|---|---|---|
| 1 | Florida Mayhem | 4 | 0 | Advance to bracket |
| 2 | San Francisco Shock | 2 | 2 | Advance to bracket |
| 3 | Vancouver Titans | 2 | 2 | |
| 4 | Timeless (Note: Overwatch Contenders team) | 1 | 3 | |
| 5 | Trick Room | 1 | 3 | |

Source: Overwatch League

Group B

| Pos | Team | W | L | Qualification |
|---|---|---|---|---|
| 1 | Atlanta Reign | 4 | 0 | Advance to bracket |
| 2 | London Spitfire | 3 | 1 | Advance to bracket |
| 3 | Saints | 2 | 2 | |
| 4 | Los Angeles Valiant | 1 | 3 | |
| 5 | Vegas Eternal | 0 | 4 | |

Source: Overwatch League

Group C

| Pos | Team | W | L | Qualification |
|---|---|---|---|---|
| 1 | Boston Uprising | 4 | 0 | Advance to bracket |
| 2 | Los Angeles Gladiators | 3 | 1 | Advance to bracket |
| 3 | Washington Justice | 2 | 2 | |
| 4 | Wisp | 1 | 3 | |
| 5 | Team Peps | 0 | 4 | |

Source: Overwatch League

Group D

| Pos | Team | W | L | Qualification |
|---|---|---|---|---|
| 1 | Houston Outlaws | 4 | 0 | Advance to bracket |
| 2 | Toronto Defiant | 3 | 1 | Advance to bracket |
| 3 | Twisted Minds | 2 | 2 | |
| 4 | New York Excelsior | 1 | 3 | |
| 5 | Redbird Esports | 0 | 4 | |

Source: Overwatch League

=== Bracket ===
Quarterfinals
April 8
Florida Mayhem | 3
London Spitfire | 0
April 8
Boston Uprising | 2
Toronto Defiant | 3
April 8
Houston Outlaws | 3
San Francisco Shock | 2
April 8
Atlanta Reign | 2
Los Angeles Gladiators | 3

Semifinals
April 9
Florida Mayhem | 3
Toronto Defiant | 0
April 9
Houston Outlaws | 2
Los Angeles Gladiators | 3

Final
April 9
Florida Mayhem | 4
Los Angeles Gladiators | 2

Source: Overwatch League

== Overall standings ==
The overall standings determined which teams advance to the postseason. Qualification for the postseason is different for the East and West regions.

=== East region ===
Qualification for the postseason was determined by average placements in the Spring and Summer knockouts. The top two teams from the East advanced directly to the playoffs, and any OWL teams that were not already in the top two advanced to the play-ins.

| Pos | Team | SPR | SUM | AVG | PCT | MW | ML | MT | MD | Qualification |
|---|---|---|---|---|---|---|---|---|---|---|
| 1 | Hangzhou Spark | 1 | 1 | 1 | 1.000 | 20 | 4 | 0 | +16 | Advance to season playoffs |
| 2 | Seoul Infernal | 1 | 3 | 2 | 0.667 | 16 | 10 | 0 | +6 | Advance to season playoffs |
| 3 | Dallas Fuel | 2 | 2 | 2 | 0.500 | 14 | 17 | 0 | −3 | Advance to regional play-ins |
| 4 | O2 Blast | 3 | 2 | 2.5 | 0.667 | 22 | 13 | 0 | +9 | |
| 5 | Seoul Dynasty | 5 | 1 | 3 | 0.625 | 17 | 15 | 1 | +2 | Advance to regional play-ins |
| 6 | Dreamers | 2 | 4 | 3 | 0.555 | 17 | 18 | 1 | −1 | |
| 7 | Poker Face | 4 | 3 | 3.5 | 0.555 | 19 | 16 | 0 | +3 | |
| 8 | Guangzhou Charge | 3 | 5 | 4 | 0.200 | 8 | 13 | 0 | −5 | Advance to regional play-ins |
| 9 | Sin Prisa Gaming | 5 | 4 | 4.5 | 0.429 | 13 | 17 | 0 | −4 | |
| 10 | Panthera | 4 | 5 | 4.5 | 0.200 | 6 | 12 | 0 | −6 | |
| 11 | Shanghai Dragons | 5 | 5 | 5 | 0.000 | 5 | 12 | 0 | −7 | Advance to regional play-ins |
| 12 | Rhodes | 5 | 5 | 5 | 0.000 | 2 | 12 | 0 | −10 | |

Source: The Overwatch League
Rules for classification: 1) Average placement in regional knockouts; 2) winning percentage

=== West region ===
Qualification for the postseason was determined by winning percentage in the Spring and Summer qualifiers. The top three teams advanced directly to the season playoffs, while the following seven teams advanced to the play-ins. The remaining two teams that emerged from the play-ins also advanced to the season playoffs, finalizing the 5 teams advancing to the season playoffs.

| Pos | Team | Pld | W | L | PCT | MW | ML | MT | MD | Qualification |
|---|---|---|---|---|---|---|---|---|---|---|
| 1 | Atlanta Reign | 16 | 14 | 2 | 0.875 | 45 | 12 | 0 | +33 | Advance to season playoffs |
| 2 | Florida Mayhem | 16 | 14 | 2 | 0.875 | 46 | 17 | 0 | +29 | Advance to season playoffs |
| 3 | Houston Outlaws | 16 | 13 | 3 | 0.813 | 41 | 20 | 0 | +21 | Advance to season playoffs |
| 4 | Boston Uprising | 16 | 11 | 5 | 0.688 | 39 | 21 | 0 | +18 | Advance to regional play-ins |
| 5 | Vancouver Titans | 16 | 8 | 8 | 0.500 | 33 | 26 | 0 | +7 | Advance to regional play-ins |
| 6 | Toronto Defiant | 16 | 8 | 8 | 0.500 | 32 | 32 | 0 | 0 | Advance to regional play-ins |
| 7 | San Francisco Shock | 16 | 8 | 8 | 0.500 | 30 | 33 | 1 | −3 | Advance to regional play-ins |
| 8 | London Spitfire | 16 | 7 | 9 | 0.438 | 28 | 32 | 0 | −4 | Advance to regional play-ins |
| 9 | New York Excelsior | 16 | 7 | 9 | 0.438 | 28 | 33 | 0 | −5 | Advance to regional play-ins |
| 10 | Washington Justice | 16 | 6 | 10 | 0.375 | 23 | 32 | 0 | −9 | Advance to regional play-ins |
| 11 | Los Angeles Gladiators | 16 | 6 | 10 | 0.375 | 23 | 35 | 1 | −12 | |
| 12 | Los Angeles Valiant | 16 | 2 | 14 | 0.125 | 14 | 46 | 0 | −32 | |
| 13 | Vegas Eternal | 16 | 0 | 16 | 0.000 | 5 | 48 | 0 | −43 | |

Source: The Overwatch League
Rules for classification: 1) winning percentage; 2) map differential; 3) head-to-head record; 4) head-to-head map differential

== Regular season ==
=== Spring stage ===
The Spring Split began on April 27, 2023.

==== East region ====
The Eastern region Spring stage was divided into three sections: opens, qualifiers, and knockouts. The Spring stage began with opens, where Overwatch Contenders teams competed to play in the OWL. The top four teams that make it past the opens joined Overwatch League teams in the Spring Eastern regional knockouts. Then, the Eastern Overwatch League teams competed in the qualifiers; every team advanced past the qualifiers, as they only acted as seeding for the knockouts. All Eastern OWL teams and qualified Contenders teams then competed in the Eastern knockouts. The top two teams from the knockouts advanced to the Midseason Madness.

===== Qualifiers =====
| Pos | Team | Pld | W | L | PCT | MW | ML | MT | MD | Qualification |
|---|---|---|---|---|---|---|---|---|---|---|
| 1 | Guangzhou Charge | 5 | 4 | 1 | 0.800 | 14 | 4 | 0 | +10 | Advance to regional knockouts upper round 2 |
| 2 | Seoul Infernal | 5 | 4 | 1 | 0.800 | 14 | 5 | 0 | +9 | Advance to regional knockouts upper round 2 |
| 3 | Hangzhou Spark | 5 | 3 | 2 | 0.600 | 9 | 8 | 0 | +1 | Advance to regional knockouts upper round 2 |
| 4 | Dallas Fuel | 5 | 2 | 3 | 0.400 | 7 | 10 | 0 | −3 | Advance to regional knockouts upper round 2 |
| 5 | Seoul Dynasty | 5 | 1 | 4 | 0.200 | 6 | 14 | 0 | −8 | Advance to regional knockouts upper round 1 |
| 6 | Shanghai Dragons | 5 | 1 | 4 | 0.200 | 4 | 13 | 0 | −9 | Advance to regional knockouts upper round 1 |

Source: The Overwatch League
Rules for classification: 1) winning percentage; 2) map differential; 3) head-to-head record; 4) head-to-head map differential

===== Knockouts =====
Bracket A

Upper round 1
May 20
Dreamers | 0
Poker Face | 3
May 20
Rhodes | 0
Seoul Dynasty | 3
Lower round 1
May 27
Seoul Dynasty | 0
Dreamers | 3
May 27
Poker Face | 3
Rhodes | 1

Upper round 2
May 21
Guangzhou Charge | 3
Poker Face | 1
May 21
Hangzhou Spark | 3
Seoul Dynasty | 1
Lower round 2
May 28
Dreamers | 3
Poker Face | 2

Upper final
May 28
Guangzhou Charge | 2
Hangzhou Spark | 3
Lower final
June 3
Guangzhou Charge | 1
Dreamers | 3

Final
June 4
Hangzhou Spark | 4
Dreamers | 0

Source: Overwatch League

Bracket B

Upper round 1
May 20
Panthera | 0
O2 Blast | 3
May 20
SPG | 3
Shanghai Dragons | 2
Lower round 1
May 27
SPG | 0
Panthera | 3
May 27
O2 Blast | 3
Shanghai Dragons | 0

Upper round 2
May 21
Seoul Infernal | 3
O2 Blast | 2
May 21
Dallas Fuel | 3
SPG | 1
Lower round 2
May 28
Panthera | 1
O2 Blast | 3

Upper final
May 28
Seoul Infernal | 3
Dallas Fuel | 1
Lower final
June 3
Dallas Fuel | 3
O2 Blast | 1

Final
June 4
Seoul Infernal | 4
Dallas Fuel | 0

Source: Overwatch League

==== West region ====
The West region Spring stage was divided into two sections: qualifiers and knockouts. The top two teams from the qualifiers advanced directly to the Midseason Madness, while the following eight advanced to the knockouts. The top two teams from the knockouts also advanced to the Midseason Madness.

===== Qualifiers =====
| Pos | Team | Pld | W | L | PCT | MW | ML | MT | MD | Qualification |
|---|---|---|---|---|---|---|---|---|---|---|
| 1 | Atlanta Reign | 8 | 8 | 0 | 1.000 | 24 | 2 | 0 | +22 | Advance to Midseason Madness |
| 2 | Houston Outlaws | 8 | 7 | 1 | 0.875 | 22 | 8 | 0 | +14 | Advance to Midseason Madness |
| 3 | Florida Mayhem | 8 | 6 | 2 | 0.750 | 22 | 10 | 0 | +12 | Advance to regional knockouts upper bracket |
| 4 | Boston Uprising | 8 | 6 | 2 | 0.750 | 19 | 9 | 0 | +10 | Advance to regional knockouts upper bracket |
| 5 | Washington Justice | 8 | 5 | 3 | 0.625 | 15 | 10 | 0 | +5 | Advance to regional knockouts upper bracket |
| 6 | Los Angeles Gladiators | 8 | 5 | 3 | 0.625 | 15 | 14 | 0 | +1 | Advance to regional knockouts upper bracket |
| 7 | Vancouver Titans | 8 | 4 | 4 | 0.500 | 15 | 13 | 0 | +2 | Advance to regional knockouts lower bracket |
| 8 | Toronto Defiant | 8 | 3 | 5 | 0.375 | 14 | 17 | 0 | −3 | Advance to regional knockouts lower bracket |
| 9 | New York Excelsior | 8 | 3 | 5 | 0.375 | 14 | 17 | 0 | −3 | Advance to regional knockouts lower bracket |
| 10 | San Francisco Shock | 8 | 3 | 5 | 0.375 | 11 | 20 | 0 | −9 | Advance to regional knockouts lower bracket |
| 11 | London Spitfire | 8 | 2 | 6 | 0.250 | 11 | 19 | 0 | −8 | |
| 12 | Los Angeles Valiant | 8 | 0 | 8 | 0.000 | 4 | 24 | 0 | −20 | |
| 13 | Vegas Eternal | 8 | 0 | 8 | 0.000 | 1 | 24 | 0 | −23 | |

Source: Overwatch League
Rules for classification: 1) winning percentage; 2) map differential; 3) head-to-head record; 4) head-to-head map differential

===== Knockouts =====
Upper round 1 | Upper final
June 2
Los Angeles Gladiators | 3
Florida Mayhem | 0 | June 3
Los Angeles Gladiators | 0
June 2 | Boston Uprising | 3
Washington Justice | 2
Boston Uprising | 3
Lower round 1 | Lower round 2 | Lower round 3 | Lower final
June 3
June 2 | Florida Mayhem | 3 | June 4
San Francisco Shock | 3 | San Francisco Shock | 1 | June 4 | Los Angeles Gladiators | 2
Vancouver Titans | 2 | Florida Mayhem | 3 | Florida Mayhem | 3
June 3 | Washington Justice | 1
June 2 | Washington Justice | 3
New York Excelsior | 3 | New York Excelsior | 0
Toronto Defiant | 1

Source: Overwatch League

=== Midseason Madness ===
The Midseason Madness was a double elimination tournament that was the culmination of the Spring Stage and featured six teams — four from the West and two from the East. The event took place from June 15 to 17 in Seoul, South Korea, at the Korea International Exhibition Center. It marked the first time that the OWL has held a live event in the APAC region.

==== Bracket ====
Upper round 1
June 15
Florida Mayhem | 2
Hangzhou Spark | 3
June 15
Boston Uprising | 0
Houston Outlaws | 3
Lower round 1
June 16
Seoul Infernal | 2
Florida Mayhem | 3
June 16
Hangzhou Spark | 1
Boston Uprising | 3

Upper round 2
June 15
Atlanta Reign | 3
Hangzhou Spark | 0
June 15
Seoul Infernal | 0
Houston Outlaws | 3
Lower round 2
June 17
Florida Mayhem | 3
Boston Uprising | 0

Upper final
June 17
Atlanta Reign | 3
Houston Outlaws | 2
Lower final
June 17
Houston Outlaws | 3
Florida Mayhem | 1

Final
June 17
Atlanta Reign | 4
Houston Outlaws | 1

Source: Overwatch League

=== Summer stage ===
The Summer stage began on July 12, 2023.

==== East region ====
Similar to the Spring stage, the Eastern region Summer stage was divided into three sections: opens, qualifiers, and knockouts. The Summer stage began with opens, where Overwatch Contenders teams competed, and the top teams there advanced to the Summer Eastern regional knockouts. Unlike the Spring stage, both the Eastern Overwatch League teams and Overwatch Contenders teams that competed in the Spring stage knockout also competed in the qualifiers. Every team advanced past the qualifiers, as they only acted as seeding for the knockouts.

===== Qualifiers =====
| Pos | Team | Pld | W | L | PCT | MW | ML | MT | MD | Qualification |
|---|---|---|---|---|---|---|---|---|---|---|
| 1 | Dallas Fuel | 8 | 7 | 1 | 0.875 | 23 | 7 | 0 | +16 | Advance to regional knockouts upper round 2 |
| 2 | Seoul Infernal | 8 | 7 | 1 | 0.875 | 21 | 6 | 0 | +15 | Advance to regional knockouts upper round 2 |
| 3 | Hangzhou Spark | 8 | 6 | 2 | 0.750 | 20 | 11 | 0 | +9 | Advance to regional knockouts upper round 2 |
| 4 | Seoul Dynasty | 8 | 5 | 3 | 0.625 | 18 | 14 | 0 | +4 | Advance to regional knockouts upper round 2 |
| 5 | Dreamers | 8 | 4 | 4 | 0.500 | 16 | 14 | 0 | +2 | Advance to regional knockouts upper round 1 |
| 6 | Shanghai Dragons | 8 | 4 | 4 | 0.500 | 16 | 16 | 0 | 0 | Advance to regional knockouts upper round 1 |
| 7 | Panthera | 8 | 3 | 5 | 0.375 | 14 | 20 | 0 | −6 | Advance to regional knockouts upper round 1 |
| 8 | O2 Blast | 8 | 2 | 6 | 0.250 | 9 | 21 | 0 | −12 | Advance to regional knockouts upper round 1 |
| 9 | Poker Face | 8 | 1 | 7 | 0.125 | 8 | 22 | 0 | −14 | Advance to regional knockouts upper round 1 |
| 10 | Guangzhou Charge | 8 | 1 | 7 | 0.125 | 8 | 22 | 0 | −14 | Advance to regional knockouts upper round 1 |

Source: The Overwatch League
Rules for classification: 1) winning percentage; 2) map differential; 3) head-to-head record; 4) head-to-head map differential

===== Knockouts =====
Bracket A

Upper round 1
August 26
Poker Face | 3
Panthera | 1
August 26
Rhodes | 1
Dreamers | 3
Lower round 1
September 2
Dreamers | 3
Panthera | 1
September 2
Poker Face | 3
Rhodes | 0

Upper round 2
August 27
Dallas Fuel | 3
Poker Face | 0
August 27
Hangzhou Spark | 3
Dreamers | 0
Lower round 2
September 3
Dreamers | 2
Poker Face | 3

Upper final
September 3
Dallas Fuel | 0
Hangzhou Spark | 3
Lower final
September 9
Dallas Fuel | 3
Poker Face | 1

Final
September 10
Hangzhou Spark | 4
Dallas Fuel | 1

Source: Overwatch League

Bracket B

Upper round 1
August 26
Guangzhou Charge | 1
O2 Blast | 3
August 26
Sin Prisa Gaming | 3
Shanghai Dragons | 1
Lower round 1
September 2
Seoul Dynasty | 3
Guangzhou Charge | 1
September 2
Sin Prisa Gaming | 3
Shanghai Dragons | 2

Upper round 2
August 27
Seoul Dynasty | 0
O2 Blast | 3
August 27
Seoul Infernal | 3
Sin Prisa Gaming | 1
Lower round 2
September 3
Seoul Dynasty | 3
Sin Prisa Gaming | 2

Upper final
September 3
O2 Blast | 3
Seoul Infernal | 1
Lower final
September 9
Seoul Infernal | 2
Seoul Dynasty | 3

Final
September 10
O2 Blast | 1
Seoul Dynasty | 4

Source: Overwatch League

==== West region ====
For the Summer stage, the West region only had qualifiers.

===== Qualifiers =====
| Pos | Team | Pld | W | L | PCT | MW | ML | MT | MD |
|---|---|---|---|---|---|---|---|---|---|
| 1 | Florida Mayhem | 8 | 8 | 0 | 1.000 | 24 | 7 | 0 | +17 |
| 2 | Atlanta Reign | 8 | 6 | 2 | 0.750 | 21 | 10 | 0 | +11 |
| 3 | Houston Outlaws | 8 | 6 | 2 | 0.750 | 19 | 12 | 0 | +7 |
| 4 | Boston Uprising | 8 | 5 | 3 | 0.625 | 20 | 12 | 0 | +8 |
| 5 | San Francisco Shock | 8 | 5 | 3 | 0.625 | 19 | 13 | 1 | +6 |
| 6 | London Spitfire | 8 | 5 | 3 | 0.625 | 17 | 13 | 0 | +4 |
| 7 | Toronto Defiant | 8 | 5 | 3 | 0.625 | 18 | 15 | 0 | +3 |
| 8 | Vancouver Titans | 8 | 4 | 4 | 0.500 | 18 | 13 | 0 | +5 |
| 9 | New York Excelsior | 8 | 4 | 4 | 0.500 | 14 | 16 | 0 | −2 |
| 10 | Los Angeles Valiant | 8 | 2 | 6 | 0.250 | 10 | 22 | 0 | −12 |
| 11 | Los Angeles Gladiators | 8 | 1 | 7 | 0.125 | 8 | 21 | 1 | −13 |
| 12 | Washington Justice | 8 | 1 | 7 | 0.125 | 8 | 22 | 0 | −14 |
| 13 | Vegas Eternal | 8 | 0 | 8 | 0.000 | 4 | 24 | 0 | −20 |

Source: The Overwatch League
Rules for classification: 1) winning percentage; 2) map differential; 3) head-to-head record; 4) head-to-head map differential

== Postseason ==
=== Play-in tournaments ===
East

Upper round 1
September 15
3 | Dallas Fuel | 3
6 | Shanghai Dragons | 0
September 15
4 | Seoul Dynasty | 3
5 | Guangzhou Charge | 0
Lower round 1
September 16
6 | Shanghai Dragons | 2
5 | Guangzhou Charge | 3

Upper final
September 16
3 | Dallas Fuel | 3
4 | Seoul Dynasty | 0
Lower final
September 17
4 | Seoul Dynasty | 3
5 | Guangzhou Charge | 0

Final
September 17
3 | Dallas Fuel | 3
4 | Seoul Dynasty | 1

Source: Overwatch League

West

Elimination round
September 9
9 | New York Excelsior | 1
10 | Washington Justice | 3

Upper round 1
September 9
7 | San Francisco Shock | 1
8 | London Spitfire | 3
September 9
6 | Toronto Defiant | 3
10 | Washington Justice | 0
Lower round 1
September 16
5 | Vancouver Titans | 3
7 | San Francisco Shock | 0
September 16
8 | London Spitfire | 3
10 | Washington Justice | 2

Upper round 2
September 10
4 | Boston Uprising | 3
8 | London Spitfire | 1
September 10
5 | Vancouver Titans | 2
6 | Toronto Defiant | 3
Lower round 2
September 17
5 | Vancouver Titans | 2
8 | London Spitfire | 3

Upper final
September 16
4 | Boston Uprising | 3
6 | Toronto Defiant | 2
Lower final
September 17
6 | Toronto Defiant | 1
8 | London Spitfire | 3

Source: Overwatch League

=== Playoffs ===
Five teams from the West Region and three teams from the East Region advanced to the season playoffs, which took place at the Mattamy Athletic Centre in Toronto, Canada. These teams were divided into groups of four and competed in separate double-elimination brackets over three days. The top two teams from each bracket then entered a four-team, single-elimination Grand Finals bracket. All matches in the Grand Finals bracket were held on October 1, and the winner was crowned the 2023 Overwatch League champion, receiving a trophy and a prize of US$1 million. Second and third places also earned substantial rewards, with $400,000 and $225,000, respectively. Monetary rewards extended to the sixth-place team.

==== Bracket ====
Bracket A

Upper round 1
September 28
1 | Atlanta Reign | 2
4 | Hangzhou Spark | 3
September 28
2 | London Spitfire | 1
3 | Boston Uprising | 3
Lower round 1
September 29
1 | Atlanta Reign | 0
2 | London Spitfire | 3

Upper final
September 29
4 | Hangzhou Spark | 3
3 | Boston Uprising | 2
Lower final
September 30
3 | Boston Uprising | 3
2 | London Spitfire | 1

Advance to Grand Finals Bracket
A1 | Hangzhou Spark
A2 | Boston Uprising

Bracket B

Upper round 1
September 28
1 | Seoul Infernal | 0
4 | Dallas Fuel | 3
September 28
2 | Florida Mayhem | 3
3 | Houston Outlaws | 1
Lower round 1
September 29
1 | Seoul Infernal | 0
3 | Houston Outlaws | 3

Upper final
September 29
4 | Dallas Fuel | 0
2 | Florida Mayhem | 3
Lower final
September 30
4 | Dallas Fuel | 0
3 | Houston Outlaws | 3

Advance to Grand Finals Bracket
B1 | Florida Mayhem
B2 | Houston Outlaws

Grand Finals bracket

Semifinals
October 1
A1 | Hangzhou Spark | 0
B2 | Houston Outlaws | 3
October 1
B1 | Florida Mayhem | 3
A2 | Boston Uprising | 1

Grand Final
October 1
B2 | Houston Outlaws | 0
B1 | Florida Mayhem | 4
Third place
October 1
A1 | Hangzhou Spark | 3
A2 | Boston Uprising | 0

== Awards ==
=== Individual awards ===
| Award | Recipient |
|---|---|
| Most Valuable Player | Ham "Someone" Jeong-wan (Florida Mayhem) |
| Dennis Hawelka Award | Ham "Someone" Jeong-wan (Florida Mayhem) |
| Alarm Rookie of the Year | Kim "Donghak" Min-sung (Atlanta Reign) |
| Coach of the Year | Jordan "Gunba" Graham (Florida Mayhem) |
| Grand Finals MVP | Choi "Mer1t" Tae-min (Florida Mayhem) |

=== Role Stars ===
| Damage | Tank | Support |
|---|---|---|
| Kim "Zest" Hyun-woo (Seoul Infernal) | Choi "Hanbin" Han-been (Dallas Fuel) | Han "Chiyo" Hyeon-seok (Atlanta Reign) |
| Jeong "Stalk3r" Hak-yong (Atlanta Reign) | Lee "Fearless" Eui-seok (Houston Outlaws) | Kim "Skewed" Min-seok (Seoul Infernal) |
| Huang "Leave" Xin (Hangzhou Spark) | Kim "Mag" Tae-sung (Seoul Infernal) | Kwon "Fielder" Joon (Atlanta Reign) |
| Lee "Lip" Jae-won (Atlanta Reign) | Ham "Someone" Jeong-wan (Florida Mayhem) | Kwon "Fixa" Yeong-hun (Seoul Infernal) |

== Notable events ==
=== Collective bargaining and Defiant deal ===
According to esports journalist Jacob Wolf, Overwatch League teams retained British law firm Sheridans to start a collective bargaining process against the league, in an attempt to receive financial assistance after several years of high operating costs and low viewership. OverActive Media, the owners of the Toronto Defiant, was leading this collective bargaining effort, as reported by Wolf.

On June 5, 2023, OverActive Media announced that Toronto Defiant had signed a sponsorship deal with the league, and the Overwatch League agreed to waive the outstanding franchise fees that OverActive Media had paid to enter the league. The agreement between OverActive Media and the Overwatch League consisted of three distinct components. Firstly, OverActive Media received an early payment of the league revenue share. Secondly, they secured a sponsorship agreement with the Toronto Ultra, their Call of Duty League franchise. Lastly, the Overwatch League eliminated the entry fees, which amounted to US$8.04 million. Prior to the deal, it had been reported that the Overwatch League teams collectively owed Activision Blizzard a considerable sum, with each team owing approximately $6 to $7.5 million, totaling $120 to $150 million. Although OverActive Media's CEO and co-founder, Adam Adamou, stated that it is "fair to assume that an agreement like this covers all of the teams," he did not explicitly confirm whether other teams received the same deal. However, Adamou did acknowledge that the agreement was part of the collective bargaining process. It was later confirmed by Sports Business Journal that this waiver of outstanding entry fees applied to the entire Overwatch League, not just the Toronto Defiant.

=== Blizzard's contract with NetEase expires ===
On January 24, 2023, Activision Blizzard and NetEase ended their 14-year licensing agreement. With the termination of the agreement, all Activision Blizzard titles that were operated by NetEase, which includes Overwatch 2, went offline in China. This resulted in the four Chinese Overwatch League teams — Chengdu Hunters, Guangzhou Charge, Shanghai Dragons (owned by NetEase), and Hangzhou Spark — no longer being able to play in their home country. Additionally, competitions related to unapproved games in China are not allowed to be broadcast on Chinese live-streaming platforms. While some unapproved games have been broadcast in China in the past, the Chinese government is expected to "strictly enforce" this policy as it pertains to Blizzard titles.

=== Chengdu Hunters disband ===
On April 18, 2023, the Overwatch League announced that the Chengdu Hunters would not be participating in the 2023 Spring Stage qualifiers, which were scheduled to begin on April 29 in the East Region. This marked the first time in the history of the Overwatch League that a team had effectively dropped out of competition, even temporarily. According to a statement from the Chengdu Hunters posted on social media, the team was contemplating the future direction of their team, leaving open the possibility of their participation in the Summer Stage but providing little concrete information to fans.

The situation surrounding the Chengdu Hunters became even more uncertain when on May 4, 2023, The Esports Advocate reported that the team had disbanded. The Chengdu Hunters were owned by Huya, Inc., a Chinese gaming livestreaming platform. Doubts about the franchise's future first arose in January when the team tweeted about the shutdown of Overwatch 2 in mainland China due to a breakdown in the longstanding relationship between Activision Blizzard and NetEase, the game's Chinese distribution partner. Financial instability may have played a role in the Chengdu Hunters' absence this season. Huya, Inc., facing fluctuating stock prices and reported losses, replaced its board director, potentially leading the organization to reduce esports spending.

On June 20, 2023, it was confirmed that the Chengdu Hunters franchise would be officially leaving the Overwatch League. This decision made them the first team to fully exit the league.

== Media ==
In early 2020, Activision Blizzard signed a three-year broadcasting rights deal with YouTube, making the streaming platform the exclusive broadcasting partner for the OWL. On April 21, 2023, it was confirmed that the Overwatch League season would continue to be exclusively broadcast on YouTube, despite the expiration of the previous exclusive broadcast rights deal between Blizzard and YouTube. The choice of streaming platform for the 2023 season garnered mixed responses from fans, with some fans expressing disappointment over the exclusive availability on YouTube rather than Twitch.

== Prize pool ==
Teams in the 2023 season competed for a prize pool across the midseason tournament and playoffs, with the payout division detailed below. The Midseason Madness and season playoffs had a prize pool of over US$1 million.

| Team | Midseason Madness | Season playoffs | Total |
|---|---|---|---|
| Atlanta Reign | $500,000 | – | $500,000 |
| Boston Uprising | $100,000 | $130,000 | $230,000 |
| Dallas Fuel | – | $50,000 | $50,000 |
| Florida Mayhem | $120,000 | $1,000,000 | $1,120,000 |
| Guangzhou Charge | – | – | $0 |
| Hangzhou Spark | $80,000 | $225,000 | $305,000 |
| Houston Outlaws | $200,000 | $400,000 | $600,000 |
| London Spitfire | – | $50,000 | $50,000 |
| Los Angeles Gladiators | – | – | $0 |
| Los Angeles Valiant | – | – | $0 |
| New York Excelsior | – | – | $0 |
| Vegas Eternal | – | – | $0 |
| Philadelphia Fusion | – | – | $0 |
| San Francisco Shock | – | – | $0 |
| Seoul Dynasty | $80,000 | – | $80,000 |
| Shanghai Dragons | – | – | $0 |
| Toronto Defiant | – | – | $0 |
| Vancouver Titans | – | – | $0 |
| Washington Justice | – | – | $0 |
| Total | $1,080,000 | $1,855,000 | $2,935,000 |
