= Jake (gamer) =

American esports player (born 1996)

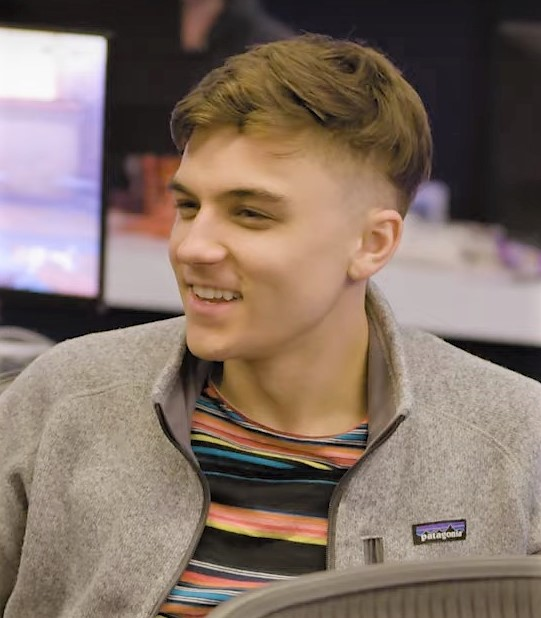

Personal information
- Name: Jacob Lyon
- Born: July 28, 1996 (age 30); San Diego, California
- Nationality: American

Career information
- Games: Team Fortress 2; Overwatch
- Playing career: 2016–2019, 2021
- Role: Damage, support
- Number: 76
- Coaching career: 2021–2022

Team history

As player:
- 2016–2017: -bird noises-
- 2017: Hammers Esports
- 2017: Luminosity Gaming Evil
- 2018–2019, 2021: Houston Outlaws

As coach:
- 2021–2022: Houston Outlaws

Career highlights and awards
- No. 76 retired by the Houston Outlaws

Jacob Lyon (born July 28, 1996), better known by his online alias Jake, is an American former professional Overwatch player and coach most known for his time with the Houston Outlaws of the Overwatch League. Prior to joining the Outlaws, he played for the teams -bird noises-, Hammers Esports, and Luminosity Gaming Evil and was the captain of Team USA at the 2017 Overwatch World Cup. After retiring as a player, Lyon joined the Overwatch League broadcast team as an analysis caster. In 2021, Lyon came out of retirement and signed with the Houston Outlaws as a player and coach before retiring again in 2022.

Lyon is one of the Overwatch League's best-known players and has served as an ambassador of esports. He was interviewed by The Today Show about the Overwatch League, and represented esports players at a summit with the International Olympic Committee.

== Playing career ==
=== Early career ===
Prior to the release of Overwatch, Lyon was a Team Fortress 2 (TF2) player under the alias "sneakypolarbear". He began playing at 11 and competing at age 14, first in the Highlander and later in the 6v6 competitive formats. Two years later he had become skilled enough to receive an ESEA League invitation. When he decided to compete in Overwatch, he changed his alias to "Jake" (sometimes stylized as "JAKE") to avoid being mistaken as the League of Legends player Sneaky.^{2:10, 4:10}^{1:30}

Lyon did not receive an invitation to participate in Overwatch's pre-release open beta, and began playing the game only upon its public release. At the time, Lyon was a college student and was studying abroad in the Netherlands. He was able to distinguish himself as one of the game's best players, achieving a top-500 rank in the game's competitive mode, despite playing on sub-optimal equipment.^{3:00} Lyon credits his time playing Team Fortress 2 for giving him a strong starting point for Overwatch, noting that as a TF2 Soldier player, he had experience with both hitscan and projectile weapons, and that the in-game communication style transferred over well, since both games were fast-paced and required a large amount of in-game communication.^{6:20, 7:50}

Jake and five other former Team Fortress 2 players found the team -bird noises-, reusing a team name that two of the other players had used in TF2. Although they all came from the same game, most had not played with each other before Overwatch. -bird noises- was eventually signed by Hammers Esports. In an interview, Jake described Hammers as the first organization to give them a reasonable offer, mentioning that they had received other offers before Hammers', but that they were not for living wages, and one even offered to pay them in mouse pads.^{4:30, 18:00} Hammers sold the roster to Luminosity Gaming a few months later, and since Luminosity already had an Overwatch roster, the former-Hammers roster competed under the name Luminosity Gaming Evil.^{4:25} During one online competition as part of LG Evil, Lyon attempted to play through a tornado warning, and at one point the match had to be delayed because he needed to evacuate to the basement of his college dorm until the warning passed.^{28:00}

=== Houston Outlaws ===
In the months between the World Cup qualifiers and the finals, Lyon was signed to the OpTic Gaming-owned Houston Outlaws, one of the teams in the newly formed Overwatch League. Three of Lyon's World Cup teammates would also go on to be part of the team; Matt "coolmatt69" Iorio had already been signed, and Shane "Rawkus" Flaherty and Russell "FCTFCTN" were signed after Lyon. Partway through the year, Kyle "KyKy" Souder, the 2017 World Cup team coach, also joined Outlaws as an assistant coach. In their inaugural season, the Outlaws would finish with a 22-18 match record, and end the season in 7th place, one spot short of making the end-of-year playoffs.

In Overwatch, Jake is projectile DPS specialist and in-game leader. Extremely proficient with the hero Junkrat, he became so closely associated with the character that fans began calling him "Jakerat".^{6:15} Lyon credits his success with the character on being willing to take aggressive, one-on-one engagements with opponents, and on having devised ways to maximize the hero's impact that other players had not yet discovered. In addition to Junkrat, Jake is known for his play on the heroes Soldier: 76 and Pharah, and for being an in-game shot caller (a player that communicates strategy to teammates during the game).^{7:30}^{2:00}

On December 7, 2019, Lyon announced that he was retiring from professional Overwatch competition, citing that he felt that he "forcibly stagnated [his] process of learning, growth, and exploration."

On January 21, 2021, Lyon came out of retirement and signed with the Houston Outlaws as a player and the director of player development. In the 2022 season, he stepped down as a player to assume a coaching position with the Outlaws.

=== National team career ===
Jake was selected as the captain of the 2017 United States Overwatch World Cup team. The team qualified for the tournament finals at BlizzCon 2017 through their participation in a qualification tournament in Santa Monica, California. This event was Lyon's first offline tournament in front of a live audience; his previous competitions were online-only.^{1:30} At the main event, the team lost in the quarterfinals in an unexpectedly close series to favorites and eventual tournament-winners South Korea.

== Commentating career ==
Lyon declined tryouts for the 2018 Overwatch World Cup, announcing on Twitter that he had "bigger plans this year". This fueled rumors that Jake would be retiring as a player, either to join a team's coaching staff or to become an in-game broadcaster or "caster". He would later be announced as a caster for the Incheon, South Korea stage of the World Cup qualifiers, paired with veteran caster Andrew "ZP" Rush. As a caster duo, Rush would handle play-by-play casting, and Lyon would handle analysis.

After retiring from competitive Overwatch in late 2019, Lyon joined the Overwatch League talent team as a commentator.

On April 19, 2023, Overwatch League announced that Lyon would be joining the Overwatch League desk for the 2023 season. He made his first appearance on day 1 of the Overwatch League 2023 Season Spring Stage Qualifiers on April 27. Lyon rejoined the desk during the Overwatch World Cup 2023 at Blizzcon in Anaheim, CA on November 3-4. From December 15 to 17, 2023, Lyon was a commentator and caster during the Overwatch 2 2023 EMEA and NA FlashOps Holiday Showdown.

== Esports ambassador ==
Charismatic and outspoken, Lyon has developed a reputation as a "leading personality amongst players",^{4:50} and is seen as an ambassador to Overwatch and to esports as a whole. Financial Review called him "the perfect poster-boy for the sport as it tries to dispel the prejudice that computer-gaming is a lonely pursuit of wastrels and slobs". In July 2018, Lyons was selected as one of two Overwatch League players to attend a summit between the International Olympic Committee and the esports community. The Times-Standard praised the selection, saying that Lyon was "likely one of the best players that could have been selected to publicly represent professional esports on a global scale". A few months prior to the meeting with the IOC, Lyon and Outlaws teammate Shane "Rawkus" Flaherty spoke with Megyn Kelly about the Overwatch League in a segment on The Today Show.

== Personal life ==
Lyon was born in La Jolla neighborhood of San Diego, California, on July 28, 1996. Outside of esports, his interests include outdoor activities such as rock climbing and kayaking.^{1:40} Although Jake is known for being outspoken in and about Overwatch, he considers himself an introverted person, telling Blitz Esports "I always liked time alone and I never feel really relaxed unless I'm by myself". Lyon briefly studied economics at Denison University in Granville, Ohio before leaving to pursue a full-time career in esports.
