= Florida Mayhem =

American professional esports team

- Founded: July 12, 2017
- League: Overwatch League
- Region: West
- Team history: Misfits (2016–2017); Florida Mayhem (2017–2023)
- Based in: Miami–Orlando, United States
- Colors
- Owner: Misfits Gaming
- CEO: Ben Spoont
- Head coach: Jordan "Gunba" Graham
- Championships: 2023
- Main sponsor: Tezos
- Website: Official website

Uniforms

Florida Mayhem was an American professional Overwatch esports team based in Miami and Orlando, Florida. The team competed in the Overwatch League (OWL) as a member of the league's West Division. Founded in 2017, Florida Mayhem was one of the league's twelve founding members and was owned and operated by Florida-based esports organization Misfits Gaming and CEO Ben Spoont. The organization also ran Mayhem Academy, an academy team for the Mayhem that competed in Overwatch Contenders. The Mayhem made their first season playoffs appearance in franchise history in the 2020 season. Florida won their first OWL championship in the 2023 season after defeating the Houston Outlaws, 4–0, in the 2023 Grand Finals. The Mayhem was disbanded in October of 2023 following the end of the Overwatch League.

== Franchise history ==
The team that would become the Florida Mayhem was formed in June 2016 as the first foray into Overwatch for Misfits Gaming, after Misfits picked up the European team Graviton Surge. The original roster included Sebastian "Zebbosai" Olsson, who would play in the inaugural season of the Overwatch League as the main support player for the Mayhem.

On July 12, 2017, Overwatch developer Activision Blizzard officially announced that Misfits, which is partially owned by the NBA team Miami Heat, had acquired an Overwatch League franchise for the Miami–Orlando area. On November 2, the organization revealed that the franchise would be named the Florida Mayhem and announced the transfer of the existing Misfits Overwatch roster to the Mayhem. With no further roster moves, the Mayhem headed into the inaugural Overwatch League season with only six players, the minimum required for the Overwatch League and the fewest players among the 12 inaugural season teams.

On January 11, 2018, the Mayhem played their first Overwatch League match, a 1–3 loss to the London Spitfire. The following week, on January 19, they notched their first-ever victory after defeating the Shanghai Dragons 4–0; this would be their only win during Stage 1 of the season. On May 2, head coach Vytis "Mineral" Lasaitis temporarily stepped down from his position, citing that he had been experiencing "various health issues" and burnout since stage two. Assistant coach Choi "r2der" Hyun-jin and analyst Albert Yeh lead the team in his absence until his return at the beginning of Stage 4. The team ended the 2018 regular season with a 7–33 record, second-to-last in the League (ahead of only the winless Dragons).

The Mayhem were not able to find much more success in their 2019 season. After finishing Stage 1 with only one win, the Mayhem announced their intention to implement an all-Korean team and fired two coaches, including head coach Mineral. The team's struggles continued in Stage 2, as they did not win a single match. Prior to Stage 3, the Mayhem's all-Korean overhaul continued, as they made several roster changes. Florida hired Oh "Unread" Nam-hun amidst a one-win Stage 3 as the team's new head coach. The Mayhem found success in Stage 4, when the league implemented a 2-2-2 role lock, as they were able to win four of their final five matches.

For their 2020 season, the Mayhem debuted new colors, trading the yellow and red color scheme that the team had used for two years in favor of a 1980s Miami color scheme, featuring pink, teal, and black. The Mayhem opened the season going 7–4 heading into the May Melee tournament, where they reached the finals before being defeated by the San Francisco Shock. Midseason, OWL caster Sideshow joined the team on a 14 day contract after winning a Pharah duel against Yaki, who bet that Sideshow could not reach 5 eliminations before Yaki reached 20. Florida finished the season with 14 wins, 3 bonus wins from midseason tournaments, and 7 losses to claim the fourth seed in the North America season playoffs. A 0–3 loss to the Washington Justice on September 12 eliminated the Mayhem from the North America bracket.

The Mayhem's 2021 season began on April 17, 2021, against the Atlanta Reign in the May Melee qualifiers; they won their opener 1–3. Florida won three of their four qualifier matches and advanced to the regional knockouts. After defeating the Toronto Defiant and the Washington Justice in the regional knockouts, the Mayhem advanced to the interregional tournament bracket. In the first match in the double-elimination tournament, the Mayhem lost to the Shanghai Dragons, sending them to the lower bracket of the tournament. In the first round of the lower bracket, Florida defeated the Chengdu Hunters, but they lost, again, to the Dragons in the following round, eliminating them from the tournament. After the strong start to the season, Florida struggled to continue their success. Florida won only two more games in the season, finishing with a 5–11 record and did not qualify for the season playoffs.

Florida Mayhem's 2022 season started on May 5, 2022 with a game against the Atlanta Reign in the Kickoff Clash qualifiers, which they lost 3-1. Florida four of their six qualifier matches in the qualifiers, and therefore advanced to the main brackets. The Mayhem then lost their first match in the Upper Bracket Quarterfinals to the Atlanta Reign again with a matching scoreline of 3-1. The team then went on to win a match against the Washington Justice with a 1-3 scoreline. Their final match in the Kickoff Clash was a 3-1 loss against the Dallas Fuel. Florida Mayhem then played in the Midseason Madness Qualifiers, winning two out of the six of the matches, entering them into the main brackets. In the Upper Bracket Quarterfinals, they lost their first match to the Houston Outlaws 0-3. The Mayhem then won two more matches in the lower bracket before finally losing to the Toronto Defiant with a score of 2-3. After this start, Florida won ten out of their next 16 matches which allowed them to qualify for the playoffs. A 0-3 loss to the Seoul Dynasty, a 3-1 win against the Atlanta Reign, and the Hangzhou Spark eliminated Florida Mayhem in Lower Bracket Round 2 to end their 2022 season.

In Season 6 of the Overwatch League, the Florida Mayhem won their first OWL title. They defeated the Houston Outlaws with a 4-0 victory in the 2023 Grand Finals. This victory was highlighted by strong from their DPS player MER1T, who earned the Grand Finals MVP award. This season not only marked the end of the Overwatch League's sixth season, but also the final season for the Florida Mayhem.

== Team identity ==
The Mayhem's branding was officially unveiled on November 2, 2017. The team's logo features the letter M inscribed in a bomb (representing competitive impact) with a palm tree-shaped fuse (representing Florida). The team colors were originally red, to pay homage to the original Misfits team; yellow, to represent Florida, the "Sunshine State;" and black, tying in with the Miami Heat. Prior to the 2020 season, the colors were changed to black, pink, and teal, similar to the Miami Vice-inspired alternate jerseys that were used in the 2019 season.

== Personnel ==
=== Head coaches ===
Handle	Name	Seasons	Record	Notes	Ref.
Mineral	Vytis Lasaitis	2018–2019	7–28 (.200)	Fired after seven games in 2019.	
Unread	Oh Nam-hun	2019	5–7 (.417)		
KuKi	Kim Dae-kuk	2020–2021	19–18 (.514)		
Gunba	Jordan Graham	2022–2023	26–14 (.650)		

== Awards and records ==
=== Seasons overview ===
Season	P	W	L	W%	Finish	Playoffs
2018	40	7	33	.175	6th, Atlantic	Did not qualify
2019	28	6	22	.214	10th, Atlantic	Did not qualify
2020	21	14	7	.667	3rd, North America	Lost in NA Lower Round 3, 0–3 (Justice)
2021	16	5	11	.313	10th, West	Did not qualify
2022	24	12	12	.500	7th, West	Lost in Lower Round 2, 1–3 (Spark)
2023	16	14	2	.875	2nd, West	OWL Champions, 4–0 (Outlaws)

=== Individual accomplishments ===
All-Star Game selections

- Sayaplayer (Ha Jeong-woo) – 2018, 2019
- Yaki (Kim Jun-ki) – 2020

All-Star Game head coaches

- KuKi (Kim Dae-kuk) – 2020

MVP Players

- Someone (Jeong-wan Ham) – 2023

== Academy team ==
On February 22, 2018, the Mayhem formally announced their academy team for Overwatch Contenders North America would be called "Mayhem Academy" (MA). In 2019 Season One, Mayhem Academy became the first team ever to defeat Fusion University, which had never lost a regular season or playoff match in three seasons of play. Mayhem Academy temporarily ceased play following 2019 Season One to "retool" the team as a whole. Many of the former MA players formed Revival, a team that competed in 2019 Season Two.

=== Seasons overview ===
Year	Season	Region	OWC regular season				OWC playoffs	Interregional
Year	Season	Region	Finish (Note: Placements prior to 2019 reflect standings in the team's respective group and not the entire region.)	Wins	Losses	Win %	OWC playoffs	Interregional
Mayhem Academy
2018	1	North America	4th	2	3	.400	Quarterfinals	
2018	2	North America	4th	2	3	.400	Quarterfinals	None held
2018	3	North America	5th	1	4	.200		None held
2019	1	North America East	1st	6	1	.857	Semifinals	
Regular season record				11	11	.500		
Playoff record				0	3	.000		
