= Houston Outlaws =

American professional esports team

- Founded: September 20, 2017
- Folded: November 10, 2023
- League: Overwatch League
- Region: West
- Team history: Houston Outlaws (2017–2023)
- Based in: Houston, United States
- Colors
- Owner: Beasley Media Group
- Main sponsor: H-E-B
- Website: Official website

Uniforms

The Houston Outlaws were an American professional Overwatch esports team based in Houston, Texas. The Outlaws competed in the Overwatch League (OWL) as a member of the league's West region. The Outlaws qualified for the season playoffs twice in their existence and reached the Grand Finals once, in 2023.

Founded in 2017, Houston Outlaws was one of the league's twelve founding members and was one of two professional Overwatch teams based in Texas (the other, Dallas Fuel). The Outlaws were established by OpTic Gaming and were later acquired by Infinite Esports. Immortals Gaming Club (IGC) acquired Infinite Esports in 2019, marking the first change of ownership of an OWL franchise. However, IGC already had ownership of Los Angeles Valiant, and while the League allowed IGC to operate both teams, the league had set strict standards to keep the teams independent. Subsequently, IGC sold the Outlaws to the Beasley Media Group in November 2019. In November 2023, following the closure of the Overwatch League. the Outlaws announced that they would no longer be competing in the Overwatch esports and instead shifted their focus to content and entertainment. Six months later, the organization entirely shut down.

== Franchise history ==
On September 20, 2017, Blizzard Entertainment officially announced that American esports organization OpTic Gaming had acquired the Houston-based franchise of the Overwatch League. Reports suggested that OpTic received an investment from Texas Rangers co-owner Neil Leibman to help fund the US$20 million franchise fee. On October 31, 2017, the franchise revealed its name, the Houston Outlaws, as well as their full 10-man roster and coaching staff.

On January 11, 2018, the Outlaws played their first regular season Overwatch League match, a 3–2 loss to the Philadelphia Fusion. One week later, on January 17, Houston claimed their first victory after sweeping the Shanghai Dragons 4–0. Houston went on to qualify for the Stage 1 playoffs but fell to the London Spitfire in the semifinals. Houston entered their last regular season match against the New York Excelsior, needing a win to keep their season playoff hopes alive. The Outlaws had a 2–1 lead after three matches, but New York won the next three straight to take the win 3–2. With consistent performances by tank player Austin "Muma" Wilmot and damage player Jiri "LiNkzr" Masalin throughout the season, the team finished in seventh place with a 22–18 regular season record.

The Outlaws made minimal roster additions entering the 2019 season, signing only damage player Dante "Danteh" Cruz. Houston struggled throughout the first half of the season, winning only three of their first 14 matches, including a winless Stage 2. After the All-Star break, the Outlaws rebounded, posting a 5–2 record in Stage 3, and qualified for the Stage 3 playoffs. However, the team lost to the Vancouver Titans, 0–3, in the quarterfinals. A 1–3 loss to the London Spitfire in Week 3 of Stage 4 officially eliminated the Outlaws from season playoff contention. Despite the strong Stage 3, Houston ended the season in 16th place with a 9–19 record.

In the middle of the 2019 season, the Outlaws changed ownership. On June 12, 2019, Immortals Gaming Club (IGC), the parent company of Immortals and Los Angeles Valiant, acquired Infinite Esports, the parent company of Houston Outlaws and OpTic Gaming, marking the first sale of any Overwatch League franchise. Both Riot Games and Activision Blizzard approved the sale; by OWL rules, one company may not own more than one OWL franchise, so IGC had to operate the Valiant and Outlaws as entirely separate entities, with oversight by OWL representatives, until IGC sold the Outlaws. In November 2019, IGC sold the Outlaws to the Beasley Media Group.

Prior to the start of the 2020 season, the Outlaws released head coach Kim "TaiRong" Tae-yeong; the team former Vancouver Titans assistant coach Harsha Bandi as their new head coach. The team lost several of their players, including de facto in-game communication leader Jacob "Jake" Lyon to retirement, while picking up a handful of veteran players. The team had their worst regular season performance in franchise history, finishing in 16th place with a 6–15 record. The team entered tied as the last seed in the North America play-in tournament. Houston lost to the Boston Uprising, 1–3, on September 3 in the first round of the play-ins, ending their season.

In the offseason preceding the 2021 season, the Outlaws signed former San Francisco Shock assistant coach Jae "Junkbuck" Choi to be a co-head coach along with their current head coach Harsha Bandi and promoted Matt "coolmatt" Iorio as the organization's new general manager. The team overhauled their roster, releasing all of their players except for damage players Danteh and João Pedro "Hydration" Goes Telles. Among their many signings, the Outlaws picked up Harrisburg University support player Enrique "Joobi" Triana, marking the first time that collegiate player had been directly signed to the Overwatch League, and signed Jake back to the team as a player and coach. The Outlaws found success in the first half of the season, going a combined 7–1 in the first two tournament cycles, the May Melee and June Joust. However, they were defeated in the regional knockouts both times by the Dallas Fuel. Houston failed to advance to the regional knockouts in either of the final two tournament cycles of the season, finishing the regular season with an 11–5 record. Finishing in fifth place in the Western region, the team advanced to the Western play-in tournament. Houston was defeated by the Washington Justice in the play-in finals, eliminating them from postseason contention.

On November 10, 2023, the Outlaws announced that they would be leaving competitive Overwatch and shift to content creation. Six months later, on July 26, 2024, the organization announced its closure.

== Team identity ==
On October 30, 2017, OpTic Gaming announced that the team Houston-based team would be called the Houston Outlaws. The organization chose the name "to honor the region's rebellious and fearless nature in the face of all challenges, channeling its history and fight for independence to create a name and identity that is as large-and-in-charge as its hometown."

The design of the logo was a collaboration between OpTic Gaming and the Overwatch Development team. It depicts two revolvers arranged in the shape of the classic Texan longhorn skull, with a star in between the horns. The two revolvers forming the skull "symbolizes the strength of the team and the city it represents," while the single star "represents the team's pride in being a part of the Lone Star State."

The colors of the logo, green and black, symbolize the "Green Wall", the name of OpTic's esports fan base. "We're excited for the Houston Outlaws to join the Green Wall family," said Hector Rodriguez. "All of our fans live to compete—to be louder than everyone else and to deafen the competition with our skilled play and enthusiasm. The Houston Outlaws will continue our historical dominance in esports and introduce a new meaning of 'community' to our fans in Texas."

== Sponsors ==
In May 2018, the Outlaws, revealed their first partnership, a sponsorship agreement with telecommunications provider T-Mobile, a company that was already a sponsor of the Overwatch League itself. The deal included a number perks to Houston Outlaws fans, as well a new behind-the-scenes content series. Further, in May of that year, the Outlaws announced they were partnering with gaming peripheral provider Turtle Beach, previously a sponsor of the Outlaws' parent organization OpTic Gaming. In the Spring of 2019, the Outlaws announced two new partnerships, one with gaming retailer GameStop and the other with Texas-based grocery chain H-E-B.

== Personnel ==
=== Head coaches ===
Handle	Name	Seasons	Record	Notes	Ref.
TaiRong	Kim Tae-yeong	2018–2019	33–37 (.471)		
Harsha	Harsha Bandi	2020–2021	17–20 (.459)	Co-head coach with Junkbuck in 2021.	
Junkbuck	Choi Jae-won	2021–2022	27–13 (.675)	Co-head coach with Harsha in 2021.	
Neko	Park Se-hyeon	2023	13-3 (.813)		

== Awards and records ==
=== Seasons overview ===
Season	P	W	L	W%	Finish	Playoffs
2018	40	22	18	.550	5th, Atlantic	Did not qualify
2019	28	9	19	.321	6th, Atlantic	Did not qualify
2020	21	6	15	.286	7th, North America	Did not qualify
2021	16	11	5	.688	6th, West	Did not qualify
2022	24	16	8	.667	4th, West	Lost in Lower Final, 0–3 (Shock)
2023	16	13	3	.813	2nd, West	Lost in Grand Finals, 0–4 (Mayhem)

=== Individual accomplishments ===
All-Star Game selections

- Muma (Austin Wilmot) – 2018
- Danteh (Dante Cruz) – 2019, 2020
- Hydration (João Pedro Goes Telles) – 2020
- Jecse (Lee Seung-soo) – 2020

== Academy team ==
Founded on February 21, 2018, to compete in Overwatch Contenders North America, the Outlaws' academy team initially went under the moniker "OpTic Academy".

On July 2, 2018, one day prior to Season Two starting, the team announced they would be rebranding themselves as "GG Esports Academy". However, in October 2018, GG Esports Academy was removed from Overwatch Contenders for failing to submit a final roster by the roster deadline. The team submitted an extension request, but it was denied by Blizzard.
