= Boston Uprising =

American professional esports team

- Founded: July 12, 2017
- League: Overwatch League
- Region: Atlantic (2018–2020) West (2021–2023)
- Team history: Boston Uprising (2017–2023)
- Based in: Boston, Massachusetts, US
- Colors
- Owner: Robert Kraft
- General manager: Aaron "PRE" Heckman
- Affiliation: Uprising Academy
- Website: Official website

Uniforms

Boston Uprising were an American professional Overwatch esports team based in Boston, Massachusetts. The team competed in the Overwatch League (OWL) as a member of the league's West region. Founded in 2017, Boston was one of the League's twelve founding teams. The team was owned by Robert Kraft of the Kraft Group, who also owns the National Football League's New England Patriots and Uprising Academy, an academy team for the Uprising that compete in Overwatch Contenders.

Boston became the first team in Overwatch League history to go undefeated during a regular season stage, finishing 10–0 in Stage 3 of the 2018 season. After reaching the playoffs and finishing fifth in the final season standings in 2018, the organization returned to the playoffs only one other time, in 2023, the final season of the League.

== Franchise history ==
On July 12, 2017, Blizzard Entertainment officially announced that the Kraft Group had acquired the Boston-based franchise of the Overwatch League. On the decision to purchase the Esports franchise, Robert Kraft said in a statement, "We have been exploring the esports market for a number of years and have been waiting for the right opportunity to enter. The incredible global success of Overwatch since its launch, coupled with the League's meticulous focus on a structure and strategy that clearly represents the future of esports made this the obvious entry point for the Kraft Group." In August 2017, the Kraft Group announced Chris "HuK" Loranger would be serving as and president of gaming for the franchise, where he would "oversee player acquisition, training, and daily operations". On October 25, 2017, the Uprising announced their full roster, consisting of eight players.

=== Early years: 2018–present ===
Boston Uprising's first regular season OWL match was a 1–3 loss to the New York Excelsior on January 11, 2018. Boston found their franchise's first-ever regular season win a day later, after defeating the Florida Mayhem, 4–0. In April 2018, Uprising player Jonathan "DreamKazper" Sanchez was indefinitely suspended from the Overwatch League following allegations of sexual misconduct involving a minor. Shortly after, on April 9, Boston Uprising terminated his contract. Following, Kwon "Striker" Nam-joo took over DreamKazper's starting position – a move that ultimately benefited the team. Throughout Stage 3 of the season, the Striker-led Uprising did not lose a single match, going 10–0, to become the first team to go undefeated in a stage. Boston reached the Stage 3 finals; however, they lost the finals match against the New York Excelsior. Prior to the start of Stage 4, Overwatch underwent a balancing update, as well as the introduction of a new hero, which would significantly reduced Striker's effectiveness. Additionally, head coach Park "Crusty" Dae-hee left the team to join the San Francisco Shock. The Uprising finished the regular season in third place with a 26–14 record. The Uprising's postseason came to a quick end, as they were defeated in the quarterfinals by the Philadelphia Fusion, two series to one.

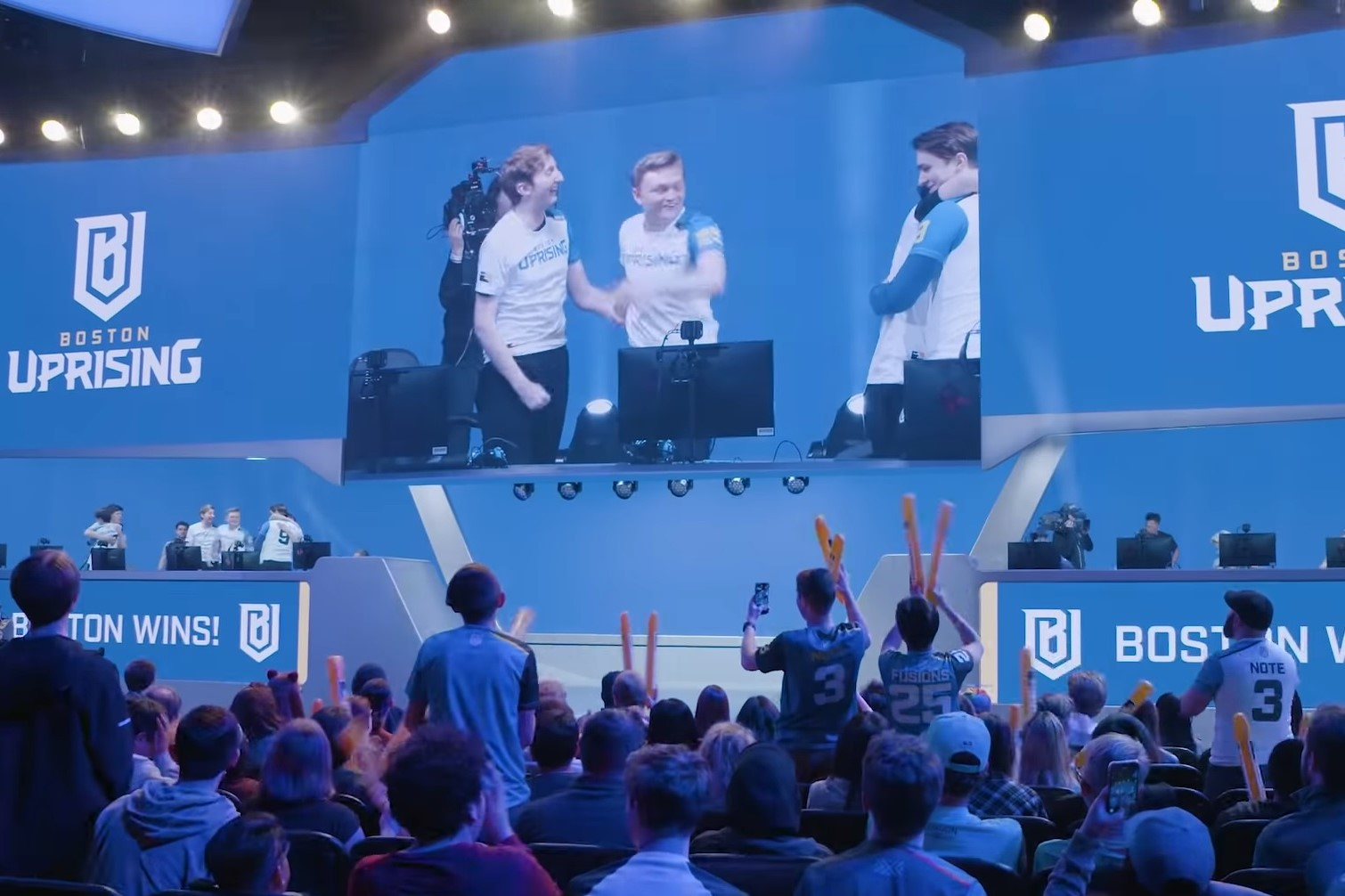
Boston Uprising on stage in 2019

Boston went through major roster changes prior to the 2019 season, including the departure of analyst Mohid "MrBleeple" Asjid and the addition of Jordan "Gunba" Graham. Among other signings, the team picked up tank player Cameron "Fusions" Bosworth, who had recently performed well at the 2018 Overwatch World Cup. Additionally, the Uprising transferred Striker to the San Francisco Shock and tank Noh "Gamsu" Young-jin to the Shanghai Dragons. Throughout the entire 2019 season, the Uprising went without a head coach. Through the first half of the season, the Uprising posted a middling 7–7 record. However, in the second half of the season, they only picked up a single win, finishing regular season in 19th place with an 8–20 record.

Following the 2019 season, the Uprising picked up former Florida Mayhem coach Vytis "Mineral" Lasaitis as their new head coach, marking the first time that the organization had a head coach in 16 months. The team released all but three of their players: Fusion, tank Park "Axxiom" Min-sub, and damage player Kelsey "Colourhex" Birse. Boston signed mostly rookies to their squad, leaving many analysts predicting them to finish near the bottom of the standings. Throughout the season, Boston parted ways with four players, and tank player Park "Axxiom" Min-seob became inactive for medical reasons. The instability of the roster proved too much for the team to overcome, as Boston ended the season with a league-worst 2–19 record and found no success in any of the league's midseason tournaments or in the postseason play-in tournament.

Prior to the 2021 season, the Uprising signed Kim "Lori" Seung-hyun as their new head coach, while Mineral took on a management position within the organization. The team retained four of the players from the previous season, including Colourhex, Fusions, support Seo "Myunb0ng" Sang-min, and tank Leyton "Punk" Gilchrist, while signings a mixture of veterans and rookies. The Boston Uprising competed in the SteelSeries Invitational, coming in second place after losing to the Los Angeles Gladiators 0-3. Behind a stable roster throughout the season, Boston finished in 15th place with a 7–9 record, marking their best regular season winning percentage since 2018. The team qualified for the Western region play-in tournament; however, they lost in the first round to the Toronto Defiant, failing to reach the season playoffs.

In the following offseason, the Uprising parted ways with six players, including Colourhex, Myunb0ng, and Fusions, who retired from professional Overwatch altogether. Boston signed and picked up several new players; most notably Striker was signed back to the team after he retired in the middle of 2021 season. However, three weeks into the season, Striker was dropped from the team.

== Team identity ==
On October 25, 2017, the franchise name was revealed as the Boston Uprising; the name "Uprising" was selected in honor of Boston's resilient forefathers and their legacy in the American Revolution which laid the foundation of the city. They also unveiled the team's logo and blue-yellow-black color scheme, with the latter drawing inspiration from the colors found in Boston's city flag. The logo is a shield surrounding a bold "B"—a letter that is synonymous with the city of Boston.

== Sponsors ==
In late April 2018, the team revealed their first partnership, a shaving product sponsor, with Boston-based Gillette. The deal included a number of digital and social content initiatives, as well as having the Gillette logo featured on the team's practice jerseys and training facility.

On October 31, 2018, the team added Bose as a sponsor, joining other Kraft-owned sports franchises and Boston teams supported by the Boston-based audio company.

== Personnel ==
=== Head coaches ===
Handle	Name	Seasons	Record	Notes	Ref.
Crusty	Park Dae-hee	2018	22–8 (.733)	Released after 30 games in 2018	
Mineral	Vytis Lasaitis	2020	2–19 (.095)		
Lori	Kim Seung-hyun	2021–2022	12–21 (.364)	Released after 17 games in 2022	
Ascoft	Valentin Wulfman	2022	5–2 (.714)	Interim	
Dongsu	Shin Dong-soo	2023	6–2 (.750)	Released after eight games in 2023	
Mobydik	Sim Seung-bo	2023	11–5 (.688)		

== Awards and records ==
=== Seasons overview ===
Season	P	W	L	W%	Finish	Playoffs
2018	40	26	14	.650	2nd, Atlantic	Lost in Quarterfinals, 1–2 (Fusion)
2019	28	8	20	.286	9th, Atlantic	Did not qualify
2020	21	2	19	.095	10th, North America	Did not qualify
2021	16	7	9	.438	9th, West	Did not qualify
2022	24	10	14	.417	10th, West	Did not qualify
2023	16	11	5	.688	4th, West	Lost in Semifinals, 1–3 (Mayhem)

=== Individual accomplishments ===
All-Star Game selections

- Gamsu (Noh Young-jin) – 2018
- Neko (Park Se-hyun) – 2018
- Striker (Gwon Nam-ju) – 2018
- Fusions (Cameron Bosworth) – 2019
- Myunbong (Seo Sang-min) – 2020

== Academy team ==
On February 19, 2018, the Uprising announced a partnership with Toronto Esports Club's Overwatch Contenders team. In November 2018, following the unveiling of the Toronto Defiant in the Overwatch League, the league informed the Uprising they needed to change their name. Rather than change their name, the Toronto Esports team decided to pull out of Contenders completely, citing not only issues with the naming request but new changes in the Contenders format. According to their president Ryan Pallet, the organization was given a six-week notice to change their name. The Kraft organization still owns the rights to the players, coaches and the Contenders slot held by the team, which is officially competing under the name "Uprising Academy."
