= Chengdu Hunters =

Chinese professional esports team

Chengdu Hunters 成都猎人
- Founded: 2018
- Folded: 2023
- League: Overwatch League
- Region: East
- Team history: Chengdu Hunters (2018–present)
- Based in: Chengdu, China
- Colors
- Owner: Huya, Inc.
- Head coach: Zhang "yaoxie" Jihang
- General manager: Chen "Cc" Jiancheng
- Affiliation: Team Chaser
- Main sponsor: Huya
- Website: Official website

Uniforms

Chinese name
- Simplified Chinese: 成都猎人
- Traditional Chinese: 成都獵人
Transcriptions
Standard Mandarin
- Hanyu Pinyin: Chéngdū Lièrén

Chengdu Hunters (simplified Chinese: 成都猎人; traditional Chinese: 成都獵人; pinyin: Chéngdū Lièrén) were a Chinese professional Overwatch esports team based in Chengdu, China. The Hunters competed in the Overwatch League (OWL) as a member of the league's East region. The team was owned by Huya, Inc., a Chinese interactive broadcast platform and was operated by Royal Never Give Up (RNG) throughout the 2019 and 2020 OWL seasons. The Hunters also formerly had partnership with Overwatch Contenders the team LGE.Huya to act as the team's academy team. Founded in 2018, Chengdu Hunters began play as one of eight expansion teams in 2019 and was one of four professional Overwatch teams in China. Since inception, the Hunters had qualified for the season playoffs once, in 2021. The team disbanded in 2023.

== Franchise history ==
On September 7, 2018, Activision Blizzard announced that domestic game livestream platform Huya, Inc. had purchased an expansion team based in Chengdu, later revealed as Chengdu Hunters, for the Overwatch League's second season. While the team was owned by Huya, they would be operated by Chinese esports organization Royal Never Give Up. The Hunters signed an all-Chinese roster and staff, aside from two Taiwanese members, which would be led by head coach Wang "RUI" Xingrui.

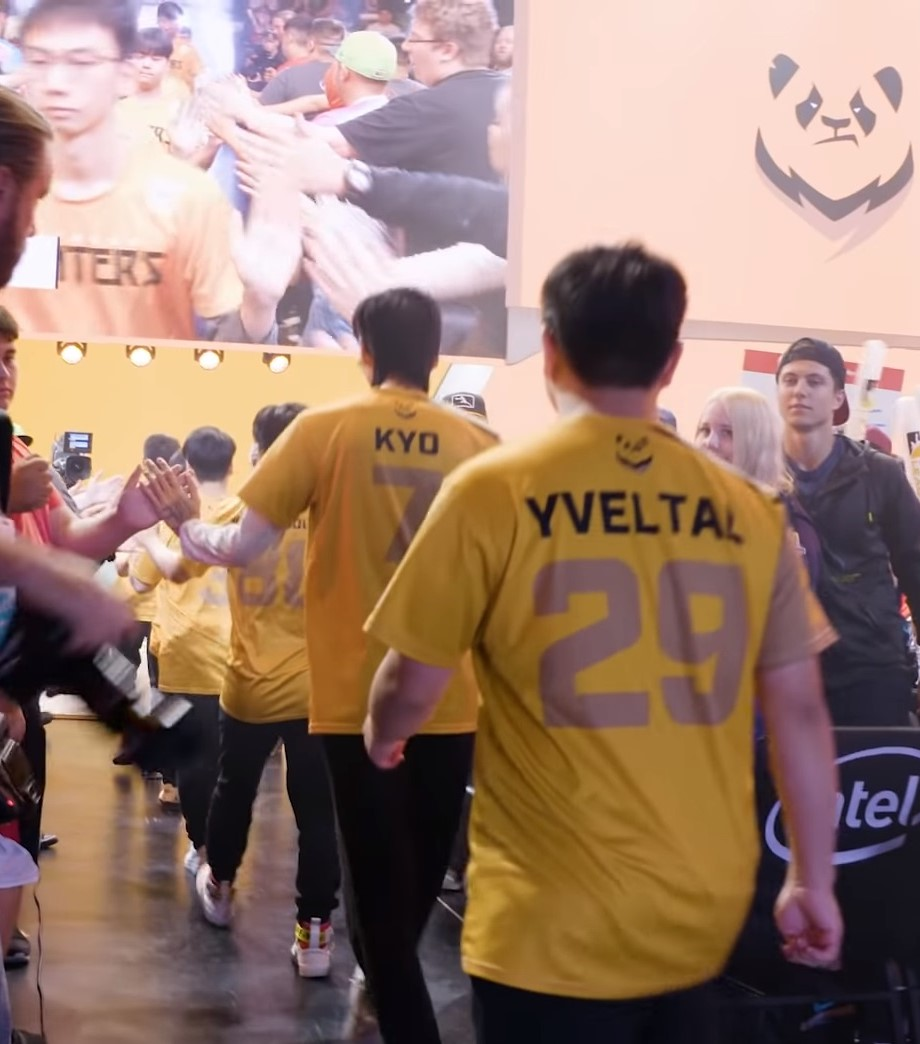
Hunters walking on stage in 2019

Chengdu's first ever regular season OWL match was a 3–2 victory over the Guangzhou Charge on February 15, 2019. After posting three consecutive 3–4 records for the first three stages of the season, the Hunters failed to qualify for any of the stage playoffs. Chengdu finished the regular season with a 13–15 record and qualified for the play-in tournament. However, they were eliminated in the first round of the play-in tournament after a loss to the Guangzhou Charge.

In the offseason preceding the 2020 season, head coach Wang "RUI" Xingrui announced that he would be stepping down from his position due to health issues. The Hunters promoted assistant coach Chang "Ray" Chia-Hua and signed former LGE.Huya head coach Wu "Dokkaebi" Xiuqing as the team's new co-head coaches. Chengdu made several roster changes prior to the season, including officially signing rookie Xin "Leave" Huang. Due to the COVID-19 pandemic, the Hunters were not able to play their first match of the season several months after the season officially began. Prior to the final midseason tournament of the season, the Countdown Cup, Chen Murong was signed as the team's new co-head, replacing Wu "Dokkaebi" Xiuqing. Chengdu finished the season in sixth, out of seventh, place in the league's Asia region, with an effective 8–14 record. The Hunters defeated the London Spitfire in the first round of the Asia play-in tournament; however, they lost to the New York Excelsior in the following round, ending their season.

Entering the 2021 season, Xingrui "RUI" Wang was brought back as the team's new head coach. The Hunters six players in the offseason, all of whom were rookies. Additionally, the Hunters ended their partnership with Royal Never Give Up, who had been operating the team since its inception. The Hunters qualified for three of the league's four midseason tournaments, reaching the finals twice, but they failed to secure a title in any of them. At the end of the regular season, Huang "Leave" Xin won the season's Most Valuable Player award. Chengdu had their best regular season finish in franchise history, placing as the third seed in the season playoffs. They defeated the Atlanta Reign in the first round of the double-elimination tournament. However consecutive losses to the Dallas Fuel and San Francisco Shock ended their playoff run.

In January 2023, the Hunters posted on their Twitter, "Goodbye and see you again." The post followed the end of the licensing agreement between Activision Blizzard and NetEase, which disallowed Overwatch 2 to be played in China. On April 13, 2023, the Overwatch League announced that the Hunters would not be competing at the start of the 2023 season. On May 3, 2023, The Esports Advocate reported that the Chengdu Hunters had been disbanded.

== Team identity ==
On November 12, 2018, the Chengdu Hunters brand was officially unveiled. The team name was chosen "as a symbol of the team's dedication to pursuing the honor of the league." The logo, a black and gold giant panda, was chosen because "it is the national treasure of China, the symbol of Chengdu, and a symbol of peace and good luck. At the same time, the panda also boasts powerful fighting strength and represents the Chinese spirit of perseverance, and collectively with the team's name, represents the team's determination to achieve victory." The colors represent vigor and steadiness, and contain the main colors of Huya and RNG, meant to represent the collaboration of the two companies.

== Personnel ==
=== Head coaches ===
Handle	Name	Seasons	Record	Notes	Ref.
Rui	Wang Xingrui	2019	13–15 (.464)		
Ray	Chang Chia-Hua	2020	7–14 (.333)	Co-head coach with Dokkaebi. Co-head coach with Chen.	
Dokkaebi	Wu Xiuqing	2020	7–14 (.333)	Co-head coach with Ray. Released prior to 2020 postseason.	
Chen	Chen Murong	2020	0–0 (–)	Co-head coach with Ray.	
Rui	Wang Xingrui	2021	11–5 (.688)		
yaoxie	Zhang Jihang	2022	9–15 (.375)		

== Awards and records ==
=== Seasons overview ===
Season	P	W	L	W%	Finish	Playoffs
2019	28	13	15	.464	8th, Pacific	Did not qualify
2020	21	7	14	.333	9th, Asia	Did not qualify
2021	16	11	5	.688	2nd, East	Lost in Lower Round 2, 2–3 (Shock)
2022	24	9	15	.375	6th, East	Did not qualify

=== Individual accomplishments ===
Season MVP

- Leave (Xin Huang) – 2021

Role Star selections

- Leave (Xin Huang) – 2021

All-Star Game selections

- Yveltal (Li Xianyao) – 2019
- Ameng (Menghan Ding) – 2019, 2020
- JinMu (Yi Hu) – 2019

== Academy team ==
On January 27, 2019, LinGan e-Sports Club announced their partnership with the Chengdu Hunters and became the academy team. LinGan e-Sports changed the name of their Overwatch team to LGE.Huya.
