= List of London Spitfire players =

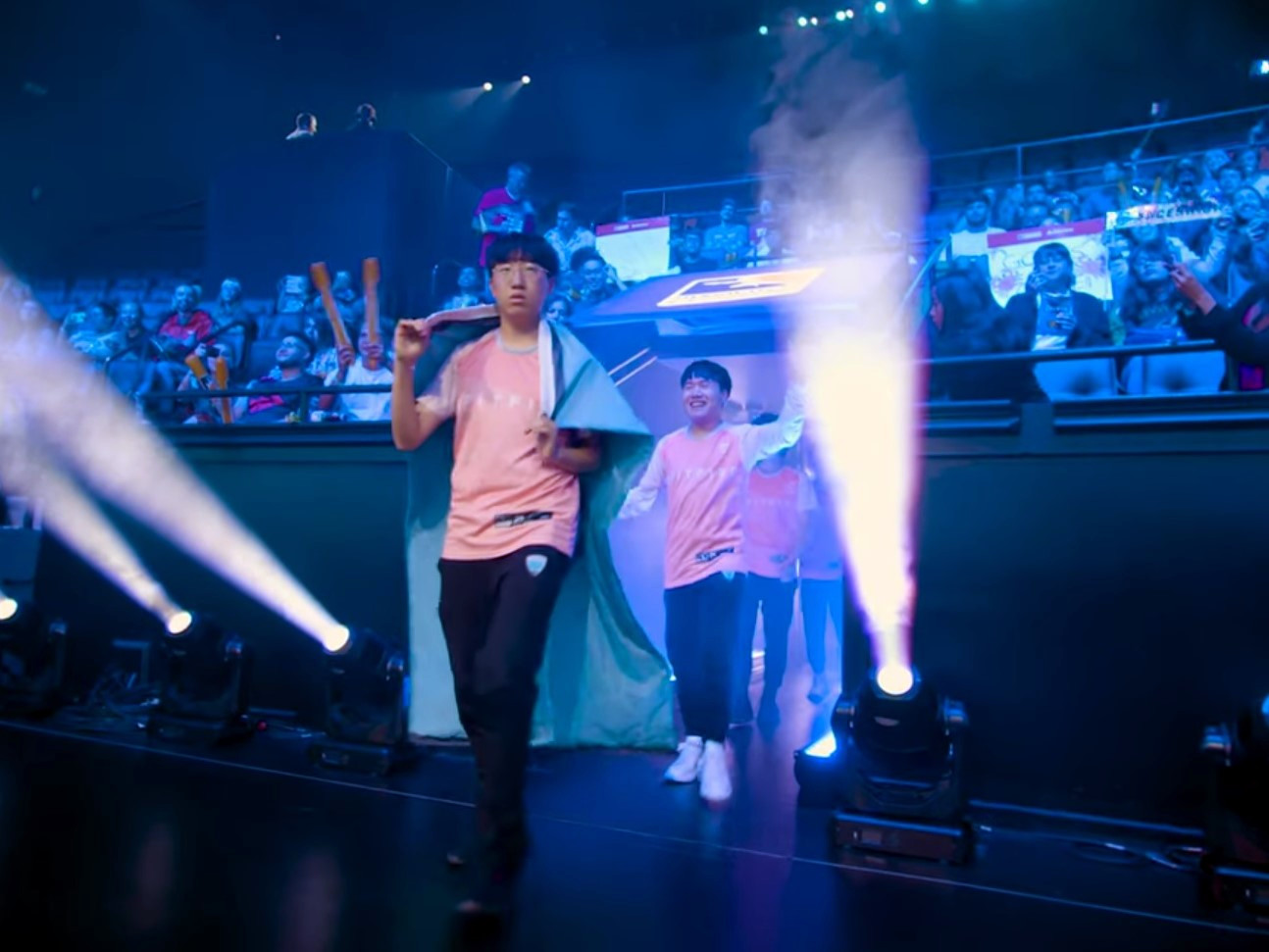
London Spitfire players walking out to the stage for a match in 2019.

London Spitfire is a British esports team founded in 2017 that competes in the Overwatch League (OWL). The Spitfire began playing competitive Overwatch in the 2018 season.

All rostered players during the OWL season (including the playoffs) are included, even if they did not make an appearance.

== All-time roster ==
As of December 15, 2021

Handle	Name	Role	Country	Seasons	Ref.
Admiral	Oliver Vahar	Support	Estonia	2022–present	
ALTHOUGH	Jung Hyeon-wook	Damage	South Korea	2020	
Babel	Park Sang-jun	Damage	South Korea	2020	
Backbone	Jamie O'Neill	Damage	Great Britain	2022–present	
Bdosin	Seungtae Choi	Support	South Korea	2018–2019	
BERNAR	Shin Se-won	Tank	South Korea	2020	
birdring	Jihyeok Kim	Damage	South Korea	2018–2019	
blasé	Jeffrey Tsang	Damage	United States	2021	
Clestyn	Cho Gun-hee	Tank	South Korea	2020	
Closer	Wonsik Jung	Support	South Korea	2018	
Fissure	Chanhyung Baek	Tank	South Korea	2018	
Fury	Junho Kim	Tank	South Korea	2018–2019	
Fuze	Kim Tae-hoon	Support	South Korea	2020	
Gesture	Jaehui Hong	Tank	South Korea	2018–2019	
Glister	Lim Gil-seong	Damage	South Korea	2020	
Guard	Heedong Lee	Damage	South Korea	2019	
HaGoPeun	Hyeonwoo Jo	Support	South Korea	2018	
Highly	Lee Sung-hyeok	Support	South Korea	2020	
Hadi	Hadi Daniel Bleinagel	Tank	Germany	2021–present	
Hooreg	Dongeun Lee	Damage	South Korea	2018	
Hybrid	Dominic Grove	Damage	Great Britain	2021	
Jihun	Kim Ji-hun	Tank	South Korea	2020	
JMAC	Choi Dae-han	Tank	South Korea	2020	
Kellex	Kristian Keller	Support	Denmark	2021	
Krillin	Yunghoon Jung	Support	South Korea	2019–2020	
Molf1g	Mikkel Djernes	Tank	Denmark	2021	
NUS	Jongseok Kim	Support	South Korea	2018–2019	
Poko	Gael Gouzerch	Tank	France	2022–present	
Profit	Park Joon-yeong	Damage	South Korea	2018–2019	
provide	Owen Warner	Support	Great Britain	2022–present	
Quatermain	Song Ji-hoon	Support	South Korea	2019	
Rascal	Dongjun Kim	Damage	South Korea	2018	
Ripa	Riku Toivanen	Support	Finland	2021	
SanGuiNar	Lim Kyu-min	Support	South Korea	2020	
Schwi	Lee Dong-jae	Damage	South Korea	2020	
Shax	Johannes Nielsen	Damage	Denmark	2021–present	
SparkR	William Andersson	Damage	Sweden	2021–present	
TiZi	Janghyeon Hwang	Tank	South Korea	2018	
WooHyaL	Seunghyun Seong	Tank	South Korea	2018	
