= 2018 New York Excelsior season =

- Atlantic Division champions
- Head coach: Yu Hyeon-sang
- Owner: Jeff Wilpon
- Division: Atlantic

Results
- Record: 34–6 (.850)
- Place: Atlantic: 1st; League: 1st
- Stage 1 Playoffs: Finals
- Stage 2 Playoffs: Champions
- Stage 3 Playoffs: Champions
- Stage 4 Playoffs: Finals
- Season Playoffs: Semifinals
- Total Earnings: $650,000

The 2018 New York Excelsior season was the first season of New York Excelsior's existence in the Overwatch League. The team finished the league-leading regular season record of 34–6.

New York qualified for all four of the Stage Playoffs. The team lost in the Stage 1 finals to the London Spitfire, won in the Stage 2 finals against Philadelphia Fusion, won in the Stage 3 finals against Boston Uprising, and lost in the Stage 4 finals against the Los Angeles Valiant. The team also qualified for the Season Playoffs, but lost to the Philadelphia Fusion in the semifinals.

== Preceding offseason ==
On October 30, 2017, New York Excelsior unveiled their inaugural season roster, consisting of the following players:

- Hong "Ark" Yeon-jun
- Song "Janus" Jun-Hwa
- Bang "JJonak" Seong-hyun
- Kim "Libero" Hae-seong
- Kim "Mano" Dong-gyu
- Kim "MekO" Tae-hong
- Kim "Pine" Do-hyeon
- Park "Saebyeolbe" Jong-ryeol

The team also announced the signings of coaches Yu "Pavane" Hyeon-sang and Kim "WizardHyeong" Hyeong-seok, and Meta Athena's Kim "Libero" Hae-seong.

== Review ==
On January 11, the Excelsior played their first regular season Overwatch League match in a 3–1 victory over the Boston Uprising. They would end Stage 1 of the 2018 Season with a 9–1 record, earning them the top spot and first-round bye in the Stage 1 Playoffs. However, the team lost in the finals to the London Spitfire (3–2) in a reverse sweep.

Stage 2 played out much like Stage 1 for New York, as the team went on to post again a 9–1 record and a first-round bye into the Stage 2 Playoffs. Also like Stage 1, the playoff finals ended in a 3–2 reverse sweep, but this time New York was on the winning side, defeating the Philadelphia Fusion on March 25 to claim the Stage 2.

In Stage 3, New York once again posted a 9–1 record, giving them the second seed for the Stage 3 Playoffs. In the semifinals, the Excelsior swept the Los Angeles Valiant 3–0. The team won in the Stage 3 finals against Boston Uprising in another 3–0 sweep, giving New York back-to-back stage titles.

New York posted their worst record (7–3) in Stage 4, but still claimed the third seed for the Stage 4 Playoffs. Their first matchup was in the semifinals against the Dallas Fuel, in which the Excelsior won 3–2. However, they lost in the Stage 4 finals against the Los Angeles Valiant by a score of 1–3.

New York ended their season with a league-leading 34–6 record and qualified for the Season Playoffs prior to the beginning of Stage 4. The team had a first-round bye and faced the Philadelphia Fusion in the semifinals on July 18 and 21. New York lost both matchups by scores of 0–3 and 2–3, eliminating them from the playoffs.

On July 11, 2018, Blizzard officially named support player Bang "JJonak" Seong-hyun the inaugural Overwatch League season MVP.

== Final roster ==
2018 New York Excelsior roster
Players
Coaches

Role	No.	Handle	Name	Nationality
Damage	9	Saebyeolbe	Park Jong-ryeol	South Korea
Damage	10	Libero	Kim Hae-seong	South Korea
Tank	1	Janus	Song Jun-hwa	South Korea
Tank	7	Mano	Kim Dong-gyu	South Korea
Tank	11	MekO	Kim Tae-hong	South Korea
Support	2	ArK	Hong Yeon-jun	South Korea
Support	44	JJoNak	Bang Seong-hyun	South Korea
Support	97	Anamo	Jung Tae-sung	South Korea
Flex	21	Pine	Kim Do-hyeon	South Korea

Head coach

- Yu Hyeon-sang

Legend:
- (I) Inactive
- (S) Suspended
- (2W) Two-way player
- Substitute
- (injured) Injury / Illness

Latest roster transaction: March 30, 2018.

=== Transactions ===
Transactions of/for players on the roster during the 2018 regular season:

- On March 30, Excelsior signed Jung "Anamo" Tae-sung.

== Standings ==
=== Record by stage ===
Stage	Pld	W	L	Pct	MW	ML	MT	MD	Pos
1	10	9	1	.900	31	10	2	+21	1
2	10	9	1	.900	34	9	0	+25	1
3	10	9	1	.900	33	11	0	+22	2
4	10	7	3	.700	28	13	2	+15	3
Overall	40	34	6	.850	126	43	4	+83	1
Qualified for playoffs

=== League ===
Pos	Div	Team	Pld	W	L	PCT	MW	ML	MT	MD	Qualification
1	ATL	New York Excelsior	40	34	6	0.850	126	43	4	+83	Advance to season playoffs semifinals
2	PAC	Los Angeles Valiant	40	27	13	0.675	100	64	7	+36	Advance to season playoffs semifinals
3	ATL	Boston Uprising	40	26	14	0.650	99	71	3	+28	Advance to season playoffs quarterfinals
4	PAC	Los Angeles Gladiators	40	25	15	0.625	96	72	3	+24	Advance to season playoffs quarterfinals
5	ATL	London Spitfire	40	24	16	0.600	102	69	3	+33	Advance to season playoffs quarterfinals
6	ATL	Philadelphia Fusion	40	24	16	0.600	93	80	2	+13	Advance to season playoffs quarterfinals
7	ATL	Houston Outlaws	40	22	18	0.550	94	77	2	+17	
8	PAC	Seoul Dynasty	40	22	18	0.550	91	78	3	+13	
9	PAC	San Francisco Shock	40	17	23	0.425	77	84	5	−7	
10	PAC	Dallas Fuel	40	12	28	0.300	58	100	7	−42	
11	ATL	Florida Mayhem	40	7	33	0.175	42	120	5	−78	
12	PAC	Shanghai Dragons	40	0	40	0.000	21	141	2	−120	

Source: The Overwatch League
Rules for classification: 1) winning percentage; 2) map differential; 3) head-to-head map differential; 4) head-to-head record

== Game log ==
=== Preseason ===
2018 preseason game log
Preseason (1–1)

1	December 07	New York Excelsior	1	–	3	Boston Uprising	Burbank, CA

2	December 09	Seoul Dynasty	3	–	1	New York Excelsior	Burbank, CA

=== Regular season ===
2018 game log (Regular season record: 34–6)
Stage 1 (9–1)

1	January 11	Boston Uprising	1	–	3	New York Excelsior	Burbank, CA

2	January 13	New York Excelsior	3	–	1	Houston Outlaws	Burbank, CA

3	January 18	New York Excelsior	3	–	0	Los Angeles Valiant	Burbank, CA

4	January 20	Los Angeles Gladiators	0	–	4	New York Excelsior	Burbank, CA

5	January 25	Philadelphia Fusion	3	–	2	New York Excelsior	Burbank, CA

6	January 26	Seoul Dynasty	2	–	3	New York Excelsior	Burbank, CA

7	February 01	New York Excelsior	4	–	0	Shanghai Dragons	Burbank, CA

8	February 03	Dallas Fuel	1	–	3	New York Excelsior	Burbank, CA

9	February 08	Florida Mayhem	0	–	4	New York Excelsior	Burbank, CA

10	February 10	New York Excelsior	3	–	2	London Spitfire	Burbank, CA

Stage 2 (9–1)

11	February 22	New York Excelsior	3	–	1	Florida Mayhem	Burbank, CA

12	February 23	London Spitfire	3	–	2	New York Excelsior	Burbank, CA

13	March 01	New York Excelsior	4	–	0	Boston Uprising	Burbank, CA

14	March 03	Houston Outlaws	0	–	4	New York Excelsior	Burbank, CA

15	March 09	New York Excelsior	3	–	1	Philadelphia Fusion	Burbank, CA

16	March 10	New York Excelsior	4	–	0	San Francisco Shock	Burbank, CA

17	March 14	New York Excelsior	3	–	2	Seoul Dynasty	Burbank, CA

18	March 15	Shanghai Dragons	0	–	4	New York Excelsior	Burbank, CA

19	March 22	New York Excelsior	3	–	2	Dallas Fuel	Burbank, CA

20	March 24	Los Angeles Valiant	0	–	4	New York Excelsior	Burbank, CA

Stage 3 (9–1)

21	April 05	Florida Mayhem	0	–	4	New York Excelsior	Burbank, CA

22	April 07	New York Excelsior	4	–	0	London Spitfire	Burbank, CA

23	April 12	Boston Uprising	3	–	2	New York Excelsior	Burbank, CA

24	April 14	New York Excelsior	3	–	2	Houston Outlaws	Burbank, CA

25	April 19	Philadelphia Fusion	2	–	3	New York Excelsior	Burbank, CA

26	April 21	New York Excelsior	3	–	2	Los Angeles Gladiators	Burbank, CA

27	April 26	San Francisco Shock	1	–	3	New York Excelsior	Burbank, CA

28	April 28	Seoul Dynasty	0	–	4	New York Excelsior	Burbank, CA

29	May 03	Dallas Fuel	0	–	4	New York Excelsior	Burbank, CA

30	May 04	New York Excelsior	3	–	1	Shanghai Dragons	Burbank, CA

Stage 4 (7–3)

31	May 17	New York Excelsior	3	–	0	Florida Mayhem	Burbank, CA

32	May 19	London Spitfire	1	–	3	New York Excelsior	Burbank, CA

33	May 25	New York Excelsior	4	–	0	Seoul Dynasty	Burbank, CA

34	May 26	Shanghai Dragons	0	–	4	New York Excelsior	Burbank, CA

35	May 30	New York Excelsior	4	–	0	Philadelphia Fusion	Burbank, CA

36	June 02	New York Excelsior	2	–	3	Los Angeles Valiant	Burbank, CA

37	June 07	Los Angeles Gladiators	3	–	2	New York Excelsior	Burbank, CA

38	June 09	New York Excelsior	2	–	1	San Francisco Shock	Burbank, CA

39	June 14	New York Excelsior	1	–	3	Boston Uprising	Burbank, CA

40	June 15	Houston Outlaws	2	–	3	New York Excelsior	Burbank, CA

=== Playoffs ===
2018 playoff game log
Stage 1 Playoffs (0–1)

Semifinals	First-round bye

Finals	February 10	London Spitfire	3	–	2	New York Excelsior	Burbank, CA

Stage 2 Playoffs (1–0)

Semifinals	First-round bye

Finals	March 25	Philadelphia Fusion	2	–	3	New York Excelsior	Burbank, CA

Stage 3 Playoffs (2–0)

Semifinals	May 06	Los Angeles Valiant	0	–	3	New York Excelsior	Burbank, CA

Finals	May 06	New York Excelsior	3	–	0	Boston Uprising	Burbank, CA

Stage 4 Playoffs (1–1)

Semifinals	June 17	Dallas Fuel	2	–	3	New York Excelsior	Burbank, CA

Finals	June 17	New York Excelsior	1	–	3	Los Angeles Valiant	Burbank, CA

Season Playoffs (0–2)

Quarterfinals	First-round bye

Semifinals Match 1	July 18	Philadelphia Fusion	3	–	0	New York Excelsior	Burbank, CA

Semifinals Match 2	July 21	Philadelphia Fusion	3	–	2	New York Excelsior	Burbank, CA
