= 2018 Florida Mayhem season =

- Head coach: Vytis "Mineral" Lasaitis
- Owner: Ben Spoont
- Division: Atlantic

Results
- Record: 7–33 (.175)
- Place: Atlantic: 6th; League: 11th
- Stage 1 Playoffs: Did not qualify
- Stage 2 Playoffs: Did not qualify
- Stage 3 Playoffs: Did not qualify
- Stage 4 Playoffs: Did not qualify
- Season Playoffs: Did not qualify
- Total Earnings: $25,000

The 2018 Florida Mayhem season was the first season of the Florida Mayhem's existence in the Overwatch League. The team ended the 2018 regular season with a 7–33 record, second-to-last in the League, and did not qualify for any stage playoffs or the season playoffs.

== Preceding offseason ==
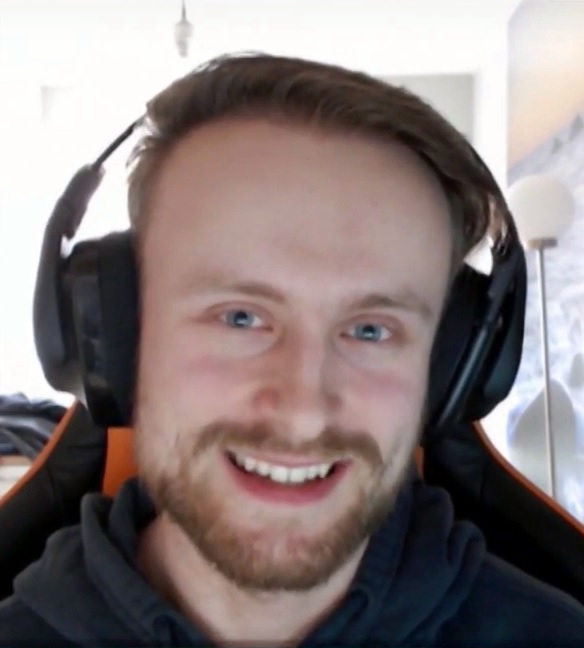
Head coach Vytis "Mineral" Lasaitis

On November 2, 2017, the Overwatch League announced that Misfits Gaming has purchased the Florida franchise slot for the league and would be branded as the Florida Mayhem. The team would be led by head coach Vytis "Mineral" Lasaitis, and all six of their players came from Misfits:

- Kevin "TviQ" Lindström
- Andreas "Logix" Berghmans
- Aleksi "Zuppeh" Kuntsi
- Sebastian "Zebbosai" Olsson
- Johan "CWoosH" Klingestedt
- Tim "Manneten" Bylund

== Regular season ==
On January 11, 2018, the Mayhem played their first Overwatch League match, a 1–3 loss to the London Spitfire. The following week, on January 19, they notched their first-ever victory, after defeating the Shanghai Dragons, 4–0. Looking to increase their roster size, as they only fielded the six-player league minimum at the time, the Mayhem signed tank player Joonas "zappis" Alakurtti on February 1. After finishing Stage 1 with a dismal 1–9 record, Florida picked up Ha "Sayaplayer" Jung-woo and Kim "aWesomeGuy" Sung, two South Korean players from team Meta Athena. The Mayhem had a slightly better record in Stage 2, largely due to the damage duo of Logix and Sayaplayer, going 3–7. However, the upward trend did not continue, as Florida would win only three more matches the entire season, which only included wins over the winless Shanghai Dragons and third-to-last place Dallas Fuel. Additionally, on May 2, just before the end of Stage 3, head coach Mineral temporarily stepped down from his position, citing that he had been experiencing "various health issues" and burnout since Stage 2. Assistant coach Choi "r2der" Hyun-jin and analyst Albert Yeh lead the team in his absence, until his return at the beginning of Stage 4. The team ended the 2018 regular season with a 7–33 record, second-to-last in the League — only ahead of only the winless Dragons. At the end of the season, Sayaplayer was named a reserve for the 2018 All-Star Game.

== Final roster ==
2018 Florida Mayhem roster
Players
Coaches

Role	No.	Handle	Name	Nationality
Damage	2	TviQ	Lindström, Kevin	Sweden
Damage	4	Sayaplayer	Ha Jeong-woo	South Korea
Damage	22	Logix	Berghmans, Andreas	Belgium
Tank	13	aWesomeGuy	Kim, Sung-Hoon	South Korea
Support	7	Zuppeh	Kuntsi, Aleksi	Finland
Support	56	Zebbosai	Olsson, Sebastian	Sweden
Flex	3	CWoosH	Klingestedt, Johan	Sweden
Flex	9	Manneten	Bylund, Tim	Sweden
Flex	19	zappis	Alakurtti, Joonas	Finland

Head coach

- Vytis Lasaitis

Legend:
- (I) Inactive
- (S) Suspended
- (2W) Two-way player
- Substitute
- (injured) Injury / Illness

Latest roster transaction: February 13, 2018.

=== Transactions ===
Transactions of/for players on the roster during the 2018 regular season:

- On February 1, Mayhem signed Joonas "zappis" Alakurtti.
- On February 13, Mayhem signed Ha "Sayaplayer" Jeong-Woo and Kim "aWesomeGuy" Sung-Hoon.

== Standings ==
=== Record by stage ===
Stage	Pld	W	L	Pct	MW	ML	MT	MD	Pos
1	10	1	9	.100	9	31	1	-22	11
2	10	3	7	.300	15	27	1	-12	10
3	10	2	8	.200	11	28	2	-17	10
4	10	1	9	.100	7	34	1	-27	11
Overall	40	7	33	.175	42	120	5	-78	11
Qualified for playoffs

=== League ===
Pos	Div	Team	Pld	W	L	PCT	MW	ML	MT	MD	Qualification
1	ATL	New York Excelsior	40	34	6	0.850	126	43	4	+83	Advance to season playoffs semifinals
2	PAC	Los Angeles Valiant	40	27	13	0.675	100	64	7	+36	Advance to season playoffs semifinals
3	ATL	Boston Uprising	40	26	14	0.650	99	71	3	+28	Advance to season playoffs quarterfinals
4	PAC	Los Angeles Gladiators	40	25	15	0.625	96	72	3	+24	Advance to season playoffs quarterfinals
5	ATL	London Spitfire	40	24	16	0.600	102	69	3	+33	Advance to season playoffs quarterfinals
6	ATL	Philadelphia Fusion	40	24	16	0.600	93	80	2	+13	Advance to season playoffs quarterfinals
7	ATL	Houston Outlaws	40	22	18	0.550	94	77	2	+17	
8	PAC	Seoul Dynasty	40	22	18	0.550	91	78	3	+13	
9	PAC	San Francisco Shock	40	17	23	0.425	77	84	5	−7	
10	PAC	Dallas Fuel	40	12	28	0.300	58	100	7	−42	
11	ATL	Florida Mayhem	40	7	33	0.175	42	120	5	−78	
12	PAC	Shanghai Dragons	40	0	40	0.000	21	141	2	−120	

Source: The Overwatch League
Rules for classification: 1) winning percentage; 2) map differential; 3) head-to-head map differential; 4) head-to-head record

== Game log ==
=== Preseason ===
2018 preseason game log
Preseason (0–2)

1	December 6	Florida Mayhem	1	–	3	San Francisco Shock	Burbank, CA

2	December 9	Florida Mayhem	1	–	3	Dallas Fuel	Burbank, CA

=== Regular season ===
2018 game log (Regular season record: 7–33)
Stage 1 (1–9)

1	January 11	London Spitfire	3	–	1	Florida Mayhem	Burbank, CA

2	January 12	Florida Mayhem	0	–	4	Boston Uprising	Burbank, CA

3	January 17	Florida Mayhem	0	–	4	Seoul Dynasty	Burbank, CA

4	January 19	Shanghai Dragons	0	–	4	Florida Mayhem	Burbank, CA

5	January 25	Houston Outlaws	4	–	0	Florida Mayhem	Burbank, CA

6	January 27	Los Angeles Valiant	3	–	1	Florida Mayhem	Burbank, CA

7	January 31	Florida Mayhem	1	–	3	Los Angeles Gladiators	Burbank, CA

8	February 02	San Francisco Shock	4	–	0	Florida Mayhem	Burbank, CA

9	February 08	Florida Mayhem	0	–	4	New York Excelsior	Burbank, CA

10	February 10	Florida Mayhem	2	–	3	Philadelphia Fusion	Burbank, CA

Stage 2 (3–7)

11	February 22	New York Excelsior	3	–	1	Florida Mayhem	Burbank, CA

12	February 24	Philadelphia Fusion	4	–	0	Florida Mayhem	Burbank, CA

13	March 01	Florida Mayhem	1	–	3	London Spitfire	Burbank, CA

14	March 02	Boston Uprising	4	–	0	Florida Mayhem	Burbank, CA

15	March 09	Florida Mayhem	2	–	3	Houston Outlaws	Burbank, CA

16	March 10	Florida Mayhem	3	–	2	Dallas Fuel	Burbank, CA

17	March 15	Florida Mayhem	3	–	1	Los Angeles Valiant	Burbank, CA

18	March 16	Los Angeles Gladiators	2	–	1	Florida Mayhem	Burbank, CA

19	March 21	Florida Mayhem	3	–	2	San Francisco Shock	Burbank, CA

20	March 23	Seoul Dynasty	3	–	1	Florida Mayhem	Burbank, CA

Stage 3 (2–8)

21	April 05	Florida Mayhem	0	–	4	New York Excelsior	Burbank, CA

22	April 07	Florida Mayhem	1	–	3	Philadelphia Fusion	Burbank, CA

23	April 12	London Spitfire	3	–	0	Florida Mayhem	Burbank, CA

24	April 14	Florida Mayhem	2	–	3	Boston Uprising	Burbank, CA

25	April 19	Houston Outlaws	3	–	1	Florida Mayhem	Burbank, CA

26	April 20	Florida Mayhem	3	–	1	Shanghai Dragons	Burbank, CA

27	April 25	Dallas Fuel	1	–	3	Florida Mayhem	Burbank, CA

28	April 27	Los Angeles Valiant	3	–	1	Florida Mayhem	Burbank, CA

29	May 02	Florida Mayhem	0	–	3	Los Angeles Gladiators	Burbank, CA

30	May 03	San Francisco Shock	4	–	0	Florida Mayhem	Burbank, CA

Stage 4 (1–9)

31	May 17	New York Excelsior	3	–	0	Florida Mayhem	Burbank, CA

32	May 19	Philadelphia Fusion	4	–	0	Florida Mayhem	Burbank, CA

33	May 23	Florida Mayhem	1	–	3	Los Angeles Valiant	Burbank, CA

34	May 24	Los Angeles Gladiators	4	–	0	Florida Mayhem	Burbank, CA

35	June 01	Florida Mayhem	2	–	3	Seoul Dynasty	Burbank, CA

36	June 02	Florida Mayhem	1	–	3	Houston Outlaws	Burbank, CA

37	June 06	Shanghai Dragons	2	–	3	Florida Mayhem	Burbank, CA

38	June 08	Florida Mayhem	0	–	4	Dallas Fuel	Burbank, CA

39	June 14	Florida Mayhem	0	–	4	London Spitfire	Burbank, CA

40	June 16	Boston Uprising	4	–	0	Florida Mayhem	Burbank, CA
