= 2018 Los Angeles Gladiators season =

- Head coach: David Pei
- Owner: Kroenke Sports & Entertainment
- Division: Pacific

Results
- Record: 25–15 (.625)
- Place: Pacific: 2nd; League: 4th
- Stage 1 Playoffs: Did not qualify
- Stage 2 Playoffs: Did not qualify
- Stage 3 Playoffs: Semifinals
- Stage 4 Playoffs: Semifinals
- Season Playoffs: Quarterfinals
- Total Earnings: $200,000

The 2018 Los Angeles Gladiators was the first season of the Los Angeles Gladiators's existence in the Overwatch League. The team finished with a regular season record of 25–15 – the fourth best in the Overwatch League.

Los Angeles qualified for the Stage 3 and Stage 4 Playoffs. The team lost in the Stage 3 semifinals to the Boston Uprising. In the Stage 4 semifinals, the Gladiators lost to the Los Angeles Valiant. The team also qualified for the Season Playoffs, but lost to the London Spitfire in the quarterfinals.

== Preceding offseason ==
On November 2, Gladiators unveiled their initial 7-player inaugural season roster, consisting of the following players:

- Lane "Surefour" Roberts
- João Pedro "Hydration" Goes Telles
- Kim "Bischu" Hyung-seok
- Jonas "Shaz" Suovaara
- Benjamin "BigGoose" Isohanni
- Choi "Asher" Jun-sung
- Luis "iRemiix" Galarza Figueroa

The team revealed that the players were picked from a conglomeration of professional Overwatch esports teams to suit an "aggressive and fun" playstyle the team hoped to emulate as a reflection of their personality.

== Review ==
=== Regular season ===
Their debut match was a 4–0 victory over the Shanghai Dragons. They finished Stage 1 with a 4–6 record in 8th place.

Heading into Stage 2, the team announced the transfer of tank player Baek "Fissure" Chan-hyung from the London Spitfire. Following the acquisition of Fissure, the team finished the stage in fifth place with a 6–4 record, including a 4–0 sweep over the Valiant.

Between Stages 2 and 3, the Gladiators acquired Ted "silkthread" Wang from the Valiant and Kang "Void" Jun-woo from Kongdoo Panthera. However, visa issues would cause Void to completely miss out on Stage 3. The Gladiators finished Stage 3 with a 6–4 record in fourth place, which, beginning with the third stage, was the final stage playoff spot. The top-seeded Boston Uprising, undefeated in Stage 3, selected the Gladiators as their first round opponent. On May 6, the Uprising swept the Gladiators 3–0.

The Gladiators, now regularly using Void in their lineup following his visa being approved, finished with a league-best 9–1 record in Stage 4, including a reverse sweep over back-to-back stage champions New York Excelsior. However, the team would unexpectedly choose the second-seeded Valiant as their semi-final opposition. The Valiant would subsequently defeat the Gladiators in the Stage Playoffs by a score of 3–2. They would end the season with a 25–15 record, good for 4th place and a spot in the postseason where they would face against the London Spitfire.

=== Season playoffs ===
On July 11, the first day of the season's playoffs, the fourth-seeded Gladiators took a 1–0 series lead after defeating the fifth-seeded Spitfire 3–0 in their first ever playoffs match. The Gladiators made headlines by surprisingly announcing on the day of the first match that main tank Fissure would be benched in favor of Luis "iRemiix" Galarza Figueroa. Later on the same day, Fissure was revealed by Blizzard as the runner-up in the inaugural Overwatch League season MVP vote. Two days later, the Gladiators would be eliminated from the playoffs after the Spitfire shut out the Gladiators in back-to-back matches to win the series 2–1.

== Final roster ==
2018 Los Angeles Gladiators roster
Players
Coaches

Role	No.	Handle	Name	Nationality
Damage	1	Asher	Choi Jun-sung	South Korea
Damage	4	Surefour	Roberts, Lane	Canada
Damage	9	silkthread	Wang, Ted	United States
Damage	99	Hydration	Goes Telles, João Pedro	Brazil
Tank	22	Fissure	Baek Chan-hyung	South Korea
Tank	24	iRemiix	Galarza Figueroa, Luis	Puerto Rico
Support	0	BigGoose	Isohanni, Benjamin	Finland
Support	10	Shaz	Suovaara, Jonas	Finland
Flex	31	Bischu	Kim Hyung-seok	South Korea
Flex	57	Void	Kang Jun-woo	South Korea

Head coach

- David Pei

Legend:
- (I) Inactive
- (S) Suspended
- (2W) Two-way player
- Substitute
- (injured) Injury / Illness

Latest roster transaction: April 3, 2018.

=== Transactions ===
Transactions of/for players on the roster during the 2018 regular season:

- On February 13, Gladiators acquired Baek "Fissure" Chan-hyung from London Spitfire.
- On March 25, Gladiators signed Kang "Void" Jun-woo.
- On April 3, Gladiators acquired Ted "silkthread" Wang from Los Angeles Valiant.

== Standings ==
=== Record by stage ===
Stage	Pld	W	L	Pct	MW	ML	MT	MD	Pos
1	10	4	6	.400	16	26	0	-10	8
2	10	6	4	.600	25	16	1	+9	5
3	10	6	4	.600	25	19	1	+6	4
4	10	9	1	.900	30	11	1	+19	1
Overall	40	25	15	.625	96	72	3	+24	4
Qualified for playoffs

=== League ===
Pos	Div	Team	Pld	W	L	PCT	MW	ML	MT	MD	Qualification
1	ATL	New York Excelsior	40	34	6	0.850	126	43	4	+83	Advance to season playoffs semifinals
2	PAC	Los Angeles Valiant	40	27	13	0.675	100	64	7	+36	Advance to season playoffs semifinals
3	ATL	Boston Uprising	40	26	14	0.650	99	71	3	+28	Advance to season playoffs quarterfinals
4	PAC	Los Angeles Gladiators	40	25	15	0.625	96	72	3	+24	Advance to season playoffs quarterfinals
5	ATL	London Spitfire	40	24	16	0.600	102	69	3	+33	Advance to season playoffs quarterfinals
6	ATL	Philadelphia Fusion	40	24	16	0.600	93	80	2	+13	Advance to season playoffs quarterfinals
7	ATL	Houston Outlaws	40	22	18	0.550	94	77	2	+17	
8	PAC	Seoul Dynasty	40	22	18	0.550	91	78	3	+13	
9	PAC	San Francisco Shock	40	17	23	0.425	77	84	5	−7	
10	PAC	Dallas Fuel	40	12	28	0.300	58	100	7	−42	
11	ATL	Florida Mayhem	40	7	33	0.175	42	120	5	−78	
12	PAC	Shanghai Dragons	40	0	40	0.000	21	141	2	−120	

Source: The Overwatch League
Rules for classification: 1) winning percentage; 2) map differential; 3) head-to-head map differential; 4) head-to-head record

== Game log ==
=== Preseason ===
2018 preseason game log
Preseason (1–1)

1	December 7	Los Angeles Gladiators	3	–	2	London Spitfire	Burbank, CA

2	December 9	Los Angeles Valiant	3	–	1	Los Angeles Gladiators	Burbank, CA

=== Regular season ===
2018 game log (Regular season record: 25–15)
Stage 1 (4–6)

1	January 10	Shanghai Dragons	0	–	4	Los Angeles Gladiators	Burbank, CA

2	January 13	Seoul Dynasty	4	–	0	Los Angeles Gladiators	Burbank, CA

3	January 18	Philadelphia Fusion	2	–	3	Los Angeles Gladiators	Burbank, CA

4	January 20	Los Angeles Gladiators	0	–	4	New York Excelsior	Burbank, CA

5	January 24	Los Angeles Gladiators	2	–	3	Los Angeles Valiant	Burbank, CA

6	January 27	Los Angeles Gladiators	0	–	4	Houston Outlaws	Burbank, CA

7	January 31	Florida Mayhem	1	–	3	Los Angeles Gladiators	Burbank, CA

8	February 02	Los Angeles Gladiators	0	–	4	Boston Uprising	Burbank, CA

9	February 07	San Francisco Shock	1	–	3	Los Angeles Gladiators	Burbank, CA

10	February 09	Los Angeles Gladiators	1	–	3	Dallas Fuel	Burbank, CA

Stage 2 (6–4)

11	February 21	Los Angeles Gladiators	4	–	0	San Francisco Shock	Burbank, CA

12	February 23	Dallas Fuel	3	–	1	Los Angeles Gladiators	Burbank, CA

13	February 28	Los Angeles Gladiators	4	–	0	Shanghai Dragons	Burbank, CA

14	March 02	Los Angeles Gladiators	1	–	3	Seoul Dynasty	Burbank, CA

15	March 07	Los Angeles Valiant	0	–	4	Los Angeles Gladiators	Burbank, CA

16	March 10	London Spitfire	1	–	3	Los Angeles Gladiators	Burbank, CA

17	March 15	Houston Outlaws	2	–	3	Los Angeles Gladiators	Burbank, CA

18	March 16	Los Angeles Gladiators	2	–	1	Florida Mayhem	Burbank, CA

19	March 21	Los Angeles Gladiators	1	–	3	Philadelphia Fusion	Burbank, CA

20	March 24	Boston Uprising	3	–	2	Los Angeles Gladiators	Burbank, CA

Stage 3 (6–4)

21	April 04	San Francisco Shock	3	–	1	Los Angeles Gladiators	Burbank, CA

22	April 06	Los Angeles Gladiators	3	–	1	Dallas Fuel	Burbank, CA

23	April 11	Shanghai Dragons	0	–	4	Los Angeles Gladiators	Burbank, CA

24	April 13	Seoul Dynasty	2	–	3	Los Angeles Gladiators	Burbank, CA

25	April 18	Los Angeles Gladiators	2	–	3	Los Angeles Valiant	Burbank, CA

26	April 21	New York Excelsior	3	–	2	Los Angeles Gladiators	Burbank, CA

27	April 26	Los Angeles Gladiators	3	–	2	London Spitfire	Burbank, CA

28	April 27	Los Angeles Gladiators	3	–	2	Houston Outlaws	Burbank, CA

29	May 02	Florida Mayhem	0	–	3	Los Angeles Gladiators	Burbank, CA

30	May 04	Los Angeles Gladiators	1	–	3	Boston Uprising	Burbank, CA

Stage 4 (9–1)

31	May 16	Los Angeles Gladiators	3	–	1	San Francisco Shock	Burbank, CA

32	May 18	Dallas Fuel	0	–	4	Los Angeles Gladiators	Burbank, CA

33	May 23	Houston Outlaws	1	–	3	Los Angeles Gladiators	Burbank, CA

34	May 24	Los Angeles Gladiators	4	–	0	Florida Mayhem	Burbank, CA

35	May 30	Los Angeles Valiant	3	–	0	Los Angeles Gladiators	Burbank, CA

36	May 31	Philadelphia Fusion	1	–	3	Los Angeles Gladiators	Burbank, CA

37	June 07	Los Angeles Gladiators	3	–	2	New York Excelsior	Burbank, CA

38	June 09	London Spitfire	2	–	3	Los Angeles Gladiators	Burbank, CA

39	June 13	Los Angeles Gladiators	4	–	0	Shanghai Dragons	Burbank, CA

40	June 15	Los Angeles Gladiators	3	–	1	Seoul Dynasty	Burbank, CA

=== Playoffs ===
2018 playoff game log
Stage 3 Playoffs (0–1)

Semifinals	May 06	Los Angeles Gladiators	0	–	3	Boston Uprising	Burbank, CA

Stage 4 Playoffs (0–1)

Semifinals	June 17	Los Angeles Valiant	3	–	2	Los Angeles Gladiators	Burbank, CA

Season Playoffs (1–2)

Quarterfinals Match 1	July 11	London Spitfire	0	–	3	Los Angeles Gladiators	Burbank, CA

Quarterfinals Match 2	July 14	London Spitfire	3	–	0	Los Angeles Gladiators	Burbank, CA

Quarterfinals Match 3	July 14	London Spitfire	3	–	0	Los Angeles Gladiators	Burbank, CA
