= 2018 Shanghai Dragons season =

Season of Overwatch esports team

- Head coach: Chen Congshan (rel. Mar 6); Wang Xingrui (rel. May 9); Son Jun-young
- Owner: NetEase
- Division: Pacific

Results
- Record: 0–40 (.000)
- Place: Pacific: 6th; League: 12th
- Stage 1 Playoffs: Did not qualify
- Stage 2 Playoffs: Did not qualify
- Stage 3 Playoffs: Did not qualify
- Stage 4 Playoffs: Did not qualify
- Season Playoffs: Did not qualify
- Total Earnings: $25,000

The 2018 Shanghai Dragons season was the first season of the Shanghai Dragons's existence in the Overwatch League. Shanghai did not record a single win in the entire 2018 Overwatch League season, giving the team a record of 0–40; this marked the worst single-season record in professional sports history.

== Preceding offseason ==
On October 31, Dragons revealed their Overwatch League roster, consisting of the following eight members:

- Lu "Diya" Weida
- Fang "uNdeAD" Chao
- Jing "Roshan" Wenhao
- Liu "Xushu" Junjie
- Xu "Freefeel" Peixuan
- Chen "Fiveking" Zhaoyu
- Cheng "Altering" Yage
- Wu "MG" Dongjian

Three weeks later, on November 20, Shanghai Dragons announced their coaching staff, including head coach Chen "U4" Congshan.

== Regular season ==
=== Review ===
Shanghai Dragons' first regular season OWL match was a 1–3 loss to the San Francisco Shock. Unfortunately, this result would become a trend for the Dragons for quite some time. The team did not record a win in Stage 1, going 0–10. On February 13, 2018, disappointed by their Stage 1 record, the Dragons signed 4 new players in hopes to improve their Stage 2 chances; most notably including the league's first female player, South Korean Kim "Geguri" Se-yeon.

Amidst a disaster of a season, Shanghai went through three different head coaches. The Dragons finished the season with a 0–40 record and a -120 map differential, having not won a single match. This marked the worst single-season record in professional sports history.

== Final roster ==
2018 Shanghai Dragons roster
Players
Coaches

Role	No.	Handle	Name	Nationality
Damage	10	Daemin	Kim Dae-min	South Korea
Damage	87	Diya	Lu Weida	China
Damage	99	Ado	Chon Gi-hyeon	South Korea
Tank	8	Fearless	Lee Eui-seok	South Korea
Tank	26	Roshan	Jing Wenhao	China
Tank	66	Xushu	Liu Junjie	China
Tank	96	Geguri	Kim Se-yeon	South Korea
Support	7	Freefeel	Xu Peixuan	China
Support	9	Fiveking	Chen Zhaoyu	China
Support	13	Altering	Cheng Yage	China
Support	22	Sky	He Junjian	China

Head coach

- Son Jun-young

Legend:
- (I) Inactive
- (S) Suspended
- (2W) Two-way player
- Substitute
- (injured) Injury / Illness

Latest roster transaction: June 5, 2018.

=== Transactions ===
Transactions of/for players on the roster during the 2018 regular season:

- On February 14, Dragons signed Chon "Ado" Gi-hyeon, Kim "Geguri" Se-yeon, Lee "Fearless" Eui-seok, and He "Sky" Junjuan.
- On March 29, Dragons released Fang "Undead" Chao.
- On April 4, Dragons signed Kim "Daemin" Dae-min.
- On June 5, Dragons released Wu "MG" Dongjian.

== Standings ==
=== Record by stage ===
Stage	Pld	W	L	Pct	MW	ML	MT	MD	Pos
1	10	0	10	.000	6	36	0	-30	12
2	10	0	10	.000	2	37	1	-35	12
3	10	0	10	.000	9	32	0	-23	12
4	10	0	10	.000	4	36	1	-32	12
Overall	40	0	40	.000	21	141	2	-120	12
Qualified for playoffs

=== League ===
Pos	Div	Team	Pld	W	L	PCT	MW	ML	MT	MD	Qualification
1	ATL	New York Excelsior	40	34	6	0.850	126	43	4	+83	Advance to season playoffs semifinals
2	PAC	Los Angeles Valiant	40	27	13	0.675	100	64	7	+36	Advance to season playoffs semifinals
3	ATL	Boston Uprising	40	26	14	0.650	99	71	3	+28	Advance to season playoffs quarterfinals
4	PAC	Los Angeles Gladiators	40	25	15	0.625	96	72	3	+24	Advance to season playoffs quarterfinals
5	ATL	London Spitfire	40	24	16	0.600	102	69	3	+33	Advance to season playoffs quarterfinals
6	ATL	Philadelphia Fusion	40	24	16	0.600	93	80	2	+13	Advance to season playoffs quarterfinals
7	ATL	Houston Outlaws	40	22	18	0.550	94	77	2	+17	
8	PAC	Seoul Dynasty	40	22	18	0.550	91	78	3	+13	
9	PAC	San Francisco Shock	40	17	23	0.425	77	84	5	−7	
10	PAC	Dallas Fuel	40	12	28	0.300	58	100	7	−42	
11	ATL	Florida Mayhem	40	7	33	0.175	42	120	5	−78	
12	PAC	Shanghai Dragons	40	0	40	0.000	21	141	2	−120	

Source: The Overwatch League
Rules for classification: 1) winning percentage; 2) map differential; 3) head-to-head map differential; 4) head-to-head record

== Game log ==
=== Preseason ===
2018 preseason game log
Preseason (0–2)

1	December 6	Seoul Dynasty	4	–	0	Shanghai Dragons	Burbank, CA

2	December 8	Shanghai Dragons	2	–	3	Boston Uprising	Burbank, CA

=== Regular season ===
2018 game log (Regular season record: 0–40)
Stage 1 (0–10)

1	January 10	Shanghai Dragons	0	–	4	Los Angeles Gladiators	Burbank, CA

2	January 12	San Francisco Shock	3	–	1	Shanghai Dragons	Burbank, CA

3	January 17	Houston Outlaws	4	–	0	Shanghai Dragons	Burbank, CA

4	January 19	Shanghai Dragons	0	–	4	Florida Mayhem	Burbank, CA

5	January 24	Shanghai Dragons	1	–	3	Seoul Dynasty	Burbank, CA

6	January 26	Shanghai Dragons	2	–	3	Philadelphia Fusion	Burbank, CA

7	February 01	New York Excelsior	4	–	0	Shanghai Dragons	Burbank, CA

8	February 03	Shanghai Dragons	0	–	4	London Spitfire	Burbank, CA

9	February 07	Shanghai Dragons	2	–	3	Dallas Fuel	Burbank, CA

10	February 09	Los Angeles Valiant	4	–	0	Shanghai Dragons	Burbank, CA

Stage 2 (0–10)

11	February 21	Dallas Fuel	3	–	1	Shanghai Dragons	Burbank, CA

12	February 24	Shanghai Dragons	0	–	3	Los Angeles Valiant	Burbank, CA

13	February 28	Los Angeles Gladiators	4	–	0	Shanghai Dragons	Burbank, CA

14	March 03	Shanghai Dragons	0	–	4	San Francisco Shock	Burbank, CA

15	March 07	Seoul Dynasty	3	–	1	Shanghai Dragons	Burbank, CA

16	March 08	Boston Uprising	4	–	0	Shanghai Dragons	Burbank, CA

17	March 15	Philadelphia Fusion	4	–	0	Shanghai Dragons	Burbank, CA

18	March 15	Shanghai Dragons	0	–	4	New York Excelsior	Burbank, CA

19	March 22	Shanghai Dragons	0	–	4	Houston Outlaws	Burbank, CA

20	March 24	London Spitfire	4	–	0	Shanghai Dragons	Burbank, CA

Stage 3 (0–10)

21	April 04	Shanghai Dragons	1	–	3	Dallas Fuel	Burbank, CA

22	April 06	Los Angeles Valiant	4	–	0	Shanghai Dragons	Burbank, CA

23	April 11	Shanghai Dragons	0	–	4	Los Angeles Gladiators	Burbank, CA

24	April 13	San Francisco Shock	3	–	1	Shanghai Dragons	Burbank, CA

25	April 18	Shanghai Dragons	1	–	3	Seoul Dynasty	Burbank, CA

26	April 20	Florida Mayhem	3	–	1	Shanghai Dragons	Burbank, CA

27	April 25	Shanghai Dragons	1	–	3	Boston Uprising	Burbank, CA

28	April 28	Shanghai Dragons	2	–	3	Philadelphia Fusion	Burbank, CA

29	May 04	New York Excelsior	3	–	1	Shanghai Dragons	Burbank, CA

30	May 05	Shanghai Dragons	1	–	3	London Spitfire	Burbank, CA

Stage 4 (0–10)

31	May 16	Dallas Fuel	3	–	1	Shanghai Dragons	Burbank, CA

32	May 19	Shanghai Dragons	1	–	3	Los Angeles Valiant	Burbank, CA

33	May 24	Philadelphia Fusion	4	–	0	Shanghai Dragons	Burbank, CA

34	May 26	Shanghai Dragons	0	–	4	New York Excelsior	Burbank, CA

35	May 30	Seoul Dynasty	4	–	0	Shanghai Dragons	Burbank, CA

36	June 01	Houston Outlaws	3	–	0	Shanghai Dragons	Burbank, CA

37	June 06	Shanghai Dragons	2	–	3	Florida Mayhem	Burbank, CA

38	June 08	Boston Uprising	4	–	0	Shanghai Dragons	Burbank, CA

39	June 13	Los Angeles Gladiators	4	–	0	Shanghai Dragons	Burbank, CA

40	June 16	Shanghai Dragons	0	–	4	San Francisco Shock	Burbank, CA
