= 2018 Boston Uprising season =

- Head coach: Park "Crusty" Dae-hee (Released May 7)
- Owner: Robert Kraft
- Division: Atlantic

Results
- Record: 26–14 (.650)
- Place: Atlantic: 2nd; League: 3rd
- Stage 1 Playoffs: Did not qualify
- Stage 2 Playoffs: Did not qualify
- Stage 3 Playoffs: Finals
- Stage 4 Playoffs: Did not qualify
- Season Playoffs: Quarterfinals
- Total Earnings: $225,000

The 2018 Boston Uprising season was the first season of Boston Uprising's existence in the Overwatch League. In Stage 3, Boston became the first team to go undefeated in a stage, posting a perfect 10–0 record; however, the team lost in the Stage 3 semifinals to New York Excelsior. The team finished with a regular season record of 26–14 — the third best of all teams in the 2018 Overwatch League season. Boston lost to Philadelphia Fusion in the quarterfinals of the season playoffs.

== Preceding offseason ==
On October 26, 2017, Boston Uprising announced their initial inaugural season roster, consisting of the following players:

- Lucas "NotE" Meissner
- Kristian "Kellex" Keller
- Noh "Gamsu" Young-jin
- Kwon "Striker" Nam-joo
- Stanislav "Mistakes" Danilov
- Shin "Kalios" Woo-yeol
- Mikias "Snow" Yohannes
- Jonathan "DreamKazper" Sanchez

The team went on to sign Park "Neko" Se-hyeon and Connor "Avast" Prince on November 7.

== Regular season ==
Boston Uprising's first-ever regular season OWL match was a 1–3 loss to the New York Excelsior on January 11, 2018. Boston found their franchise's first-ever regular season win a day later, after defeating the Florida Mayhem, 4–0. The Uprising needed a win over the Houston Outlaws in their final regular season match of Stage 1 to qualify for the Stage 1 playoffs; however, they lost the match, 2–3, and did not make the playoffs.

Through the first half of the season, Boston had a 12–8 record. On April 3, prior to the start of Stage 3, Boston picked up support player Kwon "AimGod" Min-seok, although he would not be able to play until Stage 4, once his visa process had completed. A few days later, Uprising player Jonathan "DreamKazper" Sanchez was indefinitely suspended from the Overwatch League following allegations of sexual misconduct involving a minor. Shortly after, on April 9, Boston Uprising terminated his contract. Following, Kwon "Striker" Nam-joo took over DreamKazper's starting position – a move that ultimately benefited the team. Throughout Stage 3 of the season, the Striker-led Uprising did not lose a single match, going 10–0, to become the first team to go undefeated in a stage. Boston reached the Stage 3 finals; however, they lost the finals match against the New York Excelsior. The team advanced to the Stage 3 playoff finals, but they lost to the New York Excelsior.

Prior to the start of Stage 4, Overwatch underwent a balancing update, as well as the introduction of a new hero, which would significantly reduced Striker's effectiveness. Additionally, head coach Park "Crusty" Dae-hee left the team to join the San Francisco Shock. The team went 0–6 through the first six matches of Stage 4. The Uprising finished the regular season in third place with a 26–14 record.

== Postseason ==
As the third seed in the season playoffs, Boston faced the Philadelphia Fusion in the quarterfinals in a best-of-three series. The Fusion won the first match, 3–1 on July 11, closing it out by defeating Boston on the map Volskaya Industries — a map that Boston had never lost on before. Boston evened the series the following day with a 3–1 win, but their season ended on July 13, after the Fusion took the final match, 3–1.

== Final roster ==
2018 Boston Uprising roster
Players
Coaches

Role	No.	Handle	Name	Nationality
Damage	2	Mistakes	Danilov, Stanislav	Russia
Damage	7	Striker	Kwon Nam-joo	South Korea
Tank	1	Gamsu	Noh Young-jin	South Korea
Tank	3	NotE	Meissner, Lucas	Canada
Tank	18	Kalios	Shin Woo-yeol	South Korea
Support	8	Neko	Park Se-hyeon	South Korea
Support	9	Kellex	Keller, Kristian	Denmark
Support	10	Snow	Yohannes, Mikias	Ethiopia
Support	18	Avast	Prince, Connor	United States
Support	31	AimGod	Kwon Min-Seok	South Korea

Head coach

- Vacant

Legend:
- (I) Inactive
- (S) Suspended
- (2W) Two-way player
- Substitute
- (injured) Injury / Illness

Latest roster transaction: April 9, 2018.

=== Transactions ===
Transactions of/for players on the roster during the 2018 regular season:

- On April 3, Uprising signed Minseok "AimGod" Kwon.
- On April 9, Uprising released Jonathan "DreamKazper" Sanchez.

== Standings ==
=== Record by stage ===
Stage	Pld	W	L	Pct	MW	ML	MT	MD	Pos
1	10	6	4	.600	27	17	0	+10	6
2	10	6	4	.600	21	22	0	-1	6
3	10	10	0	1.000	31	13	1	+18	1
4	10	4	6	.400	20	19	2	+1	8
Overall	40	26	14	.650	99	71	3	+28	3
Qualified for playoffs

=== League ===
Pos	Div	Team	Pld	W	L	PCT	MW	ML	MT	MD	Qualification
1	ATL	New York Excelsior	40	34	6	0.850	126	43	4	+83	Advance to season playoffs semifinals
2	PAC	Los Angeles Valiant	40	27	13	0.675	100	64	7	+36	Advance to season playoffs semifinals
3	ATL	Boston Uprising	40	26	14	0.650	99	71	3	+28	Advance to season playoffs quarterfinals
4	PAC	Los Angeles Gladiators	40	25	15	0.625	96	72	3	+24	Advance to season playoffs quarterfinals
5	ATL	London Spitfire	40	24	16	0.600	102	69	3	+33	Advance to season playoffs quarterfinals
6	ATL	Philadelphia Fusion	40	24	16	0.600	93	80	2	+13	Advance to season playoffs quarterfinals
7	ATL	Houston Outlaws	40	22	18	0.550	94	77	2	+17	
8	PAC	Seoul Dynasty	40	22	18	0.550	91	78	3	+13	
9	PAC	San Francisco Shock	40	17	23	0.425	77	84	5	−7	
10	PAC	Dallas Fuel	40	12	28	0.300	58	100	7	−42	
11	ATL	Florida Mayhem	40	7	33	0.175	42	120	5	−78	
12	PAC	Shanghai Dragons	40	0	40	0.000	21	141	2	−120	

Source: The Overwatch League
Rules for classification: 1) winning percentage; 2) map differential; 3) head-to-head map differential; 4) head-to-head record

== Game log ==
=== Preseason ===
2018 preseason game log
Preseason (1–1)

1	December 07	New York Excelsior	3	–	1	Boston Uprising	Burbank, CA

2	December 08	Shanghai Dragons	2	–	3	Boston Uprising	Burbank, CA

=== Regular season ===
2018 game log (Regular season record: 26–14)
Stage 1 (6–4)

1	January 11	Boston Uprising	1	–	3	New York Excelsior	Burbank, CA

2	January 12	Florida Mayhem	0	–	4	Boston Uprising	Burbank, CA

3	January 19	Seoul Dynasty	4	–	0	Boston Uprising	Burbank, CA

4	January 20	Boston Uprising	2	–	3	San Francisco Shock	Burbank, CA

5	January 25	Boston Uprising	3	–	2	London Spitfire	Burbank, CA

6	January 27	Dallas Fuel	2	–	3	Boston Uprising	Burbank, CA

7	February 02	Los Angeles Gladiators	0	–	4	Boston Uprising	Burbank, CA

8	February 03	Boston Uprising	4	–	0	Los Angeles Valiant	Burbank, CA

9	February 08	Philadelphia Fusion	0	–	4	Boston Uprising	Burbank, CA

10	February 10	Houston Outlaws	3	–	2	Boston Uprising	Burbank, CA

Stage 2 (6–4)

11	February 22	Boston Uprising	0	–	4	Philadelphia Fusion	Burbank, CA

12	February 24	Boston Uprising	0	–	4	Houston Outlaws	Burbank, CA

13	March 01	New York Excelsior	4	–	0	Boston Uprising	Burbank, CA

14	March 02	Boston Uprising	4	–	0	Florida Mayhem	Burbank, CA

15	March 08	Boston Uprising	4	–	0	Shanghai Dragons	Burbank, CA

16	March 09	London Spitfire	4	–	0	Boston Uprising	Burbank, CA

17	March 14	Boston Uprising	4	–	0	Dallas Fuel	Burbank, CA

18	March 16	Los Angeles Valiant	2	–	3	Boston Uprising	Burbank, CA

19	March 22	San Francisco Shock	2	–	3	Boston Uprising	Burbank, CA

20	March 24	Boston Uprising	3	–	2	Los Angeles Gladiators	Burbank, CA

Stage 3 (10–0)

21	April 05	Philadelphia Fusion	2	–	3	Boston Uprising	Burbank, CA

22	April 07	Houston Outlaws	0	–	4	Boston Uprising	Burbank, CA

23	April 12	Boston Uprising	3	–	2	New York Excelsior	Burbank, CA

24	April 14	Florida Mayhem	2	–	3	Boston Uprising	Burbank, CA

25	April 19	Boston Uprising	3	–	2	London Spitfire	Burbank, CA

26	April 20	Boston Uprising	2	–	1	Seoul Dynasty	Burbank, CA

27	April 25	Shanghai Dragons	1	–	3	Boston Uprising	Burbank, CA

28	April 27	Dallas Fuel	0	–	4	Boston Uprising	Burbank, CA

29	May 03	Boston Uprising	3	–	2	Los Angeles Valiant	Burbank, CA

30	May 04	Los Angeles Gladiators	1	–	3	Boston Uprising	Burbank, CA

Semifinals	May 06	Los Angeles Gladiators	0	–	3	Boston Uprising	Burbank, CA

Finals	May 06	New York Excelsior	3	–	0	Boston Uprising	Burbank, CA

Stage 4 (4–6)

31	May 17	Boston Uprising	1	–	3	Philadelphia Fusion	Burbank, CA

32	May 18	Boston Uprising	1	–	3	Houston Outlaws	Burbank, CA

33	May 23	Boston Uprising	0	–	3	Dallas Fuel	Burbank, CA

34	May 25	Los Angeles Valiant	3	–	2	Boston Uprising	Burbank, CA

35	May 31	London Spitfire	2	–	1	Boston Uprising	Burbank, CA

36	June 01	Boston Uprising	1	–	3	San Francisco Shock	Burbank, CA

37	June 06	Seoul Dynasty	1	–	3	Boston Uprising	Burbank, CA

38	June 08	Boston Uprising	4	–	0	Shanghai Dragons	Burbank, CA

39	June 14	New York Excelsior	1	–	3	Boston Uprising	Burbank, CA

40	June 16	Boston Uprising	4	–	0	Florida Mayhem	Burbank, CA

=== Postseason ===
2018 playoff game log
Season Playoffs (1–2)

Quarterfinals Match 1	July 11	Philadelphia Fusion	3	–	1	Boston Uprising	Burbank, CA

Quarterfinals Match 2	July 12	Philadelphia Fusion	1	–	3	Boston Uprising	Burbank, CA

Quarterfinals Match 3	July 13	Philadelphia Fusion	3	–	1	Boston Uprising	Burbank, CA
