= 2018 Seoul Dynasty season =

South Korean esports team season

- Head coach: Baek Kwang-jin
- Owner: Kevin Chou
- Division: Pacific

Results
- Record: 22–18 (.550)
- Place: Pacific: 3rd; League: 8th
- Stage 1 Playoffs: Did not qualify
- Stage 2 Playoffs: Did not qualify
- Stage 3 Playoffs: Did not qualify
- Stage 4 Playoffs: Did not qualify
- Season Playoffs: Did not qualify
- Total Earnings: $75,000

The 2018 Seoul Dynasty season was the first season of the Seoul Dynasty's existence in the Overwatch League. The team finished with a regular season record of 22–18, placing them eighth overall, behind the Houston Outlaws due to tiebreakers, who had the same record. Seoul did not qualify for any of the Stage Playoffs and did not qualify for the Season Playoffs.

== Preceding offseason ==
On August 21, 2017, the team announced the acquisition of the players and coaching staff of Korean Overwatch esports team Lunatic-Hai, which consisted of the following players:

- Kim "EscA" In-jae
- Ryu "ryujehong" Je-hong
- Yang "tobi" Jin-mo
- Kim "zunba" Joon-hyeok
- Moon "gido" Gi-do
- Gong "Miro" Jin-hyuk

In September, the team signed an additional coach in veteran Kim "nuGget" Yo-han. In late October, they revealed 3 additional players to their Seoul-based roster, Kim "Fleta" Byung-sun, Byeon "Munchkin" Sang-beom, and Koo "xepheR" Jae-mo. On October 27, the addition of Choi "Wekeed" Seok-woo was broadcast in the Dynasty's roster preview video. The final two members for the inaugural season, Chae "Bunny" Jun-hyeok and Kim "KuKi" Dae-kuk, were revealed by Blizzard in November. Before the season started, Kim "EscA" In-jae retired.

== Review ==
=== Regular season ===
The Dynasty began the first stage of the regular season well, winning their first five games. However, after key losses to New York Excelsior, London Spitfire, and Los Angeles Valiant they fell out of Stage 1 playoff contention and finished the stage in fifth place, sparking discussions about a disappointing start to the season for a team favored to win it. They went on to finish fourth in the second stage as well, once again missing the stage playoffs. After the stage playoffs were expanded to include the team in fourth place, the Dynasty were predicted to be able to clinch a playoff spot thanks to their consistent fourth-place finishes in the prior stages, though their inability to defeat the top placing teams in the league brought up concerns over team management. With a rocky start to the third stage, coverage for the Dynasty shifted towards continued failure, with an article by ESPN's Emily Rand stating "Seoul's dynasty is already starting to crumble."

They once again failed to reach the playoffs in both the third and fourth stages of the regular season, going 5–5 in Stage 3 and 3–7 in Stage 4. Falling further behind the top teams in map differential. After finishing all four stages with worsening map scores, starting the first stage with a map differential of +9 and ending the last stage with a map differential of -6, the Dynasty fell out of season playoffs contention and finished the season in eighth place overall with a record of 22–18, a far cry from the expected and predicted success.

In response to their inability to clinch a playoff spot, the team underwent large coaching and staffing changes in July.

== Final roster ==
2018 Seoul Dynasty roster
Players
Coaches

Role	No.	Handle	Name	Nationality
Damage	0	Wekeed	Choi Seok-woo	South Korea
Damage	1	Fleta	Kim Byung-sun	South Korea
Damage	27	Munchkin	Byeon Sang-beom	South Korea
Tank	3	Miro	Gong Jin-hyuk	South Korea
Tank	11	KuKi	Kim Dae-kuk	South Korea
Support	7	tobi	Yang Jin-mo	South Korea
Support	9	Gambler	Heo Jin-woo	South Korea
Flex	5	zunba	Kim Joon-hyuk	South Korea
Flex	13	Gido	Moon Gi-do	South Korea
Flex	14	ryujehong	Ryu Je-hong	South Korea
Flex	39	xepheR	Koo Jae-mo	South Korea

Head coach

- Baek Kwang-jin

Legend:
- (I) Inactive
- (S) Suspended
- (2W) Two-way player
- Substitute
- (injured) Injury / Illness

Latest roster transaction: March 30, 2018.

=== Transactions ===
Transactions of/for players on the roster during the 2018 regular season:

- On February 26, Dynasty signed Heo "Gambler" Jin-woo.
- On March 30, Dynasty transferred Chae "Bunny" Jun-hyeok to Los Angeles Valiant.

== Standings ==
=== Record by stage ===
Stage	Pld	W	L	Pct	MW	ML	MT	MD	Pos
1	10	7	3	.700	25	16	2	+9	5
2	10	7	3	.700	25	16	0	+9	4
3	10	5	5	.500	22	21	1	+1	8
4	10	3	7	.300	19	25	0	-6	10
Overall	40	22	18	.550	91	78	3	+13	8
Qualified for playoffs

=== League ===
Pos	Div	Team	Pld	W	L	PCT	MW	ML	MT	MD	Qualification
1	ATL	New York Excelsior	40	34	6	0.850	126	43	4	+83	Advance to season playoffs semifinals
2	PAC	Los Angeles Valiant	40	27	13	0.675	100	64	7	+36	Advance to season playoffs semifinals
3	ATL	Boston Uprising	40	26	14	0.650	99	71	3	+28	Advance to season playoffs quarterfinals
4	PAC	Los Angeles Gladiators	40	25	15	0.625	96	72	3	+24	Advance to season playoffs quarterfinals
5	ATL	London Spitfire	40	24	16	0.600	102	69	3	+33	Advance to season playoffs quarterfinals
6	ATL	Philadelphia Fusion	40	24	16	0.600	93	80	2	+13	Advance to season playoffs quarterfinals
7	ATL	Houston Outlaws	40	22	18	0.550	94	77	2	+17	
8	PAC	Seoul Dynasty	40	22	18	0.550	91	78	3	+13	
9	PAC	San Francisco Shock	40	17	23	0.425	77	84	5	−7	
10	PAC	Dallas Fuel	40	12	28	0.300	58	100	7	−42	
11	ATL	Florida Mayhem	40	7	33	0.175	42	120	5	−78	
12	PAC	Shanghai Dragons	40	0	40	0.000	21	141	2	−120	

Source: The Overwatch League
Rules for classification: 1) winning percentage; 2) map differential; 3) head-to-head map differential; 4) head-to-head record

== Game log ==
=== Preseason ===
2018 preseason game log
Preseason (3–0)

1	December 6	Seoul Dynasty	4	–	0	Shanghai Dragons	Burbank, CA

2	December 8	Seoul Dynasty	2	–	1	Houston Outlaws	Burbank, CA

3	December 9	Seoul Dynasty	3	–	1	New York Excelsior	Burbank, CA

=== Regular season ===
2018 game log (Regular season record: 22–18)
Stage 1 (7–3)

1	January 10	Dallas Fuel	1	–	2	Seoul Dynasty	Burbank, CA

2	January 13	Seoul Dynasty	4	–	0	Los Angeles Gladiators	Burbank, CA

3	January 17	Florida Mayhem	0	–	4	Seoul Dynasty	Burbank, CA

4	January 19	Seoul Dynasty	4	–	0	Boston Uprising	Burbank, CA

5	January 24	Shanghai Dragons	1	–	3	Seoul Dynasty	Burbank, CA

6	January 26	Seoul Dynasty	2	–	3	New York Excelsior	Burbank, CA

7	February 01	London Spitfire	4	–	0	Seoul Dynasty	Burbank, CA

8	February 02	Seoul Dynasty	3	–	2	Houston Outlaws	Burbank, CA

9	February 07	Los Angeles Valiant	3	–	0	Seoul Dynasty	Burbank, CA

10	February 09	Seoul Dynasty	3	–	2	San Francisco Shock	Burbank, CA

Stage 2 (7–3)

11	February 21	Seoul Dynasty	4	–	0	Los Angeles Valiant	Burbank, CA

12	February 23	San Francisco Shock	1	–	3	Seoul Dynasty	Burbank, CA

13	February 28	Seoul Dynasty	3	–	1	Dallas Fuel	Burbank, CA

14	March 02	Los Angeles Gladiators	1	–	3	Seoul Dynasty	Burbank, CA

15	March 07	Seoul Dynasty	3	–	1	Shanghai Dragons	Burbank, CA

16	March 08	Philadelphia Fusion	1	–	3	Seoul Dynasty	Burbank, CA

17	March 14	New York Excelsior	3	–	2	Seoul Dynasty	Burbank, CA

18	March 17	Seoul Dynasty	0	–	4	London Spitfire	Burbank, CA

19	March 22	Houston Outlaws	3	–	1	Seoul Dynasty	Burbank, CA

20	March 23	Seoul Dynasty	3	–	1	Florida Mayhem	Burbank, CA

Stage 3 (5–5)

21	April 04	Los Angeles Valiant	4	–	0	Seoul Dynasty	Burbank, CA

22	April 06	Seoul Dynasty	4	–	0	San Francisco Shock	Burbank, CA

23	April 11	Dallas Fuel	2	–	3	Seoul Dynasty	Burbank, CA

24	April 13	Seoul Dynasty	2	–	3	Los Angeles Gladiators	Burbank, CA

25	April 18	Shanghai Dragons	1	–	3	Seoul Dynasty	Burbank, CA

26	April 20	Boston Uprising	2	–	1	Seoul Dynasty	Burbank, CA

27	April 26	Seoul Dynasty	3	–	2	Philadelphia Fusion	Burbank, CA

28	April 28	Seoul Dynasty	0	–	4	New York Excelsior	Burbank, CA

29	May 04	London Spitfire	3	–	2	Seoul Dynasty	Burbank, CA

30	May 05	Seoul Dynasty	4	–	0	Houston Outlaws	Burbank, CA

Stage 4 (3–7)

31	May 16	Seoul Dynasty	2	–	3	Los Angeles Valiant	Burbank, CA

32	May 18	San Francisco Shock	3	–	1	Seoul Dynasty	Burbank, CA

33	May 25	New York Excelsior	4	–	0	Seoul Dynasty	Burbank, CA

34	May 26	Seoul Dynasty	2	–	3	London Spitfire	Burbank, CA

35	May 30	Seoul Dynasty	4	–	0	Shanghai Dragons	Burbank, CA

36	June 01	Florida Mayhem	2	–	3	Seoul Dynasty	Burbank, CA

37	June 06	Seoul Dynasty	1	–	3	Boston Uprising	Burbank, CA

38	June 08	Philadelphia Fusion	3	–	2	Seoul Dynasty	Burbank, CA

39	June 13	Seoul Dynasty	3	–	1	Dallas Fuel	Burbank, CA

40	June 15	Los Angeles Gladiators	3	–	1	Seoul Dynasty	Burbank, CA
