= 2018 Philadelphia Fusion season =

- Head coach: Yann Luu
- Owner: Comcast Spectacor
- Division: Atlantic

Results
- Record: 24–16 (.600)
- Place: Atlantic: 4th; League: 6th
- Stage 1 Playoffs: Did not qualify
- Stage 2 Playoffs: Finals
- Stage 3 Playoffs: Did not qualify
- Stage 4 Playoffs: Did not qualify
- Season Playoffs: Grand Finals
- Total Earnings: $525,000

The 2018 Philadelphia Fusion season was the first season of the Philadelphia Fusion's existence in the Overwatch League. The team finished with a regular season record of 24–16, which was the fifth best in the Overwatch League. Philadelphia had the same record as the London Spitfire, but London held the tiebreaker by map differential. Philadelphia qualified for the Stage 2 playoffs, in which they lost in the finals against the New York Excelsior. The team also qualified for the Season Playoffs, in which they lost in the Grand Finals against the London Spitfire.

== Preceding offseason ==
On November 3, 2017, Fusion announced their inaugural season roster, consisting of the following players:

- Lee "Carpe" Jae-hyeok
- Simon "Snillo" Ekström
- Georgii "ShaDowBurn" Gushcha
- Josue "Eqo" Corona
- Kim "SADO" Su-min
- Joona "fragi" Laine
- Alberto "Neptuno" González Molinillo
- Park "DayFly" Jeong-hwan
- Joseph "Joemeister" Gramano
- Isaac "Boombox" Charles
- Choi "Hotba" Hong-jun
- Gael "Poko" Gouzerch

Due to "player logistics issues," the Philadelphia Fusion did not participate in preseason play.

== Review ==
=== Regular season ===
Philadelphia's first regular season OWL match was a 3–2 victory against the Houston Outlaws on January 11. On January 25, Philadelphia upset the undefeated New York Excelsior, which marked New York's only loss in Stage 1. With a lack of preparation time heading into the regular season, the team struggled for form in Stage 1 and would only manage to notch 6 victories, missing the Stage 1 Playoffs.

Using the stage-break to catch up on lost practice time and welcoming the arrival of Israeli DPS player Josue "Eqo" Corana, Stage 2 would prove to be a turning point for the team. After opening up the stage with back-to-back sweeps over the Boston Uprising and Florida Mayhem, the team would continue to impress and go on to achieve a much improved 3rd-place finish – good enough for a stage playoffs berth. During the Stage 2 Playoffs, the team surprised many after defeating heavily favored Stage 1 champions London Spitfire in the semi-finals, however a finals match-up with the New York Excelsior would prove a juggernaut too much as the Fusion would fall short in a hard-fought 5-map match.

Heading into the final match of Stage 3 on May 5, the Fusion needed a win over the Los Angeles Valiant for a shot to claim the 4th seed in the Stage 3 playoff bracket. However, the Valiant proved too much to handle, as they defeated the Fusion by a score of 3–2 and claimed the 4th seed for their own.

After Dallas Fuel's upset 3–1 win over the Los Angeles Valiant on June 15, Philadelphia needed a 4–0 sweep over the London Spitfire in order to make the Stage 4 Playoffs. While the Fusion were victorious in that matchup, they were only able to win by a score of 3–1 and subsequently, missed the Stage 4 Playoffs.

=== Season playoffs ===
Philadelphia Fusion claimed the 6th seed in the Season Playoffs on June 15, after Seoul Dynasty lost to the Los Angeles Gladiators. During the Post-Season Playoffs, Philadelphia Fusion first faced the Boston Uprising. After a dominant first game they lost the second one, forcing a tie-breaker game which Fusion managed to win. After that they faced the New York Excelsior, who were heavy favorites to win the Post-Season playoffs. Fusion upset them in the first game, winning 3–0 and then narrowly winning the second game 3–2, which sent them to the grand finals. In the Grand Finals they faced another underdog; the London Spitifire. The Spitfire however showed the potential their team had and beat the Fusion in a best-of-3-game series, winning 2–0.

== Final roster ==
2018 Philadelphia Fusion roster
Players
Coaches

| Role | No. | Handle | Name | Nationality |
|---|---|---|---|---|
| Damage | 3 | snillo | Ekström, Simon | Sweden |
| Damage | 13 | ShaDowBurn | Gushcha, Georgii | Russia |
| Damage | 15 | Eqo | Corona, Josue | Israel |
| Damage | 18 | Carpe | Lee Jae-hyeok | South Korea |
| Tank | 9 | SADO | Kim Su-min | South Korea |
| Tank | 54 | Fragi | Laine, Joona | Finland |
| Support | 8 | neptuNo | González, Alberto | Spain |
| Support | 10 | DayFly | Park Jeong-hwan | South Korea |
| Support | 23 | Joemeister | Gramano, Joseph | Canada |
| Support | 42 | Boombox | Charles, Isaac | England |
| Flex | 7 | HOTBA | Choi Hong-jun | South Korea |
| Flex | 21 | Poko | Gouzerch, Gael | France |

Head coach

- Yann Luu

Legend:
- (I) Inactive
- (S) Suspended
- (2W) Two-way player
- Substitute
- (injured) Injury / Illness

Latest roster transaction: November 3, 2017.

== Standings ==
=== Record by stage ===
| Stage | Pld | W | L | Pct | MW | ML | MT | MD | Pos |
|---|---|---|---|---|---|---|---|---|---|
| 1 | 10 | 6 | 4 | .600 | 20 | 24 | 1 | -4 | 7 |
| 2 | 10 | 7 | 3 | .700 | 27 | 15 | 0 | +12 | 3 |
| 3 | 10 | 5 | 5 | .500 | 24 | 23 | 0 | +1 | 7 |
| 4 | 10 | 6 | 4 | .600 | 22 | 18 | 1 | +4 | 6 |
| Overall | 40 | 24 | 16 | .600 | 93 | 80 | 2 | +13 | 6 |
Qualified for playoffs

=== League ===
| Pos | Div | Team | Pld | W | L | PCT | MW | ML | MT | MD | Qualification |
|---|---|---|---|---|---|---|---|---|---|---|---|
| 1 | ATL | New York Excelsior | 40 | 34 | 6 | 0.850 | 126 | 43 | 4 | +83 | Advance to season playoffs semifinals |
| 2 | PAC | Los Angeles Valiant | 40 | 27 | 13 | 0.675 | 100 | 64 | 7 | +36 | Advance to season playoffs semifinals |
| 3 | ATL | Boston Uprising | 40 | 26 | 14 | 0.650 | 99 | 71 | 3 | +28 | Advance to season playoffs quarterfinals |
| 4 | PAC | Los Angeles Gladiators | 40 | 25 | 15 | 0.625 | 96 | 72 | 3 | +24 | Advance to season playoffs quarterfinals |
| 5 | ATL | London Spitfire | 40 | 24 | 16 | 0.600 | 102 | 69 | 3 | +33 | Advance to season playoffs quarterfinals |
| 6 | ATL | Philadelphia Fusion | 40 | 24 | 16 | 0.600 | 93 | 80 | 2 | +13 | Advance to season playoffs quarterfinals |
| 7 | ATL | Houston Outlaws | 40 | 22 | 18 | 0.550 | 94 | 77 | 2 | +17 | |
| 8 | PAC | Seoul Dynasty | 40 | 22 | 18 | 0.550 | 91 | 78 | 3 | +13 | |
| 9 | PAC | San Francisco Shock | 40 | 17 | 23 | 0.425 | 77 | 84 | 5 | −7 | |
| 10 | PAC | Dallas Fuel | 40 | 12 | 28 | 0.300 | 58 | 100 | 7 | −42 | |
| 11 | ATL | Florida Mayhem | 40 | 7 | 33 | 0.175 | 42 | 120 | 5 | −78 | |
| 12 | PAC | Shanghai Dragons | 40 | 0 | 40 | 0.000 | 21 | 141 | 2 | −120 | |

Source: The Overwatch League
Rules for classification: 1) winning percentage; 2) map differential; 3) head-to-head map differential; 4) head-to-head record

== Game log ==
=== Regular season ===
2018 game log (Regular season record: 24–16)
Stage 1 (6–4)

| 1 | January 11 | Philadelphia Fusion | 3 | – | 2 | Houston Outlaws | Burbank, CA |

| 2 | January 13 | London Spitfire | 4 | – | 0 | Philadelphia Fusion | Burbank, CA |

| 3 | January 17 | San Francisco Shock | 1 | – | 2 | Philadelphia Fusion | Burbank, CA |

| 4 | January 18 | Philadelphia Fusion | 2 | – | 3 | Los Angeles Gladiators | Burbank, CA |

| 5 | January 25 | Philadelphia Fusion | 3 | – | 2 | New York Excelsior | Burbank, CA |

| 6 | January 26 | Shanghai Dragons | 2 | – | 3 | Philadelphia Fusion | Burbank, CA |

| 7 | January 31 | Los Angeles Valiant | 4 | – | 0 | Philadelphia Fusion | Burbank, CA |

| 8 | February 01 | Philadelphia Fusion | 4 | – | 0 | Dallas Fuel | Burbank, CA |

| 9 | February 08 | Philadelphia Fusion | 0 | – | 4 | Boston Uprising | Burbank, CA |

| 10 | February 10 | Florida Mayhem | 2 | – | 3 | Philadelphia Fusion | Burbank, CA |

Stage 2 (7–3)

| 11 | February 22 | Boston Uprising | 0 | – | 4 | Philadelphia Fusion | Burbank, CA |

| 12 | February 24 | Philadelphia Fusion | 4 | – | 0 | Florida Mayhem | Burbank, CA |

| 13 | March 01 | Houston Outlaws | 2 | – | 3 | Philadelphia Fusion | Burbank, CA |

| 14 | March 03 | Philadelphia Fusion | 0 | – | 4 | London Spitfire | Burbank, CA |

| 15 | March 08 | Philadelphia Fusion | 1 | – | 3 | Seoul Dynasty | Burbank, CA |

| 16 | March 09 | New York Excelsior | 3 | – | 1 | Philadelphia Fusion | Burbank, CA |

| 17 | March 15 | Philadelphia Fusion | 4 | – | 0 | Shanghai Dragons | Burbank, CA |

| 18 | March 17 | Dallas Fuel | 0 | – | 4 | Philadelphia Fusion | Burbank, CA |

| 19 | March 21 | Los Angeles Gladiators | 1 | – | 3 | Philadelphia Fusion | Burbank, CA |

| 20 | March 23 | Philadelphia Fusion | 3 | – | 2 | Los Angeles Valiant | Burbank, CA |

Stage 3 (5–5)

| 21 | April 05 | Philadelphia Fusion | 2 | – | 3 | Boston Uprising | Burbank, CA |

| 22 | April 07 | Florida Mayhem | 1 | – | 3 | Philadelphia Fusion | Burbank, CA |

| 23 | April 12 | Philadelphia Fusion | 3 | – | 2 | Houston Outlaws | Burbank, CA |

| 24 | April 14 | London Spitfire | 2 | – | 3 | Philadelphia Fusion | Burbank, CA |

| 25 | April 19 | Philadelphia Fusion | 2 | – | 3 | New York Excelsior | Burbank, CA |

| 26 | April 20 | Philadelphia Fusion | 1 | – | 3 | San Francisco Shock | Burbank, CA |

| 27 | April 26 | Seoul Dynasty | 3 | – | 2 | Philadelphia Fusion | Burbank, CA |

| 28 | April 28 | Shanghai Dragons | 2 | – | 3 | Philadelphia Fusion | Burbank, CA |

| 29 | May 02 | Philadelphia Fusion | 3 | – | 1 | Dallas Fuel | Burbank, CA |

| 30 | May 05 | Los Angeles Valiant | 3 | – | 2 | Philadelphia Fusion | Burbank, CA |

Stage 4 (6–4)

| 31 | May 17 | Boston Uprising | 1 | – | 3 | Philadelphia Fusion | Burbank, CA |

| 32 | May 19 | Philadelphia Fusion | 4 | – | 0 | Florida Mayhem | Burbank, CA |

| 33 | May 24 | Philadelphia Fusion | 4 | – | 0 | Shanghai Dragons | Burbank, CA |

| 34 | May 26 | Dallas Fuel | 3 | – | 1 | Philadelphia Fusion | Burbank, CA |

| 35 | May 30 | New York Excelsior | 4 | – | 0 | Philadelphia Fusion | Burbank, CA |

| 36 | May 31 | Philadelphia Fusion | 1 | – | 3 | Los Angeles Gladiators | Burbank, CA |

| 37 | June 07 | San Francisco Shock | 1 | – | 2 | Philadelphia Fusion | Burbank, CA |

| 38 | June 08 | Philadelphia Fusion | 3 | – | 2 | Seoul Dynasty | Burbank, CA |

| 39 | June 14 | Houston Outlaws | 3 | – | 1 | Philadelphia Fusion | Burbank, CA |

| 40 | June 16 | Philadelphia Fusion | 3 | – | 1 | London Spitfire | Burbank, CA |

=== Playoffs ===
2018 playoff game log
Stage 2 Playoffs (1–1)

| Semifinals | March 25 | Philadelphia Fusion | 3 | – | 2 | London Spitfire | Burbank, CA |

| Finals | March 25 | Philadelphia Fusion | 2 | – | 3 | New York Excelsior | Burbank, CA |

Season Playoffs (4–3)

| Quarterfinals Match 1 | July 11 | Philadelphia Fusion | 3 | – | 1 | Boston Uprising | Burbank, CA |

| Quarterfinals Match 2 | July 13 | Philadelphia Fusion | 1 | – | 3 | Boston Uprising | Burbank, CA |

| Quarterfinals Match 3 | July 13 | Philadelphia Fusion | 3 | – | 1 | Boston Uprising | Burbank, CA |

| Semifinals Match 1 | July 18 | Philadelphia Fusion | 3 | – | 1 | New York Excelsior | Burbank, CA |

| Semifinals Match 2 | July 21 | Philadelphia Fusion | 3 | – | 2 | New York Excelsior | Burbank, CA |

| Grand Finals Match 1 | July 27 | Philadelphia Fusion | 1 | – | 3 | London Spitfire | Brooklyn, NY |

| Grand Finals Match 2 | July 28 | Philadelphia Fusion | 0 | – | 3 | London Spitfire | Brooklyn, NY |
