= 2018 London Spitfire season =

- Overwatch League champions
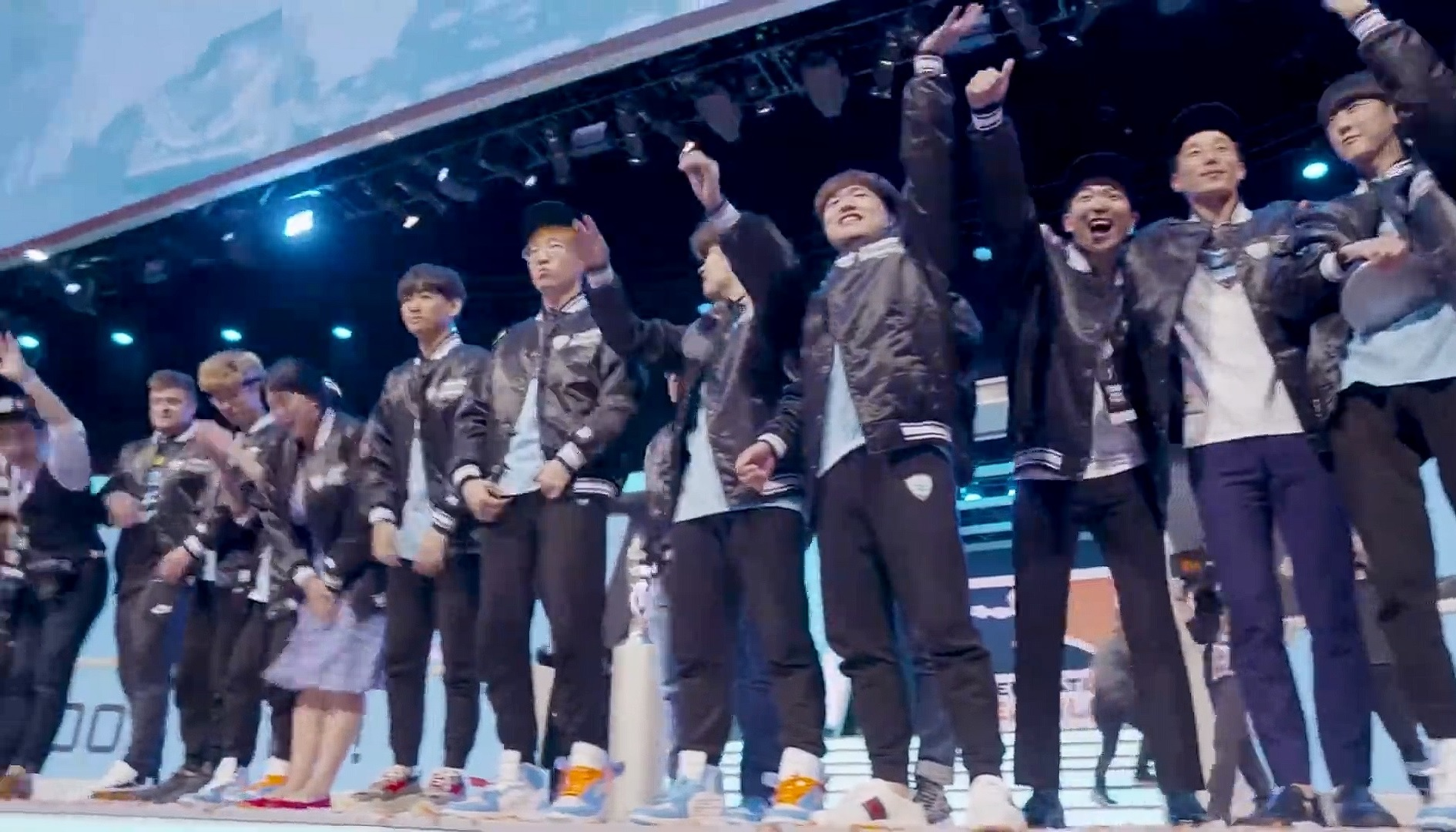
- Spitfire after winning the 2018 Grand Finals
- Head coach: Lee Beom-joon (rel. 7 Mar)
- Owner: Jack Etienne
- Division: Pacific

Results
- Record: 24–16 (.600)
- Place: Pacific: 3rd; League: 5th
- Stage 1 Playoffs: Champions
- Stage 2 Playoffs: Semifinals
- Stage 3 Playoffs: Did not qualify
- Stage 4 Playoffs: Did not qualify
- Season Playoffs: Champions
- Total Earnings: $1,200,000

The 2018 London Spitfire season was the first season of the London Spitfire's existence in the Overwatch League. The team finished with a regular season record of 24–16, which was the fifth best in the Overwatch League.

London qualified for the Stage 1 and Stage 2 Playoffs. In the stage 1 playoffs, London defeated the Houston Outlaws in the semifinals and New York Excelsior in the finals. The team lost in the Stage 2 semifinals to the Philadelphia Fusion. The team also qualified for the Season Playoffs, in which they won in the Grand Finals against the Philadelphia Fusion.

== Preceding offseason ==
Cloud9 was awarded the London slot for an OWL franchise on 10 August 2017 and was later named the London Spitfire. Shortly afterwards, they disclosed their 12-player inaugural season roster, the maximum permitted, which would be entirely composed of the following South Korean players:

- Kim "birdring" Ji-hyeok
- Park "Profit" Joon-yeong
- Kim "Rascal" Dong-jun
- Lee "Hooreg" Dong-eun
- Hong "Gesture" Jae-hui
- Baek "Fissure" Chan-hyung
- Choi "Bdosin" Seung-tae
- Kim "NUS" Jong-seok
- Jung "Closer" Won-sik
- Jo "HaGoPeun" Hyeon-woo
- Kim "Fury" Jun-ho
- Seong "WooHyaL" Seung-hyun

The roster would mainly be an amalgamation of their current Cloud9 KONGDOO core and OGN's Overwatch APEX Season 4 champions GC Busan.

== Review ==
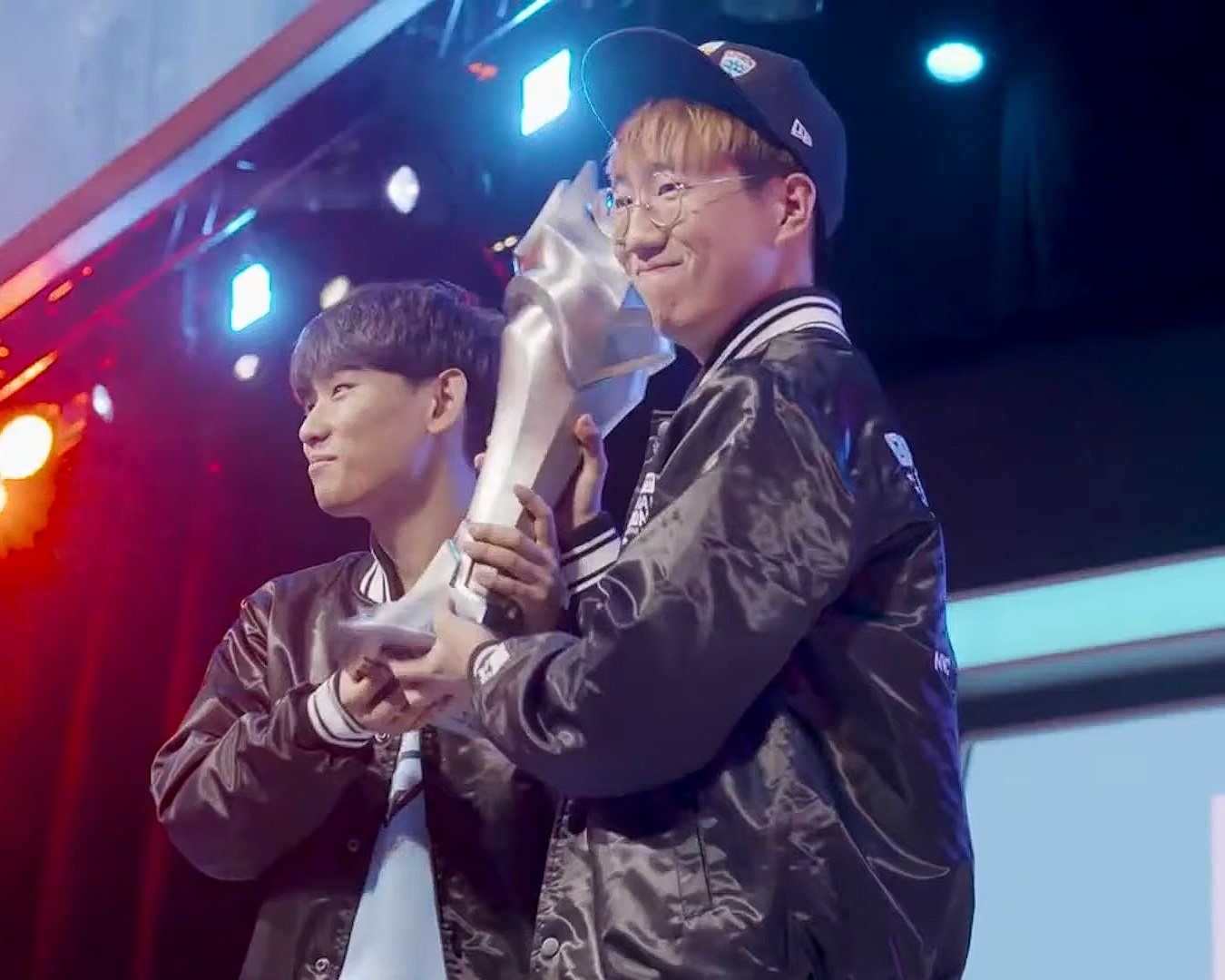
The Spitfire won the 2018 Grand Finals.

=== Regular season ===
On 11 January, the Spitfire played their first regular season Overwatch League match in a 3–1 victory over the Florida Mayhem. They would end Stage 1 of the 2018 Season with a 7–3 record, earning them the third and final spot in the Stage 1 Playoffs. The team then became the first-ever stage playoffs champions, after achieving victories over the Houston Outlaws (3–1) and the New York Excelsior (3–2) in a reverse sweep.

On 7 March 2018, midway through Stage 2, the Spitfire parted ways with head coach Lee "Bishop" Beom-joon for undisclosed reasons. The team finished Stage 2 with an improved 8–2 record and attained another stage playoffs berth. However, they fell short to the Philadelphia Fusion in a thrilling 2–3 semi-finals series.

However, after stage 2, the Spitfire failed to make another stage playoffs, going 5–5 in stage 3 and 4–6 in stage 4. They had to bank on their earlier results to edge them over the finish line. They would end the season with a 24–16 record, good for 5th place and a spot in the postseason where they would face the Los Angeles Gladiators.

=== Playoffs ===
London lost their first postseason matchup against the Gladiators on 11 July by a score of 0–3 in the quarterfinals. The Spitfire turned it around the next two games against the Gladiators, winning in 3–0 sweeps in matches two and three and advancing the team to the semifinals. London won both games against the Los Angeles Valiant in the semifinals, winning 3–0 in match one and 3–1 in match two. London claimed the 2018 Overwatch League championship after defeating the Philadelphia Fusion on 27 and 28 July by scores of 3–1 and 3–0, respectively.

== Final roster ==
2018 London Spitfire roster
Players
Coaches

| Role | No. | Handle | Name | Nationality |
|---|---|---|---|---|
| Damage | 13 | Profit | Park Jun-yeung | South Korea |
| Damage | 20 | birdring | Kim Ji-hyeok | South Korea |
| Tank | 7 | Gesture | Hong Jae-hee | South Korea |
| Support | 4 | Closer | Jung Won-sik | South Korea |
| Support | 8 | NUS | Kim Jong-seok | South Korea |
| Support | 22 | Bdosin | Choi Seung-tae | South Korea |
| Flex | 19 | Fury | Kim Jun-ho | South Korea |

Head coach

- Vacant

Legend:
- (I) Inactive
- (S) Suspended
- (2W) Two-way player
- Substitute
- (injured) Injury / Illness

Latest roster transaction: 18 June 2018.

=== Transactions ===
Transactions of/for players on the roster during the 2018 regular season:

- On 20 February, Spitfire transferred Baek "Fissure" Chan-hyung to Los Angeles Gladiators.
- On 21 February, Spitfire released Kim "Rascal" Dong-jun.
- On 8 March, Spitfire signed Hwang "TiZi" Jang-hyeon.
- On 18 June, Spitfire released Jo "HaGoPeun" Hyeon-woo, Hwang "TiZi" Jang-hyeon, Seong "WooHyaL" Seung-hyun, and Lee "Hooreg" Dong-eun.

== Standings ==
=== Record by stage ===
| Stage | Pld | W | L | Pct | MW | ML | MT | MD | Pos |
|---|---|---|---|---|---|---|---|---|---|
| 1 | 10 | 7 | 3 | .700 | 29 | 14 | 0 | +15 | 3 |
| 2 | 10 | 8 | 2 | .800 | 31 | 11 | 0 | +20 | 2 |
| 3 | 10 | 5 | 5 | .500 | 24 | 21 | 1 | +3 | 6 |
| 4 | 10 | 4 | 6 | .400 | 18 | 23 | 2 | -5 | 9 |
| Overall | 40 | 24 | 16 | .600 | 102 | 69 | 3 | +33 | 5 |
Qualified for playoffs

=== League ===
| Pos | Div | Team | Pld | W | L | PCT | MW | ML | MT | MD | Qualification |
|---|---|---|---|---|---|---|---|---|---|---|---|
| 1 | ATL | New York Excelsior | 40 | 34 | 6 | 0.850 | 126 | 43 | 4 | +83 | Advance to season playoffs semifinals |
| 2 | PAC | Los Angeles Valiant | 40 | 27 | 13 | 0.675 | 100 | 64 | 7 | +36 | Advance to season playoffs semifinals |
| 3 | ATL | Boston Uprising | 40 | 26 | 14 | 0.650 | 99 | 71 | 3 | +28 | Advance to season playoffs quarterfinals |
| 4 | PAC | Los Angeles Gladiators | 40 | 25 | 15 | 0.625 | 96 | 72 | 3 | +24 | Advance to season playoffs quarterfinals |
| 5 | ATL | London Spitfire | 40 | 24 | 16 | 0.600 | 102 | 69 | 3 | +33 | Advance to season playoffs quarterfinals |
| 6 | ATL | Philadelphia Fusion | 40 | 24 | 16 | 0.600 | 93 | 80 | 2 | +13 | Advance to season playoffs quarterfinals |
| 7 | ATL | Houston Outlaws | 40 | 22 | 18 | 0.550 | 94 | 77 | 2 | +17 | |
| 8 | PAC | Seoul Dynasty | 40 | 22 | 18 | 0.550 | 91 | 78 | 3 | +13 | |
| 9 | PAC | San Francisco Shock | 40 | 17 | 23 | 0.425 | 77 | 84 | 5 | −7 | |
| 10 | PAC | Dallas Fuel | 40 | 12 | 28 | 0.300 | 58 | 100 | 7 | −42 | |
| 11 | ATL | Florida Mayhem | 40 | 7 | 33 | 0.175 | 42 | 120 | 5 | −78 | |
| 12 | PAC | Shanghai Dragons | 40 | 0 | 40 | 0.000 | 21 | 141 | 2 | −120 | |

Source: The Overwatch League
Rules for classification: 1) winning percentage; 2) map differential; 3) head-to-head map differential; 4) head-to-head record

== Game log ==
=== Preseason ===
2018 preseason game log
Preseason (1–1)

| 1 | 7 December | Los Angeles Gladiators | 3 | – | 2 | London Spitfire | Burbank, CA |

| 2 | 8 December | San Francisco Shock | 0 | – | 4 | London Spitfire | Burbank, CA |

=== Regular season ===
2018 game log (Regular season record: 24–16)
Stage 1 (7–3)

| 1 | 11 January | London Spitfire | 3 | – | 1 | Florida Mayhem | Burbank, CA |

| 2 | 13 January | London Spitfire | 4 | – | 0 | Philadelphia Fusion | Burbank, CA |

| 3 | 19 January | London Spitfire | 3 | – | 1 | Dallas Fuel | Burbank, CA |

| 4 | 20 January | Los Angeles Valiant | 2 | – | 3 | London Spitfire | Burbank, CA |

| 5 | 24 January | San Francisco Shock | 1 | – | 3 | London Spitfire | Burbank, CA |

| 6 | 25 January | Boston Uprising | 3 | – | 2 | London Spitfire | Burbank, CA |

| 7 | 1 February | London Spitfire | 4 | – | 0 | Seoul Dynasty | Burbank, CA |

| 8 | 3 February | Shanghai Dragons | 0 | – | 4 | London Spitfire | Burbank, CA |

| 9 | 8 February | London Spitfire | 1 | – | 3 | Houston Outlaws | Burbank, CA |

| 10 | 10 February | New York Excelsior | 3 | – | 2 | London Spitfire | Burbank, CA |

Stage 2 (8–2)

| 11 | 22 February | Houston Outlaws | 3 | – | 2 | London Spitfire | Burbank, CA |

| 12 | 23 February | London Spitfire | 3 | – | 2 | New York Excelsior | Burbank, CA |

| 13 | 1 March | Florida Mayhem | 1 | – | 3 | London Spitfire | Burbank, CA |

| 14 | 3 March | Philadelphia Fusion | 0 | – | 4 | London Spitfire | Burbank, CA |

| 15 | 9 March | London Spitfire | 4 | – | 0 | Boston Uprising | Burbank, CA |

| 16 | 10 March | London Spitfire | 1 | – | 3 | Los Angeles Gladiators | Burbank, CA |

| 17 | 16 March | London Spitfire | 3 | – | 1 | San Francisco Shock | Burbank, CA |

| 18 | 17 March | Seoul Dynasty | 0 | – | 4 | London Spitfire | Burbank, CA |

| 19 | 24 March | London Spitfire | 4 | – | 0 | Shanghai Dragons | Burbank, CA |

| 20 | 24 March | Dallas Fuel | 1 | – | 3 | London Spitfire | Burbank, CA |

Stage 3 (5–5)

| 21 | 5 April | London Spitfire | 2 | – | 3 | Houston Outlaws | Burbank, CA |

| 22 | 7 April | New York Excelsior | 4 | – | 0 | London Spitfire | Burbank, CA |

| 23 | 12 April | London Spitfire | 3 | – | 0 | Florida Mayhem | Burbank, CA |

| 24 | 14 April | London Spitfire | 2 | – | 3 | Philadelphia Fusion | Burbank, CA |

| 25 | 19 April | Boston Uprising | 3 | – | 2 | London Spitfire | Burbank, CA |

| 26 | 21 April | London Spitfire | 3 | – | 2 | Los Angeles Valiant | Burbank, CA |

| 27 | 26 April | Los Angeles Gladiators | 3 | – | 2 | London Spitfire | Burbank, CA |

| 28 | 28 April | San Francisco Shock | 0 | – | 4 | London Spitfire | Burbank, CA |

| 29 | 4 May | London Spitfire | 3 | – | 2 | Seoul Dynasty | Burbank, CA |

| 30 | 5 May | Shanghai Dragons | 1 | – | 3 | London Spitfire | Burbank, CA |

Stage 4 (4–6)

| 31 | 17 May | Houston Outlaws | 4 | – | 0 | London Spitfire | Burbank, CA |

| 32 | 19 May | London Spitfire | 1 | – | 3 | New York Excelsior | Burbank, CA |

| 33 | 24 May | London Spitfire | 3 | – | 2 | San Francisco Shock | Burbank, CA |

| 34 | 26 May | Seoul Dynasty | 2 | – | 3 | London Spitfire | Burbank, CA |

| 35 | 31 May | London Spitfire | 2 | – | 1 | Boston Uprising | Burbank, CA |

| 36 | 2 June | London Spitfire | 1 | – | 3 | Dallas Fuel | Burbank, CA |

| 37 | 7 June | Los Angeles Valiant | 2 | – | 1 | London Spitfire | Burbank, CA |

| 38 | 9 June | London Spitfire | 2 | – | 3 | Los Angeles Gladiators | Burbank, CA |

| 39 | 14 June | Florida Mayhem | 0 | – | 4 | London Spitfire | Burbank, CA |

| 40 | 16 June | Philadelphia Fusion | 3 | – | 1 | London Spitfire | Burbank, CA |

=== Playoffs ===
2018 playoff game log
Stage 1 Playoffs (2–0)

| Semifinals | 10 February | London Spitfire | 3 | – | 1 | Houston Outlaws | Burbank, CA |

| Finals | 10 February | London Spitfire | 3 | – | 2 | New York Excelsior | Burbank, CA |

Stage 2 Playoffs (0–1)

| Semifinals | 25 March | Philadelphia Fusion | 3 | – | 2 | London Spitfire | Burbank, CA |

Season Playoffs (6–1)

| Quarterfinals Match 1 | 11 July | London Spitfire | 0 | – | 3 | Los Angeles Gladiators | Burbank, CA |

| Quarterfinals Match 2 | 14 July | London Spitfire | 3 | – | 0 | Los Angeles Gladiators | Burbank, CA |

| Quarterfinals Match 3 | 14 July | London Spitfire | 3 | – | 0 | Los Angeles Gladiators | Burbank, CA |

| Semifinals Match 1 | 18 July | London Spitfire | 3 | – | 1 | Los Angeles Valiant | Burbank, CA |

| Semifinals Match 2 | 20 July | London Spitfire | 3 | – | 0 | Los Angeles Valiant | Burbank, CA |

| Grand Finals Match 1 | 27 July | Philadelphia Fusion | 1 | – | 3 | London Spitfire | Brooklyn, NY |

| Grand Finals Match 2 | 28 July | Philadelphia Fusion | 0 | – | 3 | London Spitfire | Brooklyn, NY |
