= 2018 Houston Outlaws season =

- Head coach: Kim Tae-yeong
- General manager: Matt Rodriguez
- Owner: Hector Rodriguez
- Division: Atlantic

Results
- Record: 22–18 (.550)
- Place: Atlantic: 5th; League: 7th
- Stage 1 Playoffs: Semifinals
- Stage 2 Playoffs: Did not qualify
- Stage 3 Playoffs: Did not qualify
- Stage 4 Playoffs: Did not qualify
- Season Playoffs: Did not qualify
- Total Earnings: $75,000

The 2018 Houston Outlaws season was the first season of the Houston Outlaws's existence in the Overwatch League. Outlaws qualified for the Stage 1 playoffs but fell to the London Spitfire in the semifinals. The team did not qualify finished with a regular season record of 22–18, missing the season playoffs.

== Preceding offseason ==
On October 31, 2017, Houston Outlaws announced their inaugural season roster, consisting of the following players:

- Matthew "Clockwork" Dias
- Lucas "Mendokusaii" Håkansson
- Jiri "LiNkzr" Masalin
- Jake "Jake" Lyon
- Austin "Muma" Wilmot
- Matt "Coolmatt" Iorio
- Shane "Rawkus" Flaherty
- Christopher "Bani" Benell
- Daniel "Boink" Pence
- Alexandre "SPREE" Vanhomwegen

== Regular season ==
=== Review ===
On January 11, the Outlaws played their first regular season Overwatch League match, a 3–2 loss to the Philadelphia Fusion. One week later, on January 17, Houston claimed their first victory after sweeping the Shanghai Dragons 4–0. Houston went on to qualify for the Stage 1 playoffs but fell to the London Spitfire in the semifinals.

Houston entered their last regular season match against the New York Excelsior needing a win to keep their season playoff hopes alive. The Outlaws had a 2–1 lead after three matches, but New York won the next three straight to take the win 3–2. The team finished with a regular season record of 22–18.

== Final roster ==
2018 Houston Outlaws roster
Players
Coaches

Role	No.	Handle	Name	Nationality
Damage	11	Clockwork	Dias, Matthew	United States
Damage	12	Mendokusaii	Håkansson, Lucas	Sweden
Damage	49	LiNkzr	Masalin, Jiri	Finland
Damage	76	JAKE	Lyon, Jacob	United States
Tank	2	FCTFCTN	Campbell, Russell	United States
Tank	17	Muma	Wilmot, Austin	United States
Tank	69	Coolmatt	Iorio, Matt	United States
Support	1	Rawkus	Flaherty, Shane	United States
Support	3	Bani	Benell, Christopher	Canada
Support	13	Boink	Pence, Daniel	United States
Flex	7	SPREE	Vanhomwegen, Alexandre	Belgium
Flex	57	ArHaN	Jung Won-hyeop	South Korea

Head coach

- Kim Tae-yeong

Legend:
- (I) Inactive
- (S) Suspended
- (2W) Two-way player
- Substitute
- (injured) Injury / Illness

Latest roster transaction: March 30, 2018.

=== Transactions ===
Transactions of/for players on the roster during the 2018 regular season:

- On February 16, Outlaws signed Russell "FCTFCTN" Campbell.
- On March 30, Outlaws signed Jung "ArHaN" Won-hyeop.

== Standings ==
=== Record by stage ===
Stage	Pld	W	L	Pct	MW	ML	MT	MD	Pos
1	10	7	3	.700	30	13	0	+17	2
2	10	5	5	.500	22	22	0	±0	7
3	10	4	6	.400	20	24	1	-4	9
4	10	6	4	.600	22	18	1	+4	8
Overall	40	22	18	.550	94	77	2	+17	7
Qualified for playoffs

=== League ===
Pos	Div	Team	Pld	W	L	PCT	MW	ML	MT	MD	Qualification
1	ATL	New York Excelsior	40	34	6	0.850	126	43	4	+83	Advance to season playoffs semifinals
2	PAC	Los Angeles Valiant	40	27	13	0.675	100	64	7	+36	Advance to season playoffs semifinals
3	ATL	Boston Uprising	40	26	14	0.650	99	71	3	+28	Advance to season playoffs quarterfinals
4	PAC	Los Angeles Gladiators	40	25	15	0.625	96	72	3	+24	Advance to season playoffs quarterfinals
5	ATL	London Spitfire	40	24	16	0.600	102	69	3	+33	Advance to season playoffs quarterfinals
6	ATL	Philadelphia Fusion	40	24	16	0.600	93	80	2	+13	Advance to season playoffs quarterfinals
7	ATL	Houston Outlaws	40	22	18	0.550	94	77	2	+17	
8	PAC	Seoul Dynasty	40	22	18	0.550	91	78	3	+13	
9	PAC	San Francisco Shock	40	17	23	0.425	77	84	5	−7	
10	PAC	Dallas Fuel	40	12	28	0.300	58	100	7	−42	
11	ATL	Florida Mayhem	40	7	33	0.175	42	120	5	−78	
12	PAC	Shanghai Dragons	40	0	40	0.000	21	141	2	−120	

Source: The Overwatch League
Rules for classification: 1) winning percentage; 2) map differential; 3) head-to-head map differential; 4) head-to-head record

== Game log ==
=== Preseason ===
2018 preseason game log
Preseason (0–2)

1	December 7	Dallas Fuel	3	–	2	Houston Outlaws	Burbank, CA

2	December 8	Seoul Dynasty	2	–	1	Houston Outlaws	Burbank, CA

=== Regular season ===
2018 game log (Regular season record: 22–18)
Stage 1 (7–3)

1	January 11	Philadelphia Fusion	3	–	2	Houston Outlaws	Burbank, CA

2	January 13	New York Excelsior	3	–	1	Houston Outlaws	Burbank, CA

3	January 17	Houston Outlaws	4	–	0	Shanghai Dragons	Burbank, CA

4	January 18	Dallas Fuel	0	–	4	Houston Outlaws	Burbank, CA

5	January 25	Houston Outlaws	4	–	0	Florida Mayhem	Burbank, CA

6	January 27	Los Angeles Gladiators	0	–	4	Houston Outlaws	Burbank, CA

7	January 31	Houston Outlaws	3	–	1	San Francisco Shock	Burbank, CA

8	February 02	Seoul Dynasty	3	–	2	Houston Outlaws	Burbank, CA

9	February 08	London Spitfire	1	–	3	Houston Outlaws	Burbank, CA

10	February 10	Houston Outlaws	3	–	2	Boston Uprising	Burbank, CA

Stage 2 (5–5)

11	February 22	Houston Outlaws	3	–	2	London Spitfire	Burbank, CA

12	February 24	Boston Uprising	0	–	4	Houston Outlaws	Burbank, CA

13	March 01	Houston Outlaws	2	–	3	Philadelphia Fusion	Burbank, CA

14	March 03	Houston Outlaws	0	–	4	New York Excelsior	Burbank, CA

15	March 08	Houston Outlaws	0	–	4	Los Angeles Valiant	Burbank, CA

16	March 09	Florida Mayhem	2	–	3	Houston Outlaws	Burbank, CA

17	March 15	Houston Outlaws	2	–	3	Los Angeles Gladiators	Burbank, CA

18	March 17	San Francisco Shock	3	–	1	Houston Outlaws	Burbank, CA

19	March 22	Shanghai Dragons	0	–	4	Houston Outlaws	Burbank, CA

20	March 22	Houston Outlaws	3	–	1	Seoul Dynasty	Burbank, CA

Stage 3 (4–6)

21	April 05	London Spitfire	2	–	3	Houston Outlaws	Burbank, CA

22	April 07	Houston Outlaws	0	–	4	Boston Uprising	Burbank, CA

23	April 12	Philadelphia Fusion	3	–	2	Houston Outlaws	Burbank, CA

24	April 14	New York Excelsior	3	–	2	Houston Outlaws	Burbank, CA

25	April 19	Houston Outlaws	3	–	1	Florida Mayhem	Burbank, CA

26	April 21	Houston Outlaws	3	–	0	Dallas Fuel	Burbank, CA

27	April 25	Los Angeles Valiant	1	–	3	Houston Outlaws	Burbank, CA

28	April 27	Los Angeles Gladiators	3	–	2	Houston Outlaws	Burbank, CA

29	May 02	Houston Outlaws	2	–	3	San Francisco Shock	Burbank, CA

30	May 05	Seoul Dynasty	4	–	0	Houston Outlaws	Burbank, CA

Stage 4 (6–4)

31	May 17	Houston Outlaws	4	–	0	London Spitfire	Burbank, CA

32	May 18	Boston Uprising	1	–	3	Houston Outlaws	Burbank, CA

33	May 23	Houston Outlaws	1	–	3	Los Angeles Gladiators	Burbank, CA

34	May 25	San Francisco Shock	4	–	0	Houston Outlaws	Burbank, CA

35	June 01	Houston Outlaws	3	–	0	Shanghai Dragons	Burbank, CA

36	June 02	Florida Mayhem	1	–	3	Houston Outlaws	Burbank, CA

37	June 06	Dallas Fuel	1	–	3	Houston Outlaws	Burbank, CA

38	June 09	Houston Outlaws	0	–	4	Los Angeles Valiant	Burbank, CA

39	June 14	Houston Outlaws	3	–	1	Philadelphia Fusion	Burbank, CA

40	June 15	Houston Outlaws	2	–	3	New York Excelsior	Burbank, CA

=== Playoffs ===
2018 playoff game log
Stage 1 Playoffs (0–1)

Semifinals	February 10	London Spitfire	3	–	1	Houston Outlaws	Burbank, CA
