= 2018 Los Angeles Valiant season =

- Pacific Division champions
- Head coach: Henry Coxall (rel. Feb 19); Moon Byung-chul
- Owner: Noah Whinston
- Division: Pacific

Results
- Record: 27–13 (.675)
- Place: Pacific: 1st; League: 2nd
- Stage 1 Playoffs: Did not qualify
- Stage 2 Playoffs: Did not qualify
- Stage 3 Playoffs: Semifinals
- Stage 4 Playoffs: Champions
- Season Playoffs: Semifinals
- Total Earnings: $400,000

The 2018 Los Angeles Valiant season was the first season of Los Angeles Valiant's existence in the Overwatch League. The team finished with a regular season record of 27–13 – the second best in the Overwatch League.

Los Angeles qualified for the Stage 3 and Stage 4 Playoffs. The team lost in the Stage 3 semifinals to the New York Excelsior. Los Angeles found revenge in the Stage 4 finals when the defeated the New York Excelsior. The team qualified for the Season Playoffs, but lost to the would-be champions London Spitfire in the semifinals.

== Preceding offseason ==
Valiant revealed their inaugural season starting roster over a series of Twitter posts from October 30 to November 2, consisting of the following players:

- Brady "Agilities" Girardi
- Terence "Soon" Tarlier
- Ted "silkthread" Wang
- Christopher "GrimReality" Schaefer
- Park "Kariv" Young-seo
- Stefano "Verbo" Disalvo
- Benjamin "uNKOE" Chevasson
- Indy "SPACE" Halpern
- Koo "Fate" Pan-seung
- Seb "Numlocked" Barton
- Lee "Envy" Kang-jae

== Review ==
Los Angeles Valiant's first OWL regular season game was a 4–0 victory against the San Francisco Shock on January 10, 2018. The Valiant posted an impressive 7–3 record in Stage 1, but did not qualify for the Stage 1 Playoffs. On February 19, two days before the beginning of Stage 2, the Los Angeles Valiant announced the departure of head coach Henry "Cuddles" Coxall. The team announced, on the same day, the hiring of Byung Chul "Moon" Moon as the team's new head coach. Stage 2 ended in a disappointing 4–6 record.

The Valiant had a more successful Stage 3, as the team posted a 7–3 record – good for the 3rd seed in the Stage 3 Playoffs. The team faced off against the 2nd-seeded New York Excelsior in the semifinals of the Stage 3 Playoffs, but the Valiant lost in a 0–3 sweep.

Los Angeles Valiant had its best stage in the 4th stage. The team was undefeated going into the final regular season game against the Dallas Fuel. The Valiant lost that matchup by a score of 3 to 1, giving them a 9–1 record and the 2nd seed for the Stage 4 Playoffs. The Valiant faced their intercity-rivals and top-seeded team, the Los Angeles Gladiators, in the semifinals, and were able to pull off a 3–2 victory to move on the finals against the New York Excelsior. On June 17, the Los Angeles Valiant claimed their first-ever stage title, defeating the Excelsior 3–1 in the Stage 4 Finals.

The Valiant ended the regular season with a 27–13 record and the 2nd seed and a first-round bye in the Season Playoffs. The team's was set to face the London Spitfire in the season semifinals. The first matchup was on July 18, in which the Valiant fell to the Spitfire by a score of 1–3. On July 20, the Valiant was eliminated from the Season Playoffs after getting swept 0–3 in the second semifinal match against the Spitfire.

== Final roster ==
2018 Los Angeles Valiant roster
Players
Coaches

| Role | No. | Handle | Name | Nationality |
|---|---|---|---|---|
| Damage | 8 | Bunny | Chae Joon-hyuk | South Korea |
| Damage | 9 | Agilities | Giradi, Brady | Canada |
| Damage | 27 | KSF | Frandanisa, Kyle | United States |
| Damage | 99 | SoOn | Tarlier, Terrence | France |
| Tank | 1 | Fate | Ko Pan-seung | South Korea |
| Tank | 6 | Numlocked | Barton, Sebastian | United Kingdom |
| Support | 10 | Custa | Kennedy, Scott | Australia |
| Support | 13 | Verbo | Disalvo, Stefano | United States |
| Support | 99 | KariV | Park Young-seo | South Korea |
| Flex | 8 | Finnsi | Jonasson, Finnbjorn | Iceland |
| Flex | 16 | SPACE | Halpern, Indy | United States |
| Flex | 22 | Izayaki | Kim Min-chul | South Korea |

Head coach

- Moon Byung-chul

Legend:
- (I) Inactive
- (S) Suspended
- (2W) Two-way player
- Substitute
- (injured) Injury / Illness

Latest roster transaction: April 13, 2018.

=== Transactions ===
Transactions of/for players on the roster during the 2018 regular season:

- On March 31, Valiant acquired Chae "Bunny" Jun-hyeok from Seoul Dynasty.
- On April 2, Valiant released Lee "Envy" Kang-jae and Christopher "GrimReality" Schaefer.
- On April 2, Valiant traded Benjamin "uNKOE" Chevasson to Dallas Fuel in exchange for Scott "Custa" Kennedy.
- On April 3, Valiant transferred Ted "silkthread" Wang to Los Angeles Gladiators.
- On April 4, Valiant signed Kyle "KSF" Frandanisa and Finnbjörn "Finnsi" Jónasson.
- On April 13, Valiant signed Kim "Izayaki" Min-chul.

== Standings ==
=== Record by stage ===
| Stage | Pld | W | L | Pct | MW | ML | MT | MD | Pos |
|---|---|---|---|---|---|---|---|---|---|
| 1 | 10 | 7 | 3 | .700 | 26 | 13 | 3 | +13 | 4 |
| 2 | 10 | 4 | 6 | .400 | 18 | 23 | 1 | -5 | 8 |
| 3 | 10 | 7 | 3 | .700 | 28 | 15 | 1 | +13 | 3 |
| 4 | 10 | 9 | 1 | .900 | 28 | 13 | 2 | +15 | 2 |
| Overall | 40 | 27 | 13 | .675 | 100 | 64 | 7 | +36 | 2 |
Qualified for playoffs

=== League ===
| Pos | Div | Team | Pld | W | L | PCT | MW | ML | MT | MD | Qualification |
|---|---|---|---|---|---|---|---|---|---|---|---|
| 1 | ATL | New York Excelsior | 40 | 34 | 6 | 0.850 | 126 | 43 | 4 | +83 | Advance to season playoffs semifinals |
| 2 | PAC | Los Angeles Valiant | 40 | 27 | 13 | 0.675 | 100 | 64 | 7 | +36 | Advance to season playoffs semifinals |
| 3 | ATL | Boston Uprising | 40 | 26 | 14 | 0.650 | 99 | 71 | 3 | +28 | Advance to season playoffs quarterfinals |
| 4 | PAC | Los Angeles Gladiators | 40 | 25 | 15 | 0.625 | 96 | 72 | 3 | +24 | Advance to season playoffs quarterfinals |
| 5 | ATL | London Spitfire | 40 | 24 | 16 | 0.600 | 102 | 69 | 3 | +33 | Advance to season playoffs quarterfinals |
| 6 | ATL | Philadelphia Fusion | 40 | 24 | 16 | 0.600 | 93 | 80 | 2 | +13 | Advance to season playoffs quarterfinals |
| 7 | ATL | Houston Outlaws | 40 | 22 | 18 | 0.550 | 94 | 77 | 2 | +17 | |
| 8 | PAC | Seoul Dynasty | 40 | 22 | 18 | 0.550 | 91 | 78 | 3 | +13 | |
| 9 | PAC | San Francisco Shock | 40 | 17 | 23 | 0.425 | 77 | 84 | 5 | −7 | |
| 10 | PAC | Dallas Fuel | 40 | 12 | 28 | 0.300 | 58 | 100 | 7 | −42 | |
| 11 | ATL | Florida Mayhem | 40 | 7 | 33 | 0.175 | 42 | 120 | 5 | −78 | |
| 12 | PAC | Shanghai Dragons | 40 | 0 | 40 | 0.000 | 21 | 141 | 2 | −120 | |

Source: The Overwatch League
Rules for classification: 1) winning percentage; 2) map differential; 3) head-to-head map differential; 4) head-to-head record

== Game log ==
=== Preseason ===
2018 preseason game log
Preseason (2–0)

| 1 | December 06 | Los Angeles Valiant | 3 | – | 2 | San Francisco Shock | Burbank, CA |

| 2 | December 09 | Los Angeles Valiant | 3 | – | 1 | Los Angeles Gladiators | Burbank, CA |

=== Regular season ===
2018 game log (Regular season record: 27–13)
Stage 1 (7–3)

| 1 | January 10 | San Francisco Shock | 0 | – | 4 | Los Angeles Valiant | Burbank, CA |

| 2 | January 12 | Los Angeles Valiant | 3 | – | 0 | Dallas Fuel | Burbank, CA |

| 3 | January 18 | New York Excelsior | 3 | – | 0 | Los Angeles Valiant | Burbank, CA |

| 4 | January 20 | Los Angeles Valiant | 2 | – | 3 | London Spitfire | Burbank, CA |

| 5 | January 24 | Los Angeles Gladiators | 2 | – | 3 | Los Angeles Valiant | Burbank, CA |

| 6 | January 27 | Los Angeles Valiant | 3 | – | 1 | Florida Mayhem | Burbank, CA |

| 7 | January 31 | Los Angeles Valiant | 4 | – | 0 | Philadelphia Fusion | Burbank, CA |

| 8 | February 03 | Boston Uprising | 4 | – | 0 | Los Angeles Valiant | Burbank, CA |

| 9 | February 07 | Los Angeles Valiant | 3 | – | 0 | Seoul Dynasty | Burbank, CA |

| 10 | February 09 | Los Angeles Valiant | 4 | – | 0 | Shanghai Dragons | Burbank, CA |

Stage 2 (4–6)

| 11 | February 21 | Seoul Dynasty | 4 | – | 0 | Los Angeles Valiant | Burbank, CA |

| 12 | February 24 | Shanghai Dragons | 0 | – | 3 | Los Angeles Valiant | Burbank, CA |

| 13 | February 28 | Los Angeles Valiant | 3 | – | 1 | San Francisco Shock | Burbank, CA |

| 14 | March 02 | Dallas Fuel | 1 | – | 3 | Los Angeles Valiant | Burbank, CA |

| 15 | March 07 | Los Angeles Valiant | 0 | – | 4 | Los Angeles Gladiators | Burbank, CA |

| 16 | March 08 | Houston Outlaws | 0 | – | 4 | Los Angeles Valiant | Burbank, CA |

| 17 | March 15 | Florida Mayhem | 3 | – | 1 | Los Angeles Valiant | Burbank, CA |

| 18 | March 16 | Los Angeles Valiant | 2 | – | 3 | Boston Uprising | Burbank, CA |

| 19 | March 23 | Philadelphia Fusion | 3 | – | 2 | Los Angeles Valiant | Burbank, CA |

| 20 | March 24 | Los Angeles Valiant | 0 | – | 4 | New York Excelsior | Burbank, CA |

Stage 3 (7–3)

| 21 | April 04 | Los Angeles Valiant | 4 | – | 0 | Seoul Dynasty | Burbank, CA |

| 22 | April 06 | Los Angeles Valiant | 4 | – | 0 | Shanghai Dragons | Burbank, CA |

| 23 | April 11 | San Francisco Shock | 0 | – | 4 | Los Angeles Valiant | Burbank, CA |

| 24 | April 13 | Los Angeles Valiant | 2 | – | 1 | Dallas Fuel | Burbank, CA |

| 25 | April 18 | Los Angeles Gladiators | 2 | – | 3 | Los Angeles Valiant | Burbank, CA |

| 26 | April 21 | London Spitfire | 3 | – | 2 | Los Angeles Valiant | Burbank, CA |

| 27 | April 25 | Los Angeles Valiant | 1 | – | 3 | Houston Outlaws | Burbank, CA |

| 28 | April 27 | Los Angeles Valiant | 3 | – | 1 | Florida Mayhem | Burbank, CA |

| 29 | May 03 | Boston Uprising | 3 | – | 2 | Los Angeles Valiant | Burbank, CA |

| 30 | May 05 | Los Angeles Valiant | 3 | – | 2 | Philadelphia Fusion | Burbank, CA |

Stage 4 (9–1)

| 31 | May 16 | Seoul Dynasty | 2 | – | 3 | Los Angeles Valiant | Burbank, CA |

| 32 | May 19 | Shanghai Dragons | 1 | – | 3 | Los Angeles Valiant | Burbank, CA |

| 33 | May 23 | Florida Mayhem | 1 | – | 3 | Los Angeles Valiant | Burbank, CA |

| 34 | May 25 | Los Angeles Valiant | 3 | – | 2 | Boston Uprising | Burbank, CA |

| 35 | May 30 | Los Angeles Valiant | 3 | – | 0 | Los Angeles Gladiators | Burbank, CA |

| 36 | June 02 | New York Excelsior | 2 | – | 3 | Los Angeles Valiant | Burbank, CA |

| 37 | June 07 | Los Angeles Valiant | 2 | – | 1 | London Spitfire | Burbank, CA |

| 38 | June 09 | Houston Outlaws | 0 | – | 4 | Los Angeles Valiant | Burbank, CA |

| 39 | June 13 | Los Angeles Valiant | 3 | – | 1 | San Francisco Shock | Burbank, CA |

| 40 | June 15 | Dallas Fuel | 3 | – | 1 | Los Angeles Valiant | Burbank, CA |

=== Playoffs ===
2018 playoff game log
Stage 3 Playoffs (0–1)

| Semifinals | May 06 | Los Angeles Valiant | 0 | – | 3 | New York Excelsior | Burbank, CA |

Stage 4 Playoffs (2–0)

| Semifinals | June 17 | Los Angeles Valiant | 3 | – | 2 | Los Angeles Gladiators | Burbank, CA |

| Finals | June 17 | New York Excelsior | 1 | – | 3 | Los Angeles Valiant | Burbank, CA |

Season Playoffs (0–2)

| Quarterfinals | First-round bye |

| Semifinals Match 1 | July 18 | London Spitfire | 3 | – | 1 | Los Angeles Valiant | Burbank, CA |

| Semifinals Match 2 | July 20 | London Spitfire | 3 | – | 0 | Los Angeles Valiant | Burbank, CA |
