= 2018 San Francisco Shock season =

- Head coach: Brad Rajani (rel. May 7); Park Dae-hee
- Owner: Andy Miller
- Division: Pacific

Results
- Record: 17–23 (.425)
- Place: Pacific: 4th; League: 9th
- Stage 1 Playoffs: Did not qualify
- Stage 2 Playoffs: Did not qualify
- Stage 3 Playoffs: Did not qualify
- Stage 4 Playoffs: Did not qualify
- Season Playoffs: Did not qualify
- Total Earnings: $50,000

The 2018 San Francisco Shock season was the first season of the San Francisco Shock's existence in the Overwatch League. The team finished with a regular season record of 17–23 placing them ninth overall. San Francisco did not qualify for any of the Stage Playoffs and did not qualify for the Season Playoffs.

== Preceding offseason ==
On September 28, 2017, NRG Esports announced its official inaugural roster consisting of the following eight players:

- Daniel "dhaK" Martinez Paz
- Dante "Danteh" Cruz
- André "iddqd" Dahlström
- Matthew "super" DeLisi
- Andrej "babybay" Francisty
- Nikola "sleepy" Andrews
- David "Nomy" Lizarraga Ramirez Osmar
- Jay "sinatraa" Won

On the same day, the team announced the hiring of head coach Bradford Rajani. On October 30, Shock signed flex player Andreas "Nevix" Karlsson.

== Review ==
San Francisco Shocks first regular season OWL match was a 0–4 loss against the Los Angeles Valiant on January 10, 2018. The team's first victory came two days later in a 3–1 win over the Shanghai Dragons. The Shock did not find much success in the 2018 Overwatch League season; they finished with a 17–23 record and placed 9th of 12th in the overall league standings.

== Final roster ==
2018 San Francisco Shock roster
Players
Coaches

Role	No.	Handle	Name	Nationality
Damage	2	sinatraa	Won, Jay	United States
Damage	3	Architect	Park Min-ho	South Korea
Damage	6	Danteh	Cruz, Dante	United States
Damage	13	babybay	Francisty, Andrej	United States
Damage	66	iddqd	Dahlström, André	Sweden
Tank	7	nomy	Lizarraga Ramirez Osmar, David	Mexico
Tank	11	ChoiHyoBin	Choi Hyo-bin	South Korea
Support	0	sleepy	Andrews, Nikola	United States
Support	10	dhaK	Martinez Paz, Daniel	Spain
Support	64	Moth	Espe, Grant	United States
Flex	1	super	DeLisi, Matthew	United States
Flex	9	Nevix	Karlsson, Andreas	Sweden

Head coach

- Park Dae-hee

Legend:
- (I) Inactive
- (S) Suspended
- (2W) Two-way player
- Substitute
- (injured) Injury / Illness

Latest roster transaction: April 5, 2018.

=== Transactions ===
Transactions of/for players on the roster during the 2018 regular season:

- On March 13, Shock signed Park "Architect" Min-ho and Grant "Moth" Espe.
- On April 5, Shock signed Choi "Choihyobin" Hyo-bin.

== Standings ==
=== Record by stage ===
Stage	Pld	W	L	Pct	MW	ML	MT	MD	Pos
1	10	3	7	.300	16	24	2	-8	9
2	10	3	7	.300	15	22	1	-7	9
3	10	6	4	.600	21	20	0	+1	5
4	10	5	5	.500	23	16	2	+7	8
Overall	40	17	23	.425	77	84	5	-7	9
Qualified for playoffs

=== League ===
Pos	Div	Team	Pld	W	L	PCT	MW	ML	MT	MD	Qualification
1	ATL	New York Excelsior	40	34	6	0.850	126	43	4	+83	Advance to season playoffs semifinals
2	PAC	Los Angeles Valiant	40	27	13	0.675	100	64	7	+36	Advance to season playoffs semifinals
3	ATL	Boston Uprising	40	26	14	0.650	99	71	3	+28	Advance to season playoffs quarterfinals
4	PAC	Los Angeles Gladiators	40	25	15	0.625	96	72	3	+24	Advance to season playoffs quarterfinals
5	ATL	London Spitfire	40	24	16	0.600	102	69	3	+33	Advance to season playoffs quarterfinals
6	ATL	Philadelphia Fusion	40	24	16	0.600	93	80	2	+13	Advance to season playoffs quarterfinals
7	ATL	Houston Outlaws	40	22	18	0.550	94	77	2	+17	
8	PAC	Seoul Dynasty	40	22	18	0.550	91	78	3	+13	
9	PAC	San Francisco Shock	40	17	23	0.425	77	84	5	−7	
10	PAC	Dallas Fuel	40	12	28	0.300	58	100	7	−42	
11	ATL	Florida Mayhem	40	7	33	0.175	42	120	5	−78	
12	PAC	Shanghai Dragons	40	0	40	0.000	21	141	2	−120	

Source: The Overwatch League
Rules for classification: 1) winning percentage; 2) map differential; 3) head-to-head map differential; 4) head-to-head record

== Game log ==
=== Preseason ===
2018 preseason game log
Preseason (0–3)

1	December 6	Florida Mayhem	1	–	3	San Francisco Shock	Burbank, CA

2	December 6	Los Angeles Valiant	3	–	2	San Francisco Shock	Burbank, CA

3	December 8	San Francisco Shock	0	–	4	London Spitfire	Burbank, CA

=== Regular season ===
2018 game log (Regular season record: 17–23)
Stage 1 (3–7)

1	January 10	San Francisco Shock	0	–	4	Los Angeles Valiant	Burbank, CA

2	January 12	San Francisco Shock	3	–	1	Shanghai Dragons	Burbank, CA

3	January 17	San Francisco Shock	1	–	2	Philadelphia Fusion	Burbank, CA

4	January 20	Boston Uprising	2	–	3	San Francisco Shock	Burbank, CA

5	January 24	San Francisco Shock	1	–	3	London Spitfire	Burbank, CA

6	January 26	Dallas Fuel	3	–	0	San Francisco Shock	Burbank, CA

7	January 31	Houston Outlaws	3	–	1	San Francisco Shock	Burbank, CA

8	February 02	San Francisco Shock	4	–	0	Florida Mayhem	Burbank, CA

9	February 07	San Francisco Shock	1	–	3	Los Angeles Gladiators	Burbank, CA

10	February 09	Seoul Dynasty	3	–	2	San Francisco Shock	Burbank, CA

Stage 2 (3–7)

11	February 21	Los Angeles Gladiators	4	–	0	San Francisco Shock	Burbank, CA

12	February 23	San Francisco Shock	1	–	3	Seoul Dynasty	Burbank, CA

13	February 28	Los Angeles Valiant	3	–	1	San Francisco Shock	Burbank, CA

14	March 03	Shanghai Dragons	0	–	4	San Francisco Shock	Burbank, CA

15	March 07	San Francisco Shock	3	–	0	Dallas Fuel	Burbank, CA

16	March 10	New York Excelsior	4	–	0	San Francisco Shock	Burbank, CA

17	March 16	London Spitfire	3	–	1	San Francisco Shock	Burbank, CA

18	March 17	San Francisco Shock	3	–	1	Houston Outlaws	Burbank, CA

19	March 21	Florida Mayhem	3	–	2	San Francisco Shock	Burbank, CA

20	March 22	San Francisco Shock	2	–	3	Boston Uprising	Burbank, CA

Stage 3 (6–4)

21	April 04	San Francisco Shock	3	–	1	Los Angeles Gladiators	Burbank, CA

22	April 06	Seoul Dynasty	4	–	0	San Francisco Shock	Burbank, CA

23	April 11	San Francisco Shock	0	–	4	Los Angeles Valiant	Burbank, CA

24	April 13	San Francisco Shock	3	–	1	Shanghai Dragons	Burbank, CA

25	April 18	Dallas Fuel	0	–	4	San Francisco Shock	Burbank, CA

26	April 20	Philadelphia Fusion	1	–	3	San Francisco Shock	Burbank, CA

27	April 26	San Francisco Shock	1	–	3	New York Excelsior	Burbank, CA

28	April 28	San Francisco Shock	0	–	4	London Spitfire	Burbank, CA

29	May 02	Houston Outlaws	2	–	3	San Francisco Shock	Burbank, CA

30	May 03	San Francisco Shock	4	–	0	Florida Mayhem	Burbank, CA

Stage 4 (5–5)

31	May 16	Los Angeles Gladiators	3	–	1	San Francisco Shock	Burbank, CA

32	May 18	San Francisco Shock	3	–	1	Seoul Dynasty	Burbank, CA

33	May 24	London Spitfire	3	–	2	San Francisco Shock	Burbank, CA

34	May 25	San Francisco Shock	4	–	0	Houston Outlaws	Burbank, CA

35	May 31	San Francisco Shock	3	–	1	Dallas Fuel	Burbank, CA

36	June 01	Boston Uprising	1	–	3	San Francisco Shock	Burbank, CA

37	June 07	San Francisco Shock	1	–	2	Philadelphia Fusion	Burbank, CA

38	June 09	New York Excelsior	2	–	1	San Francisco Shock	Burbank, CA

39	June 13	Los Angeles Valiant	3	–	1	San Francisco Shock	Burbank, CA

40	June 16	Shanghai Dragons	0	–	4	San Francisco Shock	Burbank, CA
