= Fissure (gamer) =

South Korean professional Overwatch player

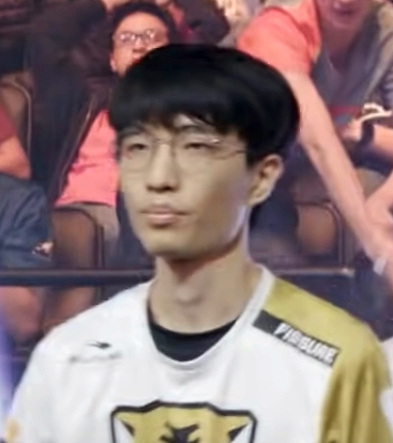
- Baek in 2019

Personal information
- Name: 백찬형 (Baek Chan-hyung)
- Born: 1998 or 1999 (age 27–28)

Career information
- Games: Heroes of the Storm; Overwatch
- Playing career: 2016–2020
- Role: Tank
- Number: 0, 1, 22, 44

Team history
- Heroes of the Storm
- 2016: 1.4
- 2016: Mighty
- Overwatch
- 2017: KongDoo Panthera (Note: Kongdoo Panthera rebranded to Cloud9 Kongdoo after Cloud9 acquired Kongdoo Panthera in late 2017.)
- 2018: London Spitfire
- 2018: Los Angeles Gladiators
- 2019: Seoul Dynasty
- 2020: Vancouver Titans

Career highlights and awards
- OWL All-Star (2018)

Baek Chan-hyung (Korean: 백찬형), better known by Fissure, is a South Korean former professional Overwatch player. During his career, he played in the Overwatch League (OWL) for the London Spitfire, Los Angeles Gladiators, Seoul Dynasty, and Vancouver Titans and in Overwatch Apex for KongDoo Panthera and Cloud9 KongDoo.

A native of South Korea, he began his Overwatch career playing in Overwatch Apex for South Korean team KongDoo Panthera, and shortly after, Cloud9 KongDoo. In 2017, Baek signed with the London Spitfire for the league's inaugural season. After playing for a quarter of the 2018 regular season, he was transferred to the Los Angeles Gladiators; at the end of the season, he was the runner up for the most valuable player award and was named an OWL All-Star. He was transferred to the Seoul Dynasty prior to the start of the 2019 season, and in the middle of the season, he announced his retirement from professional Overwatch. However, he signed with the Vancouver Titans in the offseason preceding the 2020 season. Four games into the season, he was released, along with the entire Titans roster.

Baek played as tank characters in Overwatch, and during his OWL career, he was known as one of the best tank players in the league. However, he continually had internal issues with his teams, leading him to frequently swap to different organizations. He never played a full season for a single OWL organization and was the first player in the OWL to play for four different teams.

== Professional career ==
=== Early career ===
Prior to becoming a professional Overwatch player, Baek was a professional Heroes of the Storm player in 2016, playing under the aliases minepang and Pang. While on a teamed named 1.4, he appeared in multiple premier tournaments and was eventually signed to team Mighty, an esports organization led by Moon Byung-chul, who also eventually transitioned to coaching professional Overwatch. A few months later, Mighty disbanded its Heroes of the Storm division.

On the advice from Moon to pursue a career in Overwatch, Baek joined South Korean team KongDoo Panthera and made his debut in season two of Overwatch Apex. While his performance throughout the season was decent, he made large improvements in his play in season three, leading the team to a second-place finish. In September 2017, prior to the start of the fourth season of Apex, Cloud9 acquired KongDoo Panthera, changing the team's name to Cloud9 KongDoo. In Apex Season 4, they reached the semifinals, where they faced GC Busan. Outplayed by GC Busan's Hong "Gesture" Jae-hui in the match, Baek and KongDoo lost the series, failing to reach the finals.

=== London Spitfire ===
On November 4, 2017, Cloud9 announced its roster for the London Spitfire, a franchised team for the upcoming Overwatch League. Baek was signed to the roster, as it was primarily an amalgamation of Cloud9 KongDoo and GC Busan. Through the first quarter of the 2018 season, known as Stage 1, Baek was often benched in favor of Gesture, as Gesture's chemistry with the team was favored over Baek's aggressive playstyle. In total, he found a total of 77 minutes of play, or just over 12 percent of total playing time, in Stage 1. While the Spitfire went on to Stage 1 finals, Baek did not play in the match. Although technically he had won a stage title, he did not feel that he had won it. "I wasn't the one who earned [the Stage 1 title]", he said. "So I didn't really feel like I had won anything."

=== Los Angeles Gladiators ===
On February 13, 2018, ESPN reported that Baek was transferred to the Los Angeles Gladiators, pending league approval. London head coach Lee "Bishop" Beom-joon said that although the Spitfire "didn't want to lose him," they could not "fit him into the team in terms of synergy." Baek made his debut with the team on February 21, in the first match of Stage 2, against the San Francisco Shock; although he was slightly out of sync with the team, the Gladiators won, 4–0. He led the Gladiators to a 3–1 victory over his former team on March 10. He finished the season accounting for 18.6 percent of his team's final blows, a statistic referring to when a player deals the final amount of damage needed to kill an opposing player, which was the highest rate among all main tank players in the league. He was the runner-up for the league's Most Valuable Player award, only behind Bang "JJonak" Sung-hyeon, and was selected for the 2018 All-Star Game.

Despite his regular season success, Baek was benched in favor of Luis "iRemiix" Galarza Figueroa in the Gladiators' first season playoff series against the Spitfire. Rumors began to circulate that he was benched due to his attitude towards the team in practices and wanting to be on an all-Korean-speaking roster. Baek partially refuted the claims, stating that while he did want to be on an all-Korean-speaking roster, the reason that he was benched was due to iRemiix performing better in game's current meta. He did not play in the playoffs, sitting on the bench as the Gladiators lost their quarterfinals series, 1–2.

=== Seoul Dynasty ===
Baek was transferred to the Seoul Dynasty on August 20, 2018, ahead of the 2019 season; when asked why he chose to go to the Dynasty, he said, "Seoul Dynasty is a Korean team so that's the reason." Throughout the season, the Dynasty consistently shuffled their roster, leading to Baek intermittently not playing in the starting roster. Citing that he was no longer motivated to play, he retired from professional Overwatch on June 27, 2019 and was released from his contract.

Hours after his announced retirement, Baek leaked on his personal stream that the Overwatch League would be implementing an enforced 2-2-2 role lock, a rule in which teams would be required to run a team composition of two damage, two tank, and two support players during every match, in Stage 4 of the season.

=== Vancouver Titans ===
After four months of retirement, Baek returned to the Overwatch League, signing with the Vancouver Titans ahead of the 2020 season. With the signing, he became the first Overwatch League player to have been a part of four different teams. Upon his return, the Overwatch League announced that he was fined US$3,000 for "sharing confidential league information," presumably referring to his role lock leak shortly after his retirement. After a 2–2 start to the season, on May 6, the Titans released their entire roster following ongoing disputes between the organization's management and players.

In June 2020, Baek claimed that, while the rest of the released roster were given buyouts and released as non-restricted free agents, he was "forcibly released" from the team and should have been paid the remainder of his salary. The Overwatch League investigated the matter, clarifying that Baek was the only player that did not agree to a mutual severance with the Titans, and in turn, the Titans terminated his contract for cause.

== Player profile ==
Baek primarily played tank heroes, and he was often described as one of the best main tank players in the Overwatch League. He was known for his aggressive playstyle, often needing to be the focal point of his team to be effective. Baek was most effective when playing as Reinhardt and Winston. Much of his effectiveness on Winston mostly came from his "Primal Rage" ultimate ability usage, an ability in which Winston gains 1,000 hitpoints, causes massive amounts of damage to enemies when Winston melees them, and is able to leap large distances relatively quickly. In 2018, he had the highest kills per Primal Rage usage average and the second highest melee accuracy in the OWL.
