= List of Los Angeles Gladiators players =

The Los Angeles Gladiators are an American esports team founded in 2017 that competes in the Overwatch League (OWL). The Gladiators began playing competitive Overwatch in the 2018 season.

All rostered players during the OWL season (including the playoffs) are included, even if they did not make an appearance.

== All-time roster ==
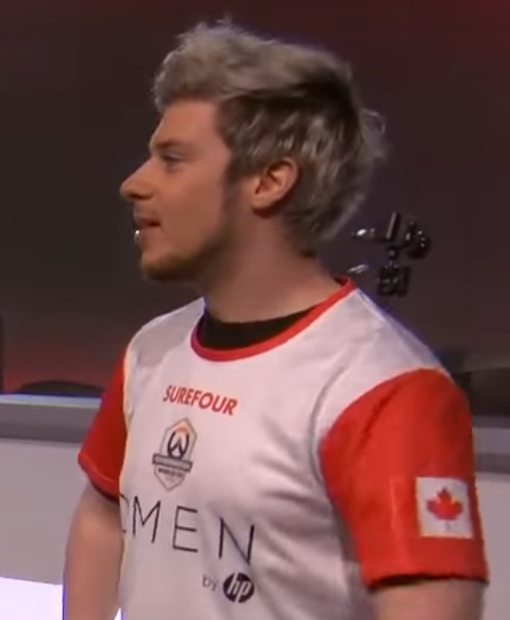
Lane "Surefour" Roberts.

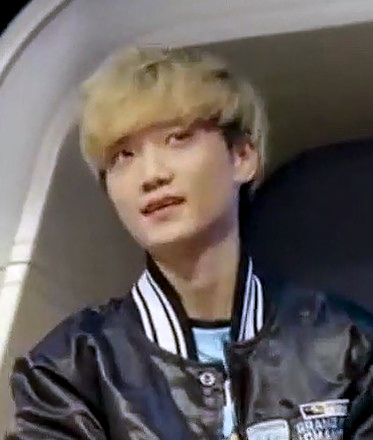
Kim "birdring" Ji-hyeok.

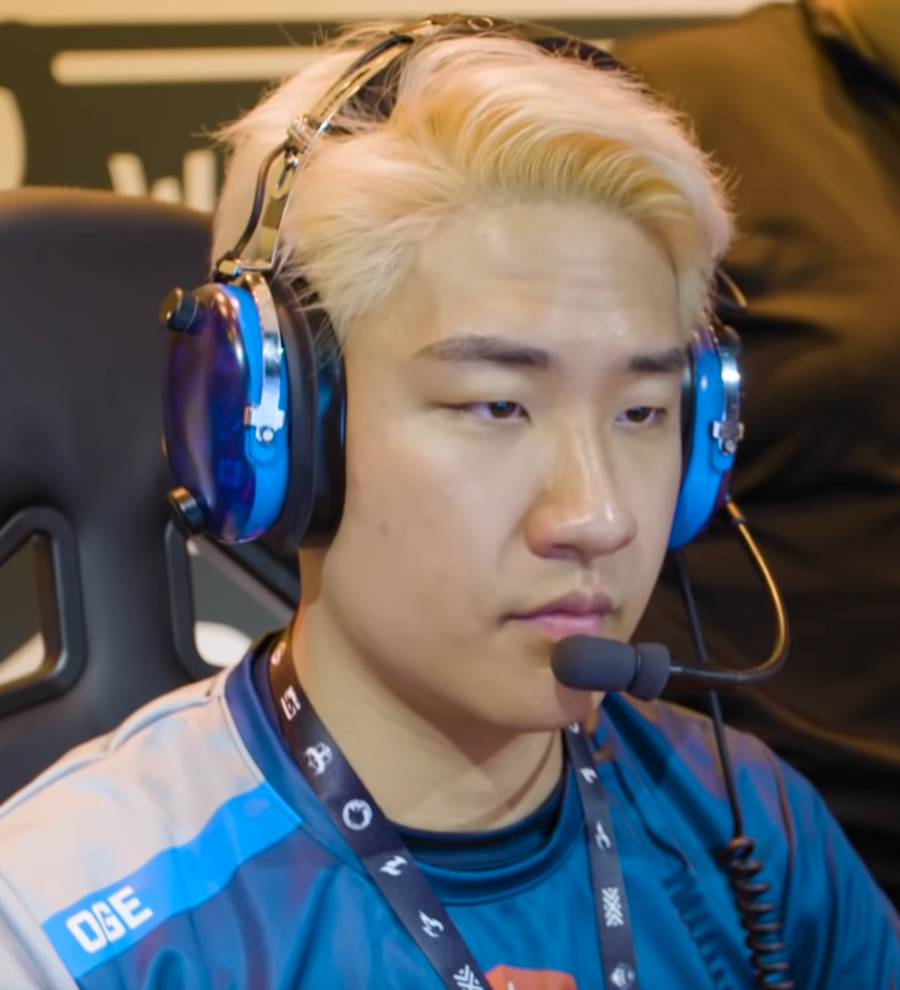
Son "OGE" Min-seok.

As of December 15, 2021

| Handle | Name | Role | Country | Seasons | Ref. |
|---|---|---|---|---|---|
| ANS | Seonchang Lee | Damage | South Korea | 2021–present | |
| Asher | Junsung Choi | Damage | South Korea | 2018 | |
| BigGoose | Benjamin Isohanni | Support | Finland | 2018–2020 | |
| birdring | Jihyeok Kim | Damage | South Korea | 2020–2021 | |
| Bischu | Hyungseok "Aaron" Kim | Tank | South Korea | 2018–2019, 2020 | |
| Decay | Guiun Jang | Damage | South Korea | 2019 | |
| Fissure | Chanhyung Baek | Tank | South Korea | 2018 | |
| FunnyAstro | Daniel Hathaway | Support | Great Britain | 2021–present | |
| Hydration | João Pedro Goes Telles | Damage | United States | 2018–2019 | |
| iRemiix | Luis Galarza Figueroa | Tank | Puerto Rico | 2018 | |
| Jaru | Jason White | Damage | United States | 2020 | |
| kevster | Kevin Persson | Damage | Sweden | 2020–present | |
| LhCloudy | Roni Tiihonen | Tank | Finland | 2020 | |
| MirroR | Chris Trinh | Damage | Vietnam | 2020–2021 | |
| Moth | Grant Espe | Support | United States | 2021 | |
| MuZe | Younghun Kim | Tank | South Korea | 2021 | |
| OGE | Son Min-seok | Tank | South Korea | 2020 | |
| Paintbrush | Nolan Edwards | Support | United States | 2020 | |
| Panker | Byungho Lee | Tank | South Korea | 2019 | |
| Patiphan | Patiphan Chaiwong | Damage | Thailand | 2021–present | |
| Reiner | Corey Scoda | Tank | United States | 2021–present | |
| Ripa | Riku Toivanen | Support | Finland | 2019 | |
| rOar | Chang-hoon Gye | Tank | South Korea | 2019 | |
| Shaz | Jonas Suovaara | Support | Finland | 2018–2020 | |
| Shu | Jinseo Kim | Support | South Korea | 2021–present | |
| Sideshow | Josh Wilkinson | Damage | Great Britain | 2020 | |
| silkthread | Ted Wang | Damage | United States | 2018 | |
| Skewed | Minseok Kim | Support | South Korea | 2021–present | |
| SPACE | Indy Halpern | Tank | United States | 2020–present | |
| Surefour | Lane Roberts | Damage | Canada | 2018–2019 | |
| Void | Junwoo Kang | Tank | South Korea | 2018–2019 | |
