= 2022 Overwatch League season =

- The OWL's fifth season emblem
- League: Overwatch League
- Sport: Overwatch 2
- Duration: May 5 – November 4
- Matches: 24
- Teams: 20
- TV partner: YouTube

Regular season
- Top seed: Dallas Fuel
- Season MVP: Kim "Proper" Dong-hyun

Midseason tournament champions
- Kickoff Clash: Seoul Dynasty (E); Los Angeles Gladiators (W)
- Midseason Madness: Los Angeles Gladiators
- Summer Showdown: Shanghai Dragons (E); Dallas Fuel (W)

Grand Finals
- Venue: Anaheim Convention Center; Anaheim, California
- Champions: Dallas Fuel
- Runners-up: San Francisco Shock
- Finals MVP: Lee "Fearless" Eui-seok

Overwatch League seasons
- ← 2021 2023 →

The 2022 Overwatch League season was the fifth season of the Overwatch League (OWL), a professional esports league. Contrasted to the first four seasons, which was played on the video game Overwatch, the season was played on an early build of Overwatch 2. The regular season began on May 5, 2022, and ended on October 22. The playoffs were played at the Anaheim Convention Center in Anaheim, California, beginning on October 30, and concluded with the Grand Finals on November 4. The Dallas Fuel won the Grand Finals over the San Francisco Shock to win their first OWL championship.

== League format and changes ==
=== Rosters and salaries ===
The 2022 season was being played on an early build of Blizzard's upcoming title Overwatch 2. As such, matches were played with teams of five, rather than teams of six. The minimum number of players on a team was decreased from seven to six, while the maximum number of players remains at twelve. Teams could players to a minimum of one season and could add an option to extend that contract for an additional year, if they so chose. Teams were also allowed to sign players to short-term 30-day contracts and two-way contracts. Additionally, the league's minimum salary was increased from US$50,000 to $50,700.

=== Regions and live events ===
As with the prior two seasons, the twenty teams were divided into two regions, the East and West. Seven teams from China and South Korea competed in the East Region, while thirteen teams from North America and Europe competed in the West Division. While the majority of matches in the 2020 and 2021 seasons were played online, live events returned for the 2022 season.

=== Broadcasting ===
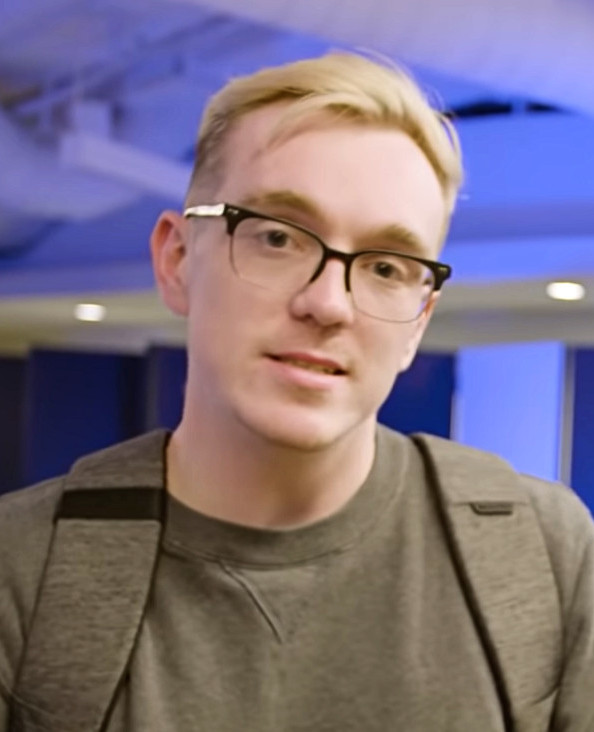
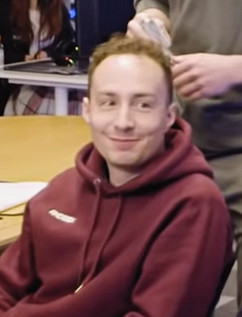
Casters Brennon "Bren" Hook (left) and Josh "Sideshow" Wilkinson (right) left the broadcast team prior to the season.

The League hired Toronto-based production provider Dome Productions to produce and broadcast the 2022 season. The decision to hire a third-party operator left World of Warcraft as Activision Blizzard's only supported esports title that had not been outsourced by March 2022.

In January 2022, shoutcasters Brennon "Bren" Hook and Josh "Sideshow" Wilkinson, who had been with the broadcast team since the league's inaugural season, announced that they did "not have an agreement for 2022 with Overwatch League, marking the end of [their] four years as broadcast talent." In an interview with Dot Esports, the duo noted that the time limit in which negotiations had to take place, as well as the monetary value of the deals, were the main reason for their departure. However, they clarified that they would still be involved with the league via co-streams. The league announced their talent lineup on April 11, 2022, which included neither Hook nor Wilkinson.

On April 20, 2022, the OWL announced that they would be launching a co-streaming initiative, in which select streamers would be able to stream OWL broadcasts simultaneously with their own. It will be the first time that the league has allowed co-streaming, and co-streams are restricted to only be broadcast on YouTube.

== Regular season ==
The regular season began on May 5, 2022. Teams played a total 24 regular season matches, which acted as qualifiers for four standalone tournaments, the Kickoff Clash, Midseason Madness, Summer Showdown and Countdown Cup, which took take place in that order. Each tournament was preceded by six regional qualifying matches. In 2021, all four tournament cycles culminated in an interregional tournament; however, for the 2022 season, the Kickoff Clash and Summer Showdown were regional tournaments, with eight teams qualifying from the West and four teams qualifying in the East, while the Midseason Madness were interregional. The final tournament cycle of the season, the Countdown Cup, did conclude with a tournament.

Similar to the 2021 season, the league used a point system, called League Points, to determine regular season standings. Every win in the regular season earned a team one point. Any team that qualifies for a regional tournament received an additional one point; a first- or second-place finish in a regional midseason tournament instead earned the placing team an additional three or two points, respectively. Any team that qualified for the Midseason Madness tournament received an additional one point; a first-, second-, or third- place finish in the Midseason Madness tournament instead earned the placing team an additional four, three, or two points, respectively.

East region

| Pos | Team | Pld | W | L | PCT | MW | ML | MT | MD | Pts | Qualification |
|---|---|---|---|---|---|---|---|---|---|---|---|
| 1 | Seoul Dynasty | 24 | 19 | 5 | 0.79 | 62 | 24 | 0 | +38 | 25 | Advance to season playoffs |
| 2 | Shanghai Dragons | 24 | 18 | 6 | 0.75 | 57 | 30 | 0 | +27 | 23 | Advance to season playoffs |
| 3 | Philadelphia Fusion | 24 | 11 | 13 | 0.46 | 50 | 50 | 0 | 0 | 15 | Advance to season playoffs |
| 4 | Hangzhou Spark | 24 | 11 | 13 | 0.46 | 46 | 49 | 0 | −3 | 13 | Advance to play-ins |
| 5 | Guangzhou Charge | 24 | 9 | 15 | 0.38 | 34 | 56 | 0 | −22 | 10 | Advance to play-ins |
| 6 | Chengdu Hunters | 24 | 9 | 15 | 0.38 | 39 | 52 | 0 | −13 | 9 | Advance to play-ins |
| 7 | Los Angeles Valiant | 24 | 7 | 17 | 0.29 | 36 | 63 | 0 | −27 | 7 | |

Source: The Overwatch League
Rules for classification: 1) points; 2) winning percentage (including tournaments); 3) regular season wins; 4) regular season map differential

West region

| Pos | Team | Pld | W | L | PCT | MW | ML | MT | MD | Pts | Qualification |
|---|---|---|---|---|---|---|---|---|---|---|---|
| 1 | Dallas Fuel | 24 | 20 | 4 | 0.83 | 61 | 26 | 0 | +35 | 26 | Advance to season playoffs |
| 2 | San Francisco Shock | 24 | 20 | 4 | 0.83 | 65 | 27 | 0 | +38 | 26 | Advance to season playoffs |
| 3 | Los Angeles Gladiators | 24 | 18 | 6 | 0.75 | 64 | 29 | 0 | +35 | 25 | Advance to season playoffs |
| 4 | Houston Outlaws | 24 | 16 | 8 | 0.67 | 56 | 42 | 0 | +14 | 19 | Advance to season playoffs |
| 5 | Atlanta Reign | 24 | 13 | 11 | 0.54 | 51 | 42 | 0 | +9 | 16 | Advance to season playoffs |
| 6 | London Spitfire | 24 | 14 | 10 | 0.58 | 50 | 41 | 0 | +9 | 16 | Advance to season playoffs |
| 7 | Florida Mayhem | 24 | 12 | 12 | 0.50 | 46 | 45 | 0 | +1 | 15 | Advance to play-ins |
| 8 | Toronto Defiant | 24 | 12 | 12 | 0.50 | 48 | 49 | 0 | −1 | 15 | Advance to play-ins |
| 9 | Washington Justice | 24 | 11 | 13 | 0.46 | 47 | 51 | 0 | −4 | 13 | Advance to play-ins |
| 10 | Boston Uprising | 24 | 10 | 14 | 0.42 | 43 | 52 | 0 | −9 | 10 | Advance to play-ins |
| 11 | Vancouver Titans | 24 | 5 | 19 | 0.21 | 29 | 62 | 0 | −33 | 6 | |
| 12 | New York Excelsior | 24 | 4 | 20 | 0.17 | 28 | 66 | 0 | −38 | 4 | |
| 13 | Paris Eternal | 24 | 1 | 23 | 0.04 | 15 | 71 | 0 | −56 | 1 | |

Source: The Overwatch League
Rules for classification: 1) points; 2) winning percentage (including tournaments); 3) regular season wins; 4) regular season map differential

=== Kickoff Clash ===
The Kickoff Clash is the first of four midseason tournament cycles of the season. Qualifiers began on May 5 in the West region, while the East region qualifiers were delayed until May 20 due to increasing COVID-19 concerns in China. Teams that advance past the qualifiers will play in their respective regional tournaments, which will take place from June 2 to 5. The West region tournament will take place live at Esports Stadium Arlington.

==== Qualifiers ====
East region

| Pos | Team | Pld | W | L | PCT | MW | ML | MT | MD | Qualification |
|---|---|---|---|---|---|---|---|---|---|---|
| 1 | Hangzhou Spark | 6 | 5 | 1 | 0.83 | 17 | 9 | 0 | +8 | Advance to regional tournament |
| 2 | Shanghai Dragons | 6 | 5 | 1 | 0.83 | 15 | 11 | 0 | +4 | Advance to regional tournament |
| 3 | Seoul Dynasty | 6 | 4 | 2 | 0.67 | 14 | 8 | 0 | +6 | Advance to regional tournament |
| 4 | Philadelphia Fusion | 6 | 3 | 3 | 0.50 | 12 | 10 | 0 | +2 | Advance to regional tournament |
| 5 | Chengdu Hunters | 6 | 2 | 4 | 0.33 | 9 | 13 | 0 | −4 | |
| 6 | Los Angeles Valiant | 6 | 1 | 5 | 0.17 | 11 | 16 | 0 | −5 | |
| 7 | Guangzhou Charge | 6 | 1 | 5 | 0.17 | 5 | 16 | 0 | −11 | |

Source: The Overwatch League
Rules for classification: 1) winning percentage; 2) map differential; 3) head-to-head record; 4) head-to-head map differential

West region

| Pos | Team | Pld | W | L | PCT | MW | ML | MT | MD | Qualification |
|---|---|---|---|---|---|---|---|---|---|---|
| 1 | San Francisco Shock | 6 | 6 | 0 | 1.00 | 18 | 5 | 0 | +13 | Advance to regional tournament |
| 2 | Dallas Fuel | 6 | 5 | 1 | 0.83 | 15 | 5 | 0 | +10 | Advance to regional tournament |
| 3 | Los Angeles Gladiators | 6 | 4 | 2 | 0.67 | 16 | 9 | 0 | +7 | Advance to regional tournament |
| 4 | Florida Mayhem | 6 | 4 | 2 | 0.67 | 15 | 8 | 0 | +7 | Advance to regional tournament |
| 5 | Houston Outlaws | 6 | 4 | 2 | 0.67 | 15 | 10 | 0 | +5 | Advance to regional tournament |
| 6 | Toronto Defiant | 6 | 4 | 2 | 0.67 | 13 | 10 | 0 | +3 | Advance to regional tournament |
| 7 | Atlanta Reign | 6 | 3 | 3 | 0.50 | 11 | 10 | 0 | +1 | Advance to regional tournament |
| 8 | Washington Justice | 6 | 3 | 3 | 0.50 | 11 | 11 | 0 | 0 | Advance to regional tournament |
| 9 | London Spitfire | 6 | 3 | 3 | 0.50 | 10 | 12 | 0 | −2 | |
| 10 | Boston Uprising | 6 | 2 | 4 | 0.33 | 9 | 15 | 0 | −6 | |
| 11 | New York Excelsior | 6 | 1 | 5 | 0.17 | 6 | 16 | 0 | −10 | |
| 12 | Paris Eternal | 6 | 0 | 6 | 0.00 | 4 | 18 | 0 | −14 | |
| 13 | Vancouver Titans | 6 | 0 | 6 | 0.00 | 4 | 18 | 0 | −14 | |

Source: The Overwatch League
Rules for classification: 1) winning percentage; 2) map differential; 3) head-to-head record; 4) head-to-head map differential

==== Tournaments ====
East region

Upper round 1
1 | Hangzhou | 1
4 | Philadelphia | 3
2 | Shanghai | 3
3 | Seoul | 2
Lower round 1
1 | Hangzhou | 0
3 | Seoul | 3

Upper final
4 | Philadelphia | 3
2 | Shanghai | 0
Lower final
2 | Shanghai | 2
3 | Seoul | 3

Final
4 | Philadelphia | 0
3 | Seoul | 4

West region

Upper round 1 | Upper round 2 | Upper final | Final
1 | San Francisco | 3
8 | Washington | 2
1 | San Francisco | 1
7 | Atlanta | 3
4 | Florida | 1
7 | Atlanta | 3
7 | Atlanta | 0
3 | LA Gladiators | 3
2 | Dallas | 3
6 | Toronto | 0
2 | Dallas | 1
3 | LA Gladiators | 3
3 | LA Gladiators | 3
5 | Houston | 0 | 3 | LA Gladiators | 4
2 | Dallas | 0
Lower round 1 | Lower round 2 | Lower round 3 | Lower final
2 | Dallas | 3
8 | Washington | 1 | 4 | Florida | 1 | 7 | Atlanta | 1
4 | Florida | 3 | 2 | Dallas | 3 | 2 | Dallas | 3
1 | San Francisco | 0
1 | San Francisco | 3
6 | Toronto | 1 | 5 | Houston | 1
5 | Houston | 3

=== Midseason Madness ===
The Midseason Madness is the second of four midseason tournament cycles of the season. Qualifiers began on June 16 in the West region and June 24 in the East region. Qualification for the Midseason Madness was based on league points earned through the entire first half the season. Teams that advanced past the qualifiers played in an interregional tournament. Like in the previous season, the top Western teams travelled to Hawaii for the interregional tournament to minimize latency, while the top Eastern teams stayed in their home facilities. The 12-team, double-elimination tournament began on July 18 and concluded with the finals on July 23.

==== Qualifiers ====
East region

| Pos | Team | Pld | W | L | PCT | MW | ML | MT | MD | Pts | Qualification |
|---|---|---|---|---|---|---|---|---|---|---|---|
| 1 | Seoul Dynasty | 12 | 9 | 3 | 0.75 | 30 | 13 | 0 | +17 | 12 | Advance to tournament |
| 2 | Hangzhou Spark | 12 | 9 | 3 | 0.75 | 31 | 16 | 0 | +15 | 10 | Advance to tournament |
| 3 | Shanghai Dragons | 12 | 9 | 3 | 0.75 | 27 | 18 | 0 | +9 | 10 | Advance to tournament |
| 4 | Philadelphia Fusion | 12 | 6 | 6 | 0.50 | 24 | 23 | 0 | +1 | 8 | Advance to tournament |
| 5 | Chengdu Hunters | 12 | 5 | 7 | 0.42 | 21 | 24 | 0 | −3 | 5 | |
| 6 | Los Angeles Valiant | 12 | 3 | 9 | 0.25 | 18 | 31 | 0 | −13 | 3 | |
| 7 | Guangzhou Charge | 12 | 1 | 11 | 0.08 | 8 | 34 | 0 | −26 | 1 | |

Source: The Overwatch League
Rules for classification: 1) points; 2) winning percentage (including tournaments); 3) regular season wins; 4) regular season map differential

West region

| Pos | Team | Pld | W | L | PCT | MW | ML | MT | MD | Pts | Qualification |
|---|---|---|---|---|---|---|---|---|---|---|---|
| 1 | San Francisco Shock | 12 | 12 | 0 | 1.00 | 36 | 8 | 0 | +28 | 13 | Advance to tournament |
| 2 | Los Angeles Gladiators | 12 | 10 | 2 | 0.83 | 34 | 12 | 0 | +22 | 13 | Advance to tournament |
| 3 | Dallas Fuel | 12 | 9 | 3 | 0.75 | 27 | 14 | 0 | +13 | 11 | Advance to tournament |
| 4 | Houston Outlaws | 12 | 9 | 3 | 0.75 | 30 | 21 | 0 | +9 | 10 | Advance to tournament |
| 5 | London Spitfire | 12 | 8 | 4 | 0.67 | 26 | 20 | 0 | +6 | 8 | Advance to tournament |
| 6 | Atlanta Reign | 12 | 7 | 5 | 0.58 | 26 | 19 | 0 | +7 | 8 | Advance to tournament |
| 7 | Florida Mayhem | 12 | 6 | 6 | 0.50 | 24 | 23 | 0 | +1 | 7 | Advance to tournament |
| 8 | Toronto Defiant | 12 | 6 | 6 | 0.50 | 23 | 25 | 0 | −2 | 7 | Advance to tournament |
| 9 | Washington Justice | 12 | 5 | 7 | 0.42 | 23 | 26 | 0 | −3 | 6 | |
| 10 | Boston Uprising | 12 | 4 | 8 | 0.33 | 21 | 28 | 0 | −7 | 4 | |
| 11 | New York Excelsior | 12 | 1 | 11 | 0.08 | 14 | 34 | 0 | −20 | 1 | |
| 12 | Paris Eternal | 12 | 1 | 11 | 0.08 | 10 | 35 | 0 | −25 | 1 | |
| 13 | Vancouver Titans | 12 | 0 | 12 | 0.00 | 7 | 36 | 0 | −29 | 0 | |

Source: The Overwatch League
Rules for classification: 1) points; 2) winning percentage (including tournaments); 3) regular season wins; 4) regular season map differential

==== Tournament ====
Upper round 1 July 18 | Upper round 2 July 19 | Upper round 3 July 21 | Upper final July 22 | Final; July 23
1 | San Francisco | 3
8 | London | 3 | 8 | London | 1
1 | San Francisco | 3
9 | Atlanta | 1
7 | Shanghai | 0
4 | Dallas | 0
7 | Shanghai | 3 | 7 | Shanghai | 3
1 | San Francisco | 3
12 | Toronto | 0
2 | LA Gladiators | 2
2 | LA Gladiators | 3
5 | Hangzhou | 3 | 6 | Houston | 0
2 | LA Gladiators | 3
10 | Philadelphia | 1
5 | Hangzhou | 2
3 | Seoul | 0
6 | Houston | 3 | 5 | Hangzhou | 3
11 | Florida | 0 | 1 | San Francisco | 2
2 | LA Gladiators | 4
Lower round 1 July 20 | Lower round 2 July 21 | Lower round 3 July 22 | Lower round 4 July 22 | Lower final July 23
8 | London | 2
11 | Hangzhou | 2
11 | Florida | 3
11 | Florida | 2 | 10 | Philadelphia | 3
10 | Philadelphia | 3 | 2 | LA Gladiators | 3
4 | Dallas | 1
10 | Philadelphia | 1 | 9 | Atlanta | 1
10 | Philadelphia | 3
9 | Atlanta | 3
6 | Houston | 3
7 | Shanghai | 1
12 | Toronto | 2
6 | Houston | 1 | 9 | Atlanta | 3
9 | Atlanta | 3
3 | Seoul | 2
9 | Atlanta | 3

=== Summer Showdown ===
The Summer Showdown was the third midseason tournament cycle of the season.

==== Qualifiers ====
East region

| Pos | Team | Pld | W | L | PCT | MW | ML | MT | MD | Qualification |
|---|---|---|---|---|---|---|---|---|---|---|
| 1 | Shanghai Dragons | 6 | 6 | 0 | 1.00 | 18 | 1 | 0 | +17 | Advance to regional tournament |
| 2 | Seoul Dynasty | 6 | 5 | 1 | 0.83 | 15 | 5 | 0 | +10 | Advance to regional tournament |
| 3 | Guangzhou Charge | 6 | 4 | 2 | 0.67 | 12 | 11 | 0 | +1 | Advance to regional tournament |
| 4 | Philadelphia Fusion | 6 | 2 | 4 | 0.33 | 11 | 15 | 0 | −4 | Advance to regional tournament |
| 5 | Chengdu Hunters | 6 | 2 | 4 | 0.33 | 8 | 13 | 0 | −5 | |
| 6 | Los Angeles Valiant | 6 | 1 | 5 | 0.17 | 8 | 17 | 0 | −9 | |
| 7 | Hangzhou Spark | 6 | 1 | 5 | 0.17 | 6 | 16 | 0 | −10 | |

Source: The Overwatch League
Rules for classification: 1) winning percentage; 2) map differential; 3) head-to-head record; 4) head-to-head map differential

West region

| Pos | Team | Pld | W | L | PCT | MW | ML | MT | MD | Qualification |
|---|---|---|---|---|---|---|---|---|---|---|
| 1 | Dallas Fuel | 6 | 6 | 0 | 1.00 | 18 | 7 | 0 | +11 | Advance to regional tournament |
| 2 | San Francisco Shock | 6 | 5 | 1 | 0.83 | 16 | 6 | 0 | +10 | Advance to regional tournament |
| 3 | Houston Outlaws | 6 | 4 | 2 | 0.67 | 14 | 10 | 0 | +4 | Advance to regional tournament |
| 4 | Toronto Defiant | 6 | 4 | 2 | 0.67 | 14 | 10 | 0 | +4 | Advance to regional tournament |
| 5 | London Spitfire | 6 | 3 | 3 | 0.50 | 13 | 10 | 0 | +3 | Advance to regional tournament |
| 6 | Vancouver Titans | 6 | 3 | 3 | 0.50 | 13 | 11 | 0 | +2 | Advance to regional tournament |
| 7 | Washington Justice | 6 | 3 | 3 | 0.50 | 13 | 11 | 0 | +2 | Advance to regional tournament |
| 8 | Florida Mayhem | 6 | 3 | 3 | 0.50 | 10 | 10 | 0 | 0 | Advance to regional tournament |
| 9 | Los Angeles Gladiators | 6 | 2 | 4 | 0.33 | 12 | 12 | 0 | 0 | |
| 10 | Atlanta Reign | 6 | 2 | 4 | 0.33 | 10 | 13 | 0 | −3 | |
| 11 | Boston Uprising | 6 | 2 | 4 | 0.33 | 7 | 15 | 0 | −8 | |
| 12 | New York Excelsior | 6 | 2 | 4 | 0.33 | 7 | 15 | 0 | −8 | |
| 13 | Paris Eternal | 6 | 0 | 6 | 0.00 | 1 | 18 | 0 | −17 | |

Source: The Overwatch League
Rules for classification: 1) winning percentage; 2) map differential; 3) head-to-head record; 4) head-to-head map differential

==== Tournaments ====
East region

Upper round 1
1 | Shanghai | 3
3 | Guangzhou | 0
2 | Seoul | 3
4 | Philadelphia | 2
Lower round 1
3 | Guangzhou | 0
4 | Philadelphia | 3

Upper final
1 | Shanghai | 3
2 | Seoul | 0
Lower final
2 | Seoul | 3
4 | Philadelphia | 1

Final
1 | Shanghai | 4
2 | Seoul | 2

West region

Upper round 1 | Upper round 2 | Upper final | Final
1 | Dallas | 3
7 | Washington | 2
1 | Dallas | 3
5 | London | 1
4 | Toronto | 1
5 | London | 3
1 | Dallas | 3
2 | San Francisco | 0
2 | San Francisco | 3
6 | Vancouver | 1
2 | San Francisco | 3
3 | Houston | 1
3 | Houston | 3
8 | Florida | 0 | 1 | Dallas | 4
2 | San Francisco | 0
Lower round 1 | Lower round 2 | Lower round 3 | Lower final
3 | Houston | 0
7 | Washington | 1 | 4 | Toronto | 3 | 2 | San Francisco | 3
4 | Toronto | 3 | 4 | Toronto | 3 | 4 | Toronto | 1
8 | Florida | 2
5 | London | 2
8 | Florida | 3 | 8 | Florida | 3
6 | Vancouver | 0

== Postseason ==
=== Play-in tournaments ===
The play-in tournaments were two regional tournaments that took place following the Countdown Cup tournament cycle. The Eastern region play-in tournament saw seeds four through six play in a single-elimination tournament on October 15, with the winner advancing to the season playoffs. In the Western region, seeds seven through ten played in a double-elimination tournament from October 21 to 22, with the top two teams advancing to the season playoffs. All matches were determined by which team wins three maps.

==== Brackets ====
East region

Semifinal
5 | Guangzhou | 2
6 | Chengdu | 3

Final
4 | Hangzhou | 3
6 | Chengdu | 0

West region

Upper round 1
7 | Florida | 3
10 | Boston | 0
8 | Toronto | 3
9 | Washington | 0
Lower round 1
10 | Boston | 3
9 | Washington | 0

Upper final
7 | Florida | 3
8 | Toronto | 1
Lower final
8 | Toronto | 3
10 | Boston | 0

=== Playoffs ===
A total of twelve teams advanced to the season playoffs. The top six teams from the West and the top three teams from the East, based on the regular season standings, advanced directly to the season playoffs. The play-ins qualified an additional one team from the East and two teams from the West. The entirety of the season playoffs took place at the Anaheim Convention Center in Anaheim, California, beginning on October 31, and concluded with the Grand Finals on November 4.

==== Bracket ====
Upper round 1 October 30 | Upper round 2 October 31 | Upper round 3 November 2 | Upper final November 3 | Grand Finals; November 4
1 | Dallas Fuel | 3
8 | London Spitfire | 3 | 12 | Hangzhou Spark | 1
1 | Dallas Fuel | 3
9 | Philadelphia Fusion | 0
4 | Seoul Dynasty | 0
4 | Seoul Dynasty | 3
5 | Shanghai Dragons | 0 | 10 | Florida Mayhem | 0
1 | Dallas Fuel | 3
12 | Hangzhou Spark | 3
6 | Houston Outlaws | 1
2 | San Francisco Shock | 2
7 | Atlanta Reign | 0 | 6 | Houston Outlaws | 3
6 | Houston Outlaws | 3
10 | Florida Mayhem | 3
8 | London Spitfire | 0
3 | Los Angeles Gladiators | 1
6 | Houston Outlaws | 3 | 8 | London Spitfire | 3
11 | Toronto Defiant | 0 | 1 | Dallas Fuel | 4
2 | San Francisco Shock | 3
Lower round 1 November 1 | Lower round 2 November 2 | Lower round 3 November 3 | Lower round 4 November 3 | Lower final November 4
3 | Los Angeles Gladiators | 3
4 | Seoul Dynasty | 0
9 | Philadelphia Fusion | 1
3 | Los Angeles Gladiators | 1 | 2 | San Francisco Shock | 3
2 | San Francisco Shock | 3 | 6 | Houston Outlaws | 0
2 | San Francisco Shock | 3
2 | San Francisco Shock | 3 | 2 | San Francisco Shock | 3
5 | Shanghai Dragons | 1
12 | Hangzhou Spark | 1
10 | Florida Mayhem | 3
8 | London Spitfire | 1
7 | Atlanta Reign | 1
10 | Florida Mayhem | 1 | 12 | Hangzhou Spark | 3
12 | Hangzhou Spark | 3
12 | Hangzhou Spark | 3
11 | Toronto Defiant | 2

== Awards ==
=== Individual awards ===
| Award | Recipient |
|---|---|
| Most Valuable Player | Kim "Proper" Dong-hyun (San Francisco Shock) |
| Dennis Hawelka Award | Hadi "Hadi" Bleinagel (London Spitfire) |
| Alarm Rookie of the Year | Kim "Proper" Dong-hyun (San Francisco Shock) |
| Coach of the Year | Christopher "Christfer" Graham (London Spitfire) |
| Grand Finals MVP | Lee "Fearless" Eui-seok (Dallas Fuel) |

=== Role Stars ===
| Damage | Tank | Support |
|---|---|---|
| Kevin "Kevster" Persson (Los Angeles Gladiators) | Hadi "Hadi" Bleinagel (London Spitfire) | Han "Chiyo" Hyeon-seok (Dallas Fuel) |
| Lee "Lip" Jae-wan (Shanghai Dragons) | Choi "Hanbin" Han-been (Dallas Fuel) | Kwon "Fielder" Jun (Dallas Fuel) |
| Park "Profit" Jun-young (Seoul Dynasty) | Corey "Reiner" Scoda (Los Angeles Gladiators) | Kim "Izayaki" Min-chul (Shanghai Dragons) |
| Kim "Proper" Dong-hyun (San Francisco Shock) | Yoo "Smurf" Myeong-hwan (Seoul Dynasty) | Kim "Shu" Jin-seo (Los Angeles Gladiators) |

== Prize pool ==
Teams in the 2022 season competed for a prize pool across midseason tournaments and playoffs, with the payout division detailed below. The Midseason Madness and season playoffs had a prize pool of over US$1 million.

| Team | Kickoff Clash | Midseason Madness | Summer Showdown | Season playoffs | Total |
|---|---|---|---|---|---|
| Atlanta Reign | $40,000 | $125,000 | – | $35,000 | $200,000 |
| Boston Uprising | – | – | – | – | $0 |
| Chengdu Hunters | – | – | – | – | $0 |
| Dallas Fuel | $50,000 | – | $75,000 | $1,000,000 | $1,125,000 |
| Florida Mayhem | $15,000 | – | $30,000 | $55,000 | $100,000 |
| Guangzhou Charge | – | – | – | – | $0 |
| Hangzhou Spark | – | $25,000 | – | $250,000 | $275,000 |
| Houston Outlaws | $15,000 | – | $15,000 | $350,000 | $380,000 |
| London Spitfire | – | – | $15,000 | $100,000 | $115,000 |
| Los Angeles Gladiators | $75,000 | $500,000 | – | $55,000 | $630,000 |
| Los Angeles Valiant | – | – | – | – | $0 |
| New York Excelsior | – | – | – | – | $0 |
| Paris Eternal | – | – | – | – | $0 |
| Philadelphia Fusion | $35,000 | $75,000 | $20,000 | $35,000 | $165,000 |
| San Francisco Shock | $30,000 | $250,000 | $50,000 | $500,000 | $830,000 |
| Seoul Dynasty | $50,000 | – | $35,000 | $100,000 | $185,000 |
| Shanghai Dragons | $20,000 | $25,000 | $50,000 | $35,000 | $130,000 |
| Toronto Defiant | – | – | $40,000 | – | $40,000 |
| Vancouver Titans | – | – | – | $35,000 | $35,000 |
| Washington Justice | – | – | – | – | $0 |
| Total | $330,000 | $1,000,000 | $330,000 | $2,550,000 | $4,210,000 |
