= Fearless (gamer) =

South Korean professional Overwatch player

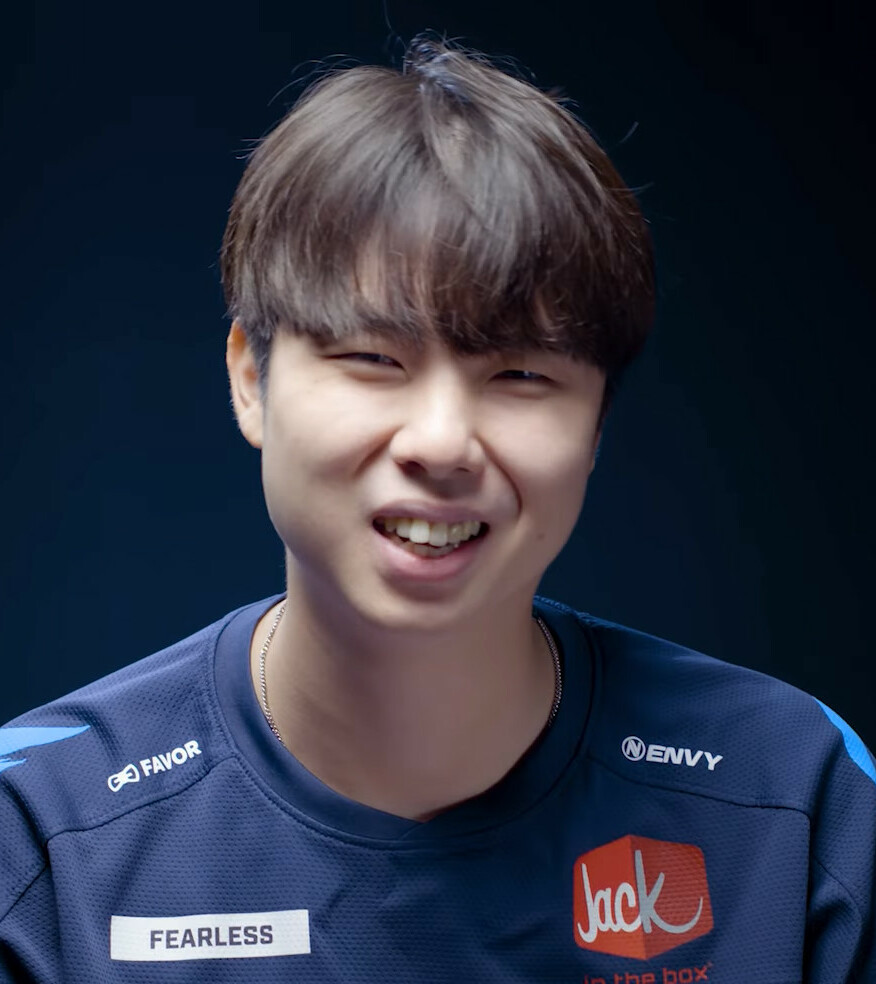
- Lee in 2022

Personal information
- Name: 이의석 (Lee Eui-seok)
- Born: 1998 or 1999 (age 27–28)
- Nationality: South Korean

Career information
- Game: Overwatch
- Playing career: 2017–2023
- Role: Tank

Team history
- 2017–2018: Element Mystic
- 2018–2019: Shanghai Dragons
- 2019–2020: Team CC
- 2020: Shanghai Dragons
- 2021–2022: Dallas Fuel
- 2023: Houston Outlaws

Career highlights and awards
- OWL Champion (2022); OWL Grand Finals MVP (2022); 3× Role Star (2020, 2021, 2023); OWL All-Star (2020)

Lee Eui-seok (Korean: 이의석), also known as Fearless, is a South Korean former professional Overwatch tank player. He began his Overwatch career playing for South Korean team Element Mystic in Korean Overwatch Contenders. Lee signed with the Shanghai Dragons of the Overwatch League's (OWL) inaugural season but did not win a single match in his time there. After being sent to Team CC in Overwatch Contenders in 2019, he rejoined the Dragons for the 2020 season, where he won two midseason tournaments. Lee signed with the Dallas Fuel for the 2021 season, where he picked up his third midseason tournament title. In the 2022 season, he won the Overwatch League Grand Finals and was named the Grand Finals MVP. He was signed by the Houston Outlaws for the 2023 season and once again reached the Grand Finals but ultimately finished in second place. Fearless was released from the Outlaws later that year, and in February 2024, he announced his retirement.

== Professional career ==
=== Early career ===
Lee was the team captain for South Korean team Element Mystic and played with the team from 2017 to 2018.

=== Shanghai Dragons ===
In February 2018, Lee, along with Kim "Geguri" Se-yeon, signed with the Shanghai Dragons of the Overwatch League after they began their season with an 0–8 record. However, due to travel visa issues, Lee was not able to join the team, who were competing in the United States, until the beginning of the second half of the season. After he joined the team, he took the starting position over Jing "Roshan" Wenhao. He and Geguri were the starting tanks for the team; as Koreans, there was a visible communication issue with them and the Chinese players on their team who spoke Mandarin. He did not win a game with the team, as they went 0–40 on the season. Lee returned home to South Korea due to health issues, and did not join the team for the start of the 2019 season.

In April 2019, still having not played with the team, he was transferred to Team CC, the Dragons' academy team in Overwatch Contenders. After Team CC had two successful seasons, Lee was promoted back to the Dragons prior to the start of the 2020 season.

He was a starter throughout the season and won two of the season's midseason tournaments, the May Melee and Countdown Cup. At the end of the 2020 regular season, Lee was awarded with a Role Star commendation in the tank role and selected as a 2020 All-Star.

=== Dallas Fuel ===
On November 7, 2020, ahead of the 2021 season, Lee was transferred to the Dallas Fuel. Lee defeated his former team, the Dragons, in the May Melee finals, to claim his third career midseason tournament title. At the end of the season, he was named a Role Star for the second time in his career.

The 2022 season saw the OWL switch from playing Overwatch to Overwatch 2, where matches were played with teams of five, instead of teams of six. With the removal of one tank from the lineup, Lee split his playing time with Choi "Hanbin" Han-been. Lee saw reduced playing time throughout the regular season, as his team went on to win the Summer Showdown with Hanbin as the starter. However, he reentered the starting lineup for the playoffs. He and the team reached the 2022 Grand Finals, where they defeated the San Francisco Shock, 4–3; Lee was named the Grand Finals most valuable player.

=== Houston Outlaws ===
After the 2022 season, Lee signed to the Houston Outlaws. At the end of the 2023 season, he was named a Role Star for the third time in his career. The Outlaws reached the 2023 Overwatch League Grand Finals, where they faced the Florida Mayhem. Bernar started the match at the Outlaws' tank, but after trailing the match 0–3, Fearless was subbed into the match. However, the Outlaws lost the fourth map as well, and finished the season in second place. On October 9, 2023, the Fearless, along with the entirety of the Outlaws' roster, was released.

On February 22, 2024, Fearless announced his retirement in order to complete his mandatory military service.

== Personal life ==
Lee attended college in 2017.

In 2021, Lee spoke out against racism during the COVID-19 pandemic that he and his teammates had experienced while in the United States. During a live-stream on Twitch, he recounted how people on the street would, among other things, approach him and "pretend to fucking cough". Lee also explained how he would wear his team jersey in an effort to detract people from harassing him. The segment was taken, translated, and posted to Twitter by Florida Mayhem manager Jade Kim on April 6, 2021. After one day, the post gained over 300,000 views. Several individuals and organizations released statements in response to post, including Activision Blizzard, Envy Gaming owner Mike Rufail, and Andbox.

Awards and achievements
Preceded by Lee "LIP" Jae-won	OWL Grand Finals MVP; 2022	Succeeded by Incumbent
