= Fusion Arena =

Canceled esports arena in south Philadelphia, Pennsylvania

- Location in Philadelphia Location in Pennsylvania Location in the United States
- Location: Philadelphia, Pennsylvania
- Coordinates: 39°54′13.0″N 75°10′59.6″W
- Owner: Comcast Spectacor
- Capacity: 3,500 (planned)
- Type: Multi-purpose arena

Construction
- Groundbreaking: September 25, 2019
- Cost: $50 million (estimated)
- Architect: Populous
- Project manager: The Cordish Companies

Tenant
- Philadelphia Fusion (OWL)

Website
- Official website
- Building details

General information
- Status: Never built
- Estimated completion: 2021 (planned)

Fusion Arena was a planned multi-use facility located in Philadelphia, Pennsylvania. Announced on March 25, 2019, the original plan for the venue was to be a dedicated esports arena as the home to the Philadelphia Fusion of the Overwatch League (OWL) within the South Philadelphia Sports Complex. It was originally planned to open prior to the 2021 OWL season.

After construction was delayed due to the COVID-19 pandemic, Comcast Spectacor, the arena's owner, shifted the arena's plan to a multi-use arena. In 2023, the Fusion relocated to Seoul, South Korea and became the Seoul Infernal; Comcast Spectacor later confirmed that the arena would no longer be built.

== History ==
On December 12, 2018, the Overwatch League (OWL), an esports league based on Blizzard Entertainment's 2016 first-person shooter Overwatch, announced the addition of "Homestand Weeks," weeks of games played in cities other than Burbank, California, where all 2018 OWL games were played, for their second season as an effort to push the league towards a full home-and-away schedule. On March 15, 2019, then-OWL commissioner Nate Nanzer tweeted that all teams would have home venues for the 2020 season. On March 25, Comcast Spectacor announced plans to build Fusion Arena, the "largest new-construction, purpose-built esports arena in the Western Hemisphere," adjacent to Xfinity Live!. Fusion Arena was subsequently added to Comcast's $250 million "Transformation 2020" project, a project to renovate the South Philadelphia Sports Complex, which includes Xfinity Live!, Lincoln Financial Field, Wells Fargo Center, Citizens Bank Park, and the surrounding area.

A groundbreaking ceremony was held on September 25, days before the 2019 Overwatch League Grand Finals took place at the Wells Fargo Center. OWL commissioner Pete Vlastelica, Philadelphia mayor Jim Kenney, Fusion players and representatives of Comcast Spectacor participated in the ceremony.

On September 21, 2020, Comcast Spectacor announced a pause in construction caused by the COVID-19 pandemic and that the opening of the arena would likely be delayed. In June 2022, Philadelphia Business Journal reported that Comcast Spectacor changed its plans from having it be a dedicated esports arena into a multi-use facility.

On December 30, 2022, Comcast Spectacor announced that the Fusion would be relocated to Seoul, South Korea, ahead of the 2023 Overwatch League season and rebranding as the Seoul Infernal. A company spokesperson later confirmed that Fusion Arena would not be built and would be replaced by a smaller multipurpose venue.

In February 2024, the South Philadelphia Sports Complex announced its revised renovation plans, with the Fusion Arena being replaced by a 5,000 square feet (460 m^{2}), 5,000 seat concert venue.

=== Planning and design ===
Conceptual images for Fusion Arena were released on March 25, 2019. The 60,000-square-foot (5,600 m^{2}) arena would have been built on 47 acres (19 ha) next to Xfinity Live! on 11th Street in the South Philadelphia Sports Complex. The arena would have been constructed by Populous. The arena would have had two balcony bars, seats with USB ports, boxes and suites. It was expected to hold 3,500 people. 10,000 square feet (930 m^{2}) would have been used for a training facility, broadcast studio and team offices.
