= 2022 Overwatch League Grand Finals =

2022 Overwatch League championship match

2022 OWL Grand Finals
San Francisco Shock	Dallas Fuel
3	4
- Date: November 4, 2022
- Venue: Anaheim Convention Center, Anaheim, California
- Purse: $1.5 million
- Attendance: 6,000
- MVP: Lee "Fearless" Eui-seok

Live Broadcast
- Broadcast(s): YouTube; Bilibili

The 2022 Overwatch League Grand Finals was the fifth championship match of the Overwatch League (OWL), taking place on November 4, 2022. The series was the conclusion of the 2022 Overwatch League playoffs and was played between the Dallas Fuel and the San Francisco Shock at the Anaheim Convention Center in Anaheim, California.

Dallas qualified for the season playoffs as the top seed and defeated the Hangzhou Spark, Seoul Dynasty, and Houston Outlaws all in the upper bracket to qualify for the Grand Finals. San Francisco qualified as the second seed and was defeated in their first playoff match to the Outlaws but went on to defeat the Shanghai Dragons, Los Angeles Gladiators, Dynasty, Spark, and Outlaws in the lower bracket to qualify for the Grand Finals.

In the Grand Finals match, Fuel defeated the Shock by a score of 4–3 to win their first OWL championship.

== Road to the Grand Finals ==
The Grand Finals are the post-season championship series of the Overwatch League (OWL), a professional international esports league; the teams in the 2022 Grand Finals match competed for a US$1.5 million prize pool, where the winners received $1 million. The 2022 season was the fifth season in OWL history and consisted of twenty teams. The playoffs were contested by twelve teams – eight from the league's West region and four from the league's East region.

The finalists, the San Francisco Shock and the Dallas Fuel, finished the regular season with records of 20–4 each, with the Fuel claiming the top seed of the playoffs and the Shock taking the second by way of league tiebreaking rules. Both the defending Overwatch League champions and runners-up, the Shanghai Dragons and Atlanta Reign, respectively, were eliminated in the first round of the lower bracket of the playoffs.

=== San Francisco Shock ===
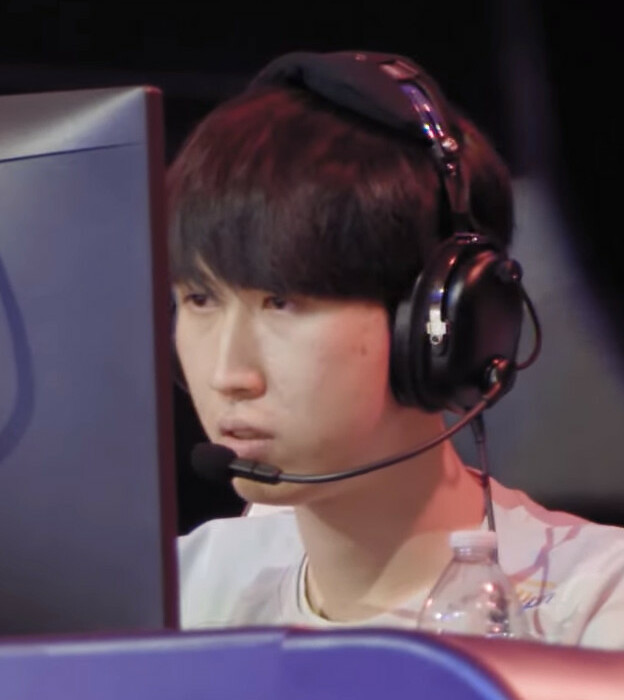
Support player Viol2t

The Shock entered the league in 2018 as one of the twelve founding franchises. Following the 2021 season, the Shock parted ways with their entire roster, aside from support player Park "Viol2t" Min-ki. The team picked up five rookies to fill their squad: damage players Jung "Kilo" Jin-woo, Kim "Proper" Dong-hyun, and Samuel "s9mm" Santos, tank player Colin "Coluge" Arai, and support player Oh "FiNN" Se-jin.

The Shock began their 2022 season with a 3–0 win over the Paris Eternal. In the first tournament cycle of the season, the Kickoff Clash, the Shock went undefeated in the qualifiers, going 6–0, and qualified for the Western Kickoff Clash tournament as the top seed. In the tournament, the team ultimately lost to the Fuel in the lower bracket. Prior to the start of the second tournament cycle, the Midseason Madness, they picked up tank player Michael "mikeyy" Konicki. The Shock went undefeated in the Midseason Madness qualifiers, improving their record to 12–0, and qualified as the top seed in the tournament. After winning every match in the upper bracket, the Shock faced the Los Angeles Gladiators in the Midseason Madness finals. However, they lost in the finals by a score of 2–4. The Shock broke the OWL record for most consecutive regular season wins in the following tournament cycle, the Summer Showdown, winning 20 matches in a row, spanning back to the 2021 regular season. The team had their first regular season loss of the season on September 2, after they were defeated by the Fuel. With a 5–1 record in the qualifiers, the Shock advanced to the Western Summer Showdown tournament as the second seed. In the tournament, the Shock lost to the Fuel in the upper bracket and were sent to the lower bracket. They reached the finals through the lower bracket, where they once again faced the Fuel. The Shock lost the match, 0–4, finishing in second place for the second tournament in a row. Prior to the end of the regular season, the Shock picked up damage player Kwon "Striker" Nam-joo, who had been a part of the Shock's championship seasons in 2019 and 2020. The team finished the regular season as the second seed in the Western region with 26 league points, 20 wins, and 4 losses. Proper received numerous accolades for his performance in the regular season, being commentated as a Role Star for damage, being named the Alarm Rookie of the Year, and earning the Most Valuable Player award.

As the second seed in the playoffs, the team received a bye into the second round of the upper bracket. For their first opponent, the Shock selected the sixth-seeded Houston Outlaws; however, they lost to the Outlaws, 2–3, and were sent to the lower bracket. From there, San Francisco made a run through the lower bracket, defeating the fifth-seeded Shanghai Dragons, third-seeded Los Angeles Gladiators, fourth-seeded Seoul Dynasty, and the twelfth-seeded Hangzhou Spark, to reach the lower bracket finals. The Shock took down the Outlaws, who had also been knocked down to the lower bracket, by a score of 3–0 to advance to the Grand Finals.

=== Dallas Fuel ===
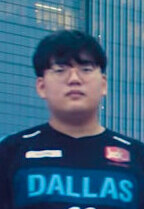
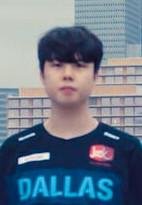
Tanks Hanbin (left) and Fearless (right)

The Dallas Fuel entered the league in 2018 as one of the twelve founding franchises. In the offseason preceding the 2022 season, the team made several roster changes. They elected not to exercise their option to retain support player Lee "Jecse" Seung-soo and hitscan specialist Kim "Pine" Do-hyeon, and support player Kim "Rapel" Jun-keun retired from professional Overwatch. They signed three free agents: support player Han "ChiYo" Hyeon-seok, damage player Kang "guriyo" Min-seo, and hitscan specialist Kim "Edison" Tae-hoon.

The Fuel's first match of the 2022 season resulted in a loss to the Houston Outlaws in the Kickoff Clash qualifiers. Throughout the Kickoff Class qualifiers, the Fuel found success running a team composition around Choi "Hanbin" Han-been on Zarya and Edison on Reaper, allowing them to win their next five matches and claim the second seed in the Western Kickoff Clash tournament. The Fuel dropped to the lower bracket of the double-elimination tournament but ran through the lower bracket and reached the finals, where they ultimately lost to the Los Angeles Gladiators. In the second tournament cycle of the season, the Midseason Madness, the Fuel were swept in their first two qualifying matches, as their Zarya-Reaper composition from the Kickoff Clash was no longer viable due to a balance patch that shifted the meta. However, the team went on to win their next four matches and claimed the third seed, and a first-round bye, in the Midseason Madness tournament. However, Dallas made an early exit from the tournament after losing to the Shanghai Dragons and Philadelphia Fusion in their first two matches. In the Summer Showdown, the third tournament cycle of the season, the league saw another meta shift with the release of Overwatch 2's newest hero, Junker Queen. With Hanbin playing as one of the league's best Junker Queens, the Fuel finished the Summer Showdown qualifiers snapping the San Francisco Shock's 20-game regular season winning streak and claiming the top seed in the Western Summer Showdown tournament with a perfect 6–0 record in the qualifiers. The Fuel went undefeated in the tournament, finishing it with a 4–0 win over the Shock in the finals, and claimed their first tournament title of the season. The team finished the regular season as the top seed in the Western region with 26 league points, 20 wins, and 4 losses. Additionally, Kwon "Fielder" Joon, ChiYo and Hanbin were awarded Role Star commendations at the end of the regular season for the support, support, and tank roles, respectively.

In the playoffs, the league saw another meta shift, with the release of the hero Kiriko, and Dallas elected to bring back Lee "Fearless" Eui-seok into the starting roster over Hanbin, with Fearless playing Winston. With a bye to the second round of the upper bracket, the Fuel selected the twelfth-seeded Hangzhou Spark as their first opponent; Dallas defeated them by a score of 3–1. Next, they swept the fourth-seeded Seoul Dynasty, 3–0, in the upper bracket semifinals. In the upper bracket finals, the Fuel faced their in-state rivals, the Outlaws. Dallas lost the first map of the match but went on to win the following three, defeating the Outlaws, 3–1, and advanced to the Grand Finals.

=== Summary of results ===
Qualified playoff teams
Seed	Team	Region	Points	Record	MR	MD
1	Dallas Fuel	West	26	20–4	61–26–0	+35
2	San Francisco Shock	West	26	20–4	65–27–0	+38
3	Los Angeles Gladiators	West	25	18–6	64–29–0	+35
4	Seoul Dynasty	East	25	19–5	62–24–0	+38
5	Shanghai Dragons	East	23	18–6	57–30–0	+27
6	Houston Outlaws	West	19	16–8	56–42–0	+14
7	Atlanta Reign	West	16	13–11	51–42–0	+9
8	London Spitfire	West	16	14–10	50–41–0	+9
9	Philadelphia Fusion	East	15	11–13	50–50–0	±0
10	Florida Mayhem	West	15	12–12	46–45–0	+1
11	Toronto Defiant	West	15	12–12	48–49–0	-1
12	Hangzhou Spark	East	13	11–13	46–49–0	-3

San Francisco Shock playoffs matches
Round	Opponent	Score
Upper round 2	(6) Houston Outlaws	2–3
Lower round 1	(5) Shanghai Dragons	3–1
Lower round 2	(3) Los Angeles Gladiators	3–1
Lower round 3	(4) Seoul Dynasty	3–0
Lower round 4	(12) Hangzhou Spark	3–1
Lower final	(6) Houston Outlaws	3–0

Dallas Fuel playoffs matches
Round	Opponent	Score
Upper round 2	(12) Hangzhou Spark	3–1
Upper round 3	(4) Seoul Dynasty	3–0
Upper final	(6) Houston Outlaws	3–1

== Venue ==
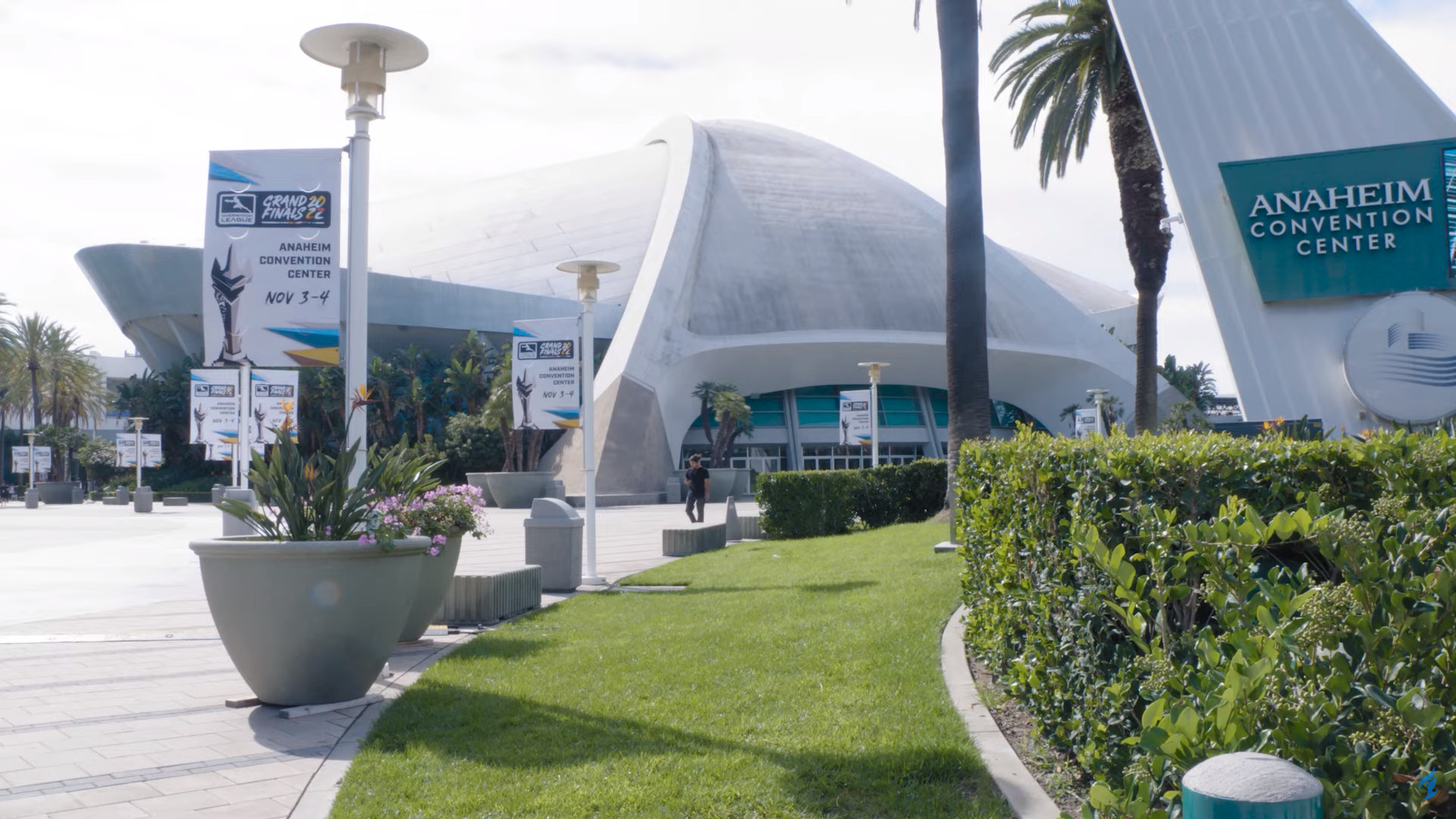
The 2022 Grand Finals were played at the Anaheim Convention Center.

The Anaheim Convention Center in Anaheim, California was announced as the 2022 OWL Grand Finals host venue on September 19, 2022. It was the first time that the Grand Finals had been held live since the 2019 Grand Finals in Philadelphia. The Anaheim Convention Center opened in 1967 and is the largest exhibit facility on the West Coast. Its arena has a seating capacity of 7,500 seats. Since opening, the center has been the site of a number of other notable events, including VidCon, BlizzCon, Anime Expo, D23 Expo, WonderCon, and NAMM Show.

== Broadcast ==
The Grand Finals match was live-streamed on YouTube. The 2022 season was the first time that the OWL had allowed co-streams of their matches, where select streamers were able to stream OWL broadcasts simultaneously with their own, and co-streams were restricted to only be broadcast on YouTube. TimTheTatman, who is also a YouTube exclusive streamer, held a co-stream of the match. Players who watch the live broadcast of the Grand Finals can earn League Tokens, an Overwatch 2 in-game currency that allows them to purchase in-game cosmetics, as well as three Overwatch League skins.

During the broadcast, prior to the match, Blizzard showcased Overwatch 2's newest playable character Ramattra. Additionally, there was an interview with lead hero designer Alec Dawson and art director Dion Rogers.

The Grand Finals saw a peak viewership on YouTube of 350,000 on the main Overwatch League channel and saw an average viewership of around 300,000 for a majority of the match.

== Match summary ==
Grand Finals	November 4	San Francisco Shock	3	–	4	Dallas Fuel	Anaheim, CA
	7:00 pm PDT	Details					Anaheim Convention Center
		1	Lijiang Tower			2	
		2	King's Row			1	
		3	Dorado			2	
		0	Esperança			1	
		2	Oasis			1	
		1	Route 66			2	
		0	Colosseo			1	

== Rosters ==
=== San Francisco Shock ===
2022 San Francisco Shock roster
Players
Coaches

Role	No.	Handle	Name	Nationality
Damage	37	Kilo	Jung Jin-woo	South Korea
Damage	88	Striker	Kwon Nam-joo	South Korea
Damage	77	Proper	Kim Dong-hyun	South Korea
Damage	13	s9mm	Santos, Samuel	United States
Tank	7	Coluge	Arai, Colin	United States
Tank	3	Mikeyy	Konicki, Michael	United States
Support	17	Viol2t	Park Min-ki	South Korea
Support	99	FiNN	Oh Se-jin	South Korea

Head coach

- Park "Crusty" Dae-hee

Assistant coach(es)

- Cas "Casores" van Andel
- Kim "NineK" Bum-hoon

Legend:
- (I) Inactive
- (S) Suspended
- (2W) Two-way player
- Substitute
- (injured) Injury / Illness

Latest roster transaction: September 29, 2022.

=== Dallas Fuel ===
2022 Dallas Fuel roster
Players
Coaches

Role	No.	Handle	Name	Nationality
Damage	20	Doha	Kim Dong-ha	South Korea
Damage	1	Sp9rk1e	Kim Yeong-han	South Korea
Damage	7	Edison	Kim Tae-hoon	South Korea
Damage	26	guriyo	Kang Min-seo	South Korea
Tank	8	Fearless	Lee Eui-seok	South Korea
Tank	11	Hanbin	Choi Han-been	South Korea
Support	9	ChiYo	Han Hyeon-seok	South Korea
Support	31	Fielder	Kwon Joon	South Korea

Head coach

- Yun "RUSH" Hee-won

Assistant coach(es)

- Go "Aid" Jae-yoon
- Kim "Rascal" Dong-jun

Legend:
- (I) Inactive
- (S) Suspended
- (2W) Two-way player
- Substitute
- (injured) Injury / Illness

Latest roster transaction: October 22, 2021.
