= Dallas Fuel =

American professional esports team

- Founded: February 3, 2016
- League: Overwatch Champions Series
- Region: North America
- Team history: Team EnVyUs (2016–2017); Dallas Fuel (2017–2023, 2025–present)
- Based in: Dallas, United States
- Arena: Esports Stadium Arlington
- Colors
- Owner: Mike Rufail; Kenneth Hersh
- General manager: Matthew "TazMo" Taylor
- Affiliation: Team Envy
- Championships: OWL 2022
- Parent group: ENVY
- Website: Official website

Dallas Fuel is an American professional Overwatch team based in Dallas, Texas. The Fuel competes in the Overwatch Champions Series (OWCS) as a member of the North American region. Founded in 2017, Dallas Fuel was one of the Overwatch League's (OWL) twelve founding franchises and was one of two professional Overwatch teams based in Texas (the other, Houston Outlaws). The Fuel became the first team to play a home match in the OWL, as they hosted the "Dallas Fuel Homestand Weekend" at the Allen Event Center in 2019. The Fuel folded in September 2023 while under the ownership of OpTic Gaming. Two years later, in November 2025, the team was reestablished by ENVY, who had previously owned the team.

Kyle "KyKy" Souder was appointed the team's first head coach, but after a disappointing first half of the 2018 season, he was replaced by Aaron "Aero" Atkins. Atkins led the team to a Stage 4 playoff berth in 2018 but could not bring the Fuel to the Overwatch League season playoffs. After a disappointing start to the 2020 season, the Fuel released Atkins, and in the 2021 offseason, the Fuel signed former Paris Eternal head coach Yun "RUSH" Hee-won as their new head coach, who, in 2021, led the team to a midseason tournament title and the franchise's first season playoff appearance. The Fuel won their first OWL championship in the 2022 season after defeating the San Francisco Shock, 4–3, in the 2022 Grand Finals.

== Franchise history ==
=== Team origins: 2016–2017 ===
Formed during the Overwatch closed beta in February 2016, the Dallas Fuel originally started as an all-American roster playing under the Overwatch division for esports franchise Team Envy. Even though their original roster showed some early promise in online tournaments, just before the official launch of Overwatch they disbanded. Their next turn in forming a roster saw them look abroad, eventually bringing players from across Europe to their Charlotte headquarters and securing the core of what would become the Dallas Fuel in Sebastian "chipshajen" Widlund, Christian "cocco" Jonsson, Jonathan "HarryHook" Tejedor Rua, and Timo "Taimou" Kettunen. The team found much success, going on to win Season 1 of OGN's Overwatch APEX in Seoul, Korea, winning the Overwatch NA Invitational at MLG Vegas, and going undefeated and winning 2018 Season 1 of North America Overwatch Contenders. The Contenders playoffs marked both the debut of Brandon "Seagull" Larned as well as the final event played under the "Team EnVyUs" moniker.

After weeks of speculation, on September 20, 2017, Blizzard officially announced that Envy Gaming had acquired the Dallas-based Overwatch League franchise spot, making them one of twelve teams competing in the inaugural season. Envy Gaming filled the Fuel roster by transferring all of the members and staff from the Overwatch team of Team EnVyUs, which officially ended EnVyUs' Overwatch division. On October 5, 2017, the Dallas-based franchise name was revealed as the Dallas Fuel. In late October, the Fuel announced that Scott "Custa" Kennedy and Félix "xQc" Lengyel would be rounding out their 9-player roster, joining existing members chipshajen, cocco, EFFECT, HarryHook, Mickie, Seagull, and Taimou.

=== Aero era: 2018–2020 ===
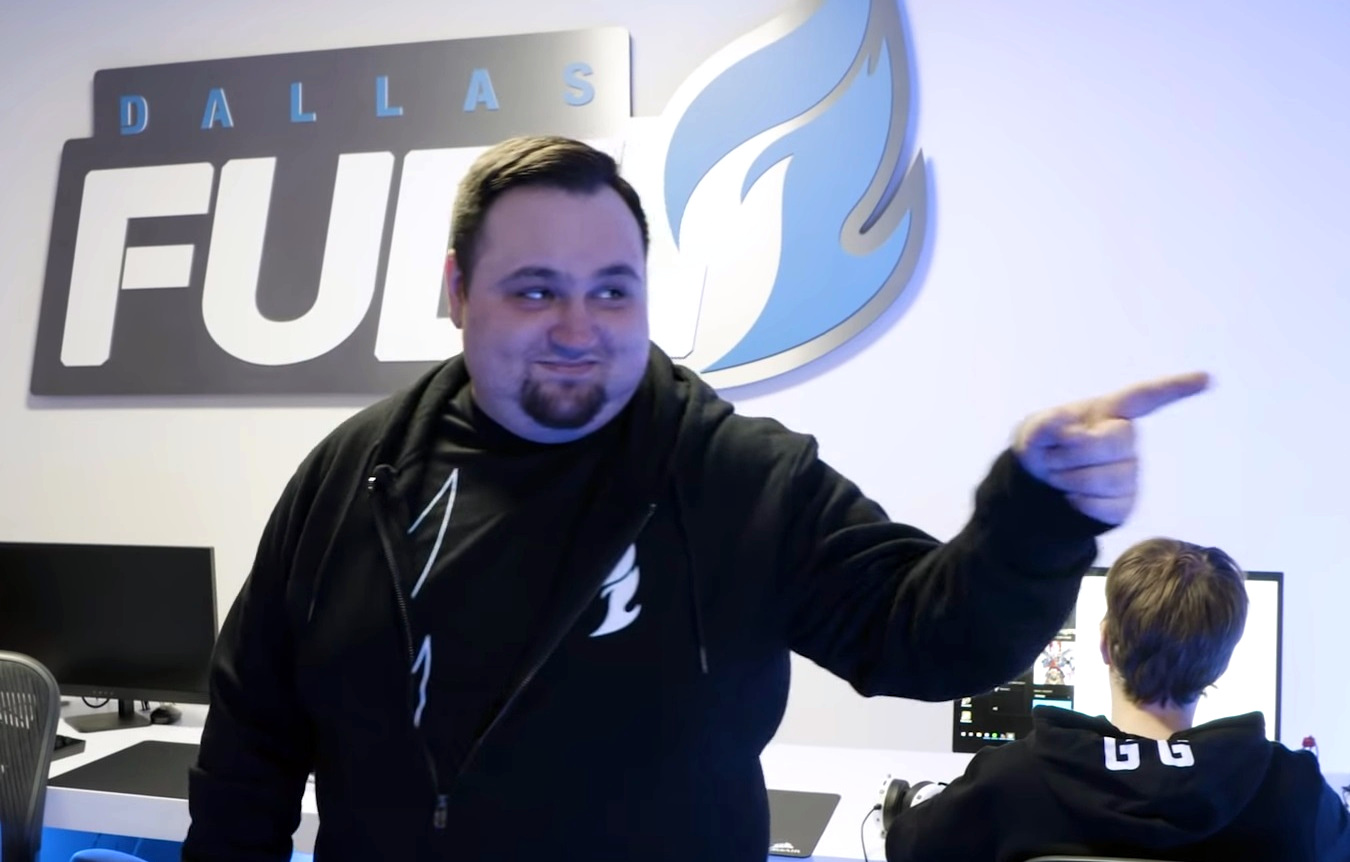
Aaron "Aero" Atkins took over as head coach in 2018 Stage 4.

In December 2017, the Fuel went undefeated in the first Overwatch League preseason. Shortly afterwards on January 10, 2018, the Fuel began their inaugural regular season campaign. Their debut match resulted in a 1–2 loss to the Seoul Dynasty. They struggled throughout Stage 1; xQc was suspended on January 19 for four games by the Overwatch League, which was extended to the entire stage by the Fuel, and Dallas ended Stage 1 with a 3–7 record in 10th place. In Stage 2, the Fuel signed tank player Son "OGE" Min-seok and released xQc, after he received his second suspension from the OWL. The team finished Stage 2 in 11th place with a 2–8 record. Early in Stage 3, head coach KyKy and damage player Kim "Rascal" Dong-jun, who was acquired from the London Spitfire in February, were released, and assistant coach Emanuel "Peak" Uzoni was named the interim head coach. The team's only victory in the stage was over the winless Shanghai Dragons, making their stage record 1–9. The team signed Fusion University head coach Aaron "Aero" Atkins before the fourth stage began. The Fuel won a season-high 6 matches in Stage 4, including victories against top-six opponents the Valiant, Uprising, Spitfire, and Fusion. The record would be good enough for a fourth-place finish and the team's first ever stage playoffs berth. In the stage semifinals, the team lost, 2–3, against back-to-back stage champions New York Excelsior, the match marking the end of their season, as they would finish in 10th place with a record of 12–28.

In their first full season under head coach Aero, the team looked to improve on their disappointing 12–28 record from 2018. Dallas began their 2019 season posting an impressive 4–2 record through six games, but a 2–3 loss in the final match of the stage to the Boston Uprising eliminated the team from Stage 1 Playoff contention. The team hit their stride in Stage 2, amassing a 5–2 record, and qualified for the Stage 2 Playoffs. However, they were knocked out in the quarterfinals round by the Vancouver Titans in a 0–3 loss. The Fuel fell apart in the final half of the season, finding only one win in their final fourteen matches. With a 10–18 record for the season, the Fuel again did not qualify for the season playoffs.

After a 7–10 start to their 2020 season and failure to make it past the quarterfinals in any of the three midseason tournaments, the Fuel released head coach Aaron "Aero" Atkins on August 3 and announced that assistant coach Kim Yong-jin served would as the interim head coach for the remainder of the season. Dallas finished the season with a 9–12 record, marking their third consecutive season with a losing regular season record. A 0–3 loss to the Washington Justice on September 4 in the North America play-ins tournament took the Fuel out of postseason contention.

=== RUSH era: 2021–2023 ===
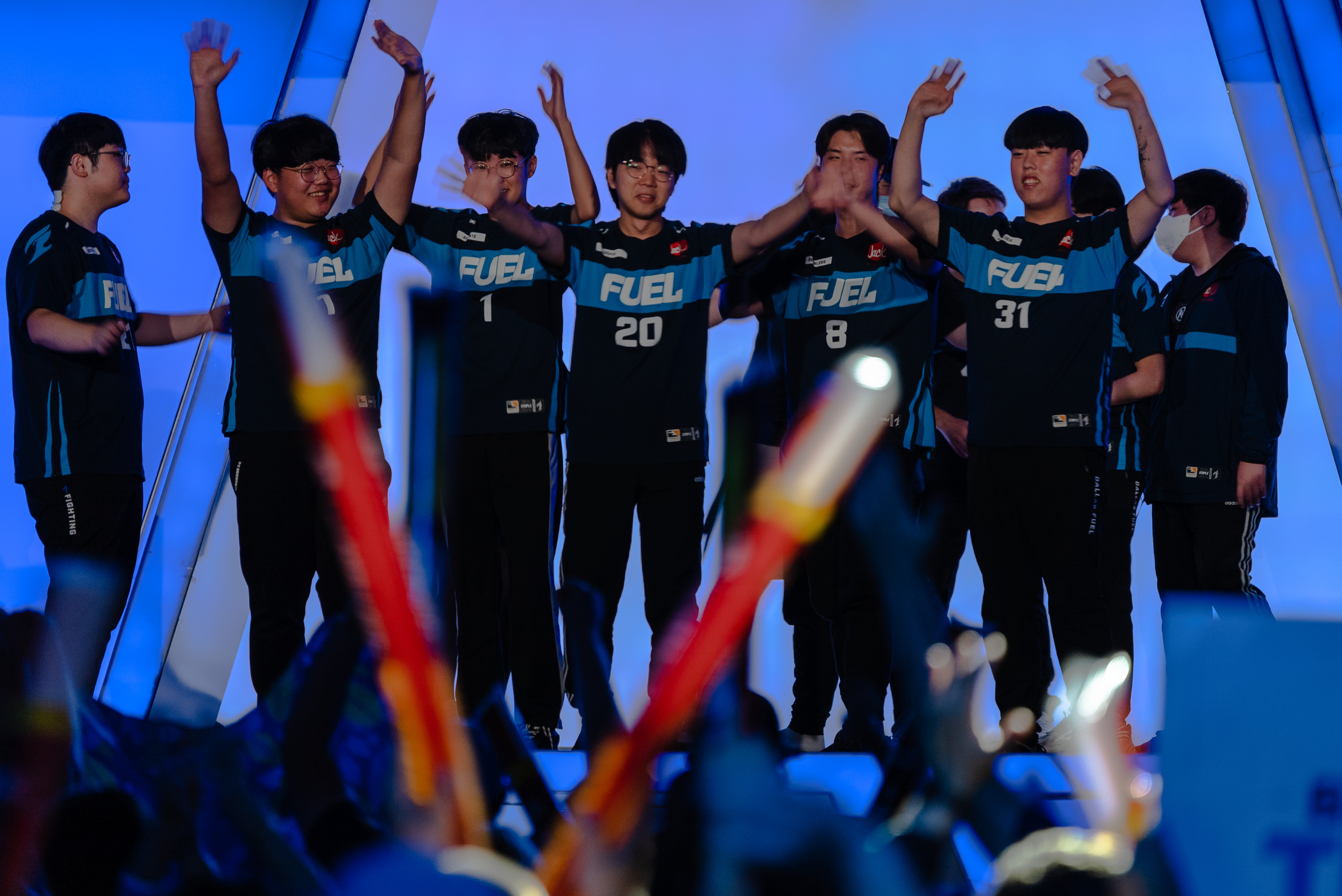
Dallas Fuel team in 2021

In the 2021 offseason, the Fuel signed former Paris Eternal head coach Yun "RUSH" Hee-won as their new head coach. They overhauled their roster, adding former Shanghai Dragons tank player Lee "Fearless" Eui-seok and former Paris Eternal damage player Kim "SP9RK1E" Yeong-han, among others. The Fuel began their 2021 season on April 16, 2021, with a loss against in-state rivals Houston Outlaws. The Fuel advanced to the May Melee finals, the franchise's first-ever Overwatch League final. They defeated the Shanghai Dragons, 4–2, giving the franchise their first Overwatch League midseason tournament title. They reached the finals in the following tournament cycle, the June Joust, but they lost to the Dragons in the finals, 3–4. In the Summer Showdown, the third tournament cycle of the regular season, the Fuel advanced past the qualifiers and regional knockout, making their third consecutive tournament appearance of the season, but they were ultimately eliminated from the tournament after a loss to the Chengdu Hunters in the lower bracket finals. The Fuel did not reach the main tournament in the final tournament cycle of the regular season, the Countdown Cup. The team finished the regular season at the top of the standings in the West region with 11 wins, 5 losses, and 17 league points. The finish gave them the second seed in the season playoffs, behind the top-seeded Shanghai Dragons. Head coach Yun "RUSH" Hee-won was named the league's coach of the year and damage player Kim "SP9RK1E" Yeong-han received the Dennis Hawelka Award. Additionally, Kim "SP9RK1E" Young-han, Lee "Fearless" Eui-seok, Choi "Hanbin" Han-been, and Joon "Fielder" Kwon were awarded Role Star commendations. With four players, the Fuel were tied with the Dragons for the most players receiving the award in the 2021 season. In the 2021 playoffs, Dallas reached the upper bracket finals before losing to the Dragons, 1–3. In the lower bracket finals, the Fuel lost to the Atlanta Reign, 1–3, ending their playoff run.

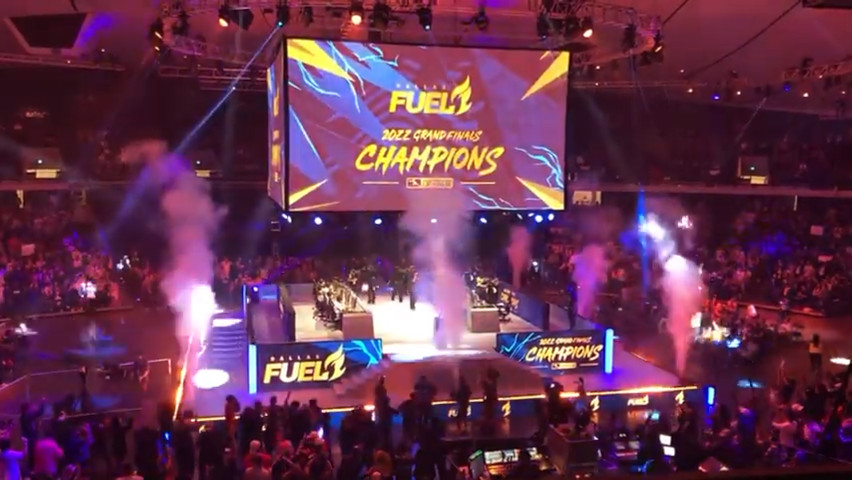
The Fuel won the 2022 Overwatch League Grand Finals.

In the offseason preceding the 2022 season, the team made several roster changes. They elected not to exercise their option to retain support player Lee "Jecse" Seung-soo and hitscan specialist Kim "Pine" Do-hyeon, and support player Kim "Rapel" Jun-keun retired from professional Overwatch. They signed three free agents: support player Han "ChiYo" Hyeon-seok, damage player Kang "guriyo" Min-seo, and hitscan specialist Kim "Edison" Tae-hoon. The Fuel's first match of the 2022 season resulted in a loss to the Houston Outlaws in the Kickoff Clash qualifiers. Throughout the Kickoff Class qualifiers, the Fuel found success running a team composition around Hanbin on Zarya and Edison on Reaper, allowing them to win their next five matches and claim the second seed in the Western Kickoff Clash tournament. The Fuel dropped to the lower bracket of the double-elimination tournament but ran through the lower bracket and reached the finals, where they ultimately lost to the Los Angeles Gladiators. In the second tournament cycle of the season, the Midseason Madness, the Fuel were swept in their first two qualifying matches, as their Zarya-Reaper composition from the Kickoff Clash was no longer viable due to a balance patch that shifted the meta. However, the team went on to win their next four matches and claimed the third seed, and a first-round bye, in the Midseason Madness tournament. However, Dallas made an early exit from the tournament after losing to the Shanghai Dragons and Philadelphia Fusion in their first two matches. In the Summer Showdown, the third tournament cycle of the season, the league saw another meta shift with the release of Overwatch 2's newest hero, Junker Queen. With Hanbin playing as one of the league's best Junker Queens, the Fuel finished the Summer Showdown qualifiers snapping the San Francisco Shock's 20-game regular season winning streak and claiming the top seed in the Western Summer Showdown tournament with a perfect 6–0 record in the qualifiers. The Fuel went undefeated in the tournament, finishing it with a 4–0 win over the Shock in the finals, and claimed their first tournament title of the season. The team finished the regular season as the top seed in the Western region with 26 league points, 20 wins, and 4 losses. Additionally, Kwon "Fielder" Joon, ChiYo and Hanbin were awarded Role Star commendations at the end of the regular season for the support, support, and tank roles, respectively. In the playoffs, the league saw another meta shift, with the release of the hero Kiriko, and Dallas elected to bring back Lee "Fearless" Eui-seok into the starting roster over Hanbin, with Fearless playing Winston. With a bye to the second round of the upper bracket, the Fuel selected the twelfth-seeded Hangzhou Spark as their first opponent; Dallas defeated them by a score of 3–1. Next, they swept the fourth-seeded Seoul Dynasty, 3–0, in the upper bracket semifinals. In the upper bracket finals, the Fuel faced their in-state rivals, the Outlaws. Dallas lost the first map of the match but went on to win the following three, defeating the Outlaws, 3–1, and advanced to the Grand Finals. The Fuel faced the Shock in the Grand Finals match. The match went to seven maps; Dallas defeated San Francisco by a score of 4–3 to claim their first OWL championship title. Fearless was named the OWL Grand Finals MVP.

For the 2023 season, the Fuel competed in South Korea as a part of the League's Eastern region. The team disbanded before the folding of the Overwatch League on September 30, 2023.

=== OWCS return: 2025–present ===
On January 17, 2025, Mike "Hastr0" Rufail announced that he had acquired all of Envy Gaming's trademarks from OpTic Gaming, including the Call of Duty League Dallas Empire (now OpTic Texas) and Dallas Fuel brands, relaunching the Team Envy franchise as simply Envy. While Envy's return didn't immediately put them or the Fuel back into Overwatch and the new Overwatch Champions Series (OWCS), which replaced the OWL after 2023, it was announced on November 29 that the Dallas Fuel would return to Overwatch in time for 2026, playing in the OWCS North America region. In addition, the Fuel would become an OWCS Partner.

== Team identity ==
On October 5, 2017, the Dallas Fuel brand was officially unveiled. The creation stemmed from the Overwatch League requirement for participating franchises to create new geolocated brands, as well as business entities, specific to the league.

Due to the energy's sector's influence on Dallas culture and economy, plus the rich energy sector legacy of new investment partners Hersh Interactive Group led by Dallas-based Kenneth Hersh, the name "Fuel" was eventually selected. In addition, the team revealed they hoped the selection would appeal to fans from all walks of life.

With the franchise looking to breathe new life into esports fans in Dallas and hoping to transcend current industry standards, the iconic blue flame was selected to symbolize the spark that would ignite the change. The logo also paid homage to the heritage and strength of the energy sector in Texas, the industry in which team investor Kenneth Hersh made his riches.

The official team colors were blue, grey, and black. Blue served as the primary team color in recognition of the endearment "Boys in Blue" that the team had acquired under parent organization EnVyUs. The Fuel's jerseys were white on away games and blue on home games; they also had the Jack in the Box logo, the first OWL jersey sponsor, prominently placed on the front.

== Ownership and finances ==
On September 18, 2017, Envy Gaming owner Mike "Hastr0" Rufail, a Texas native, confirmed that the organization had secured a multimillion-dollar investment from Hersh Interactive Group. The deal entailed Hersh serving as strategic partners to the organization, whilst Hastr0 would remain as the principal owner and operator of the team. Soon after, on September 20, it was officially announced that the Dallas-based Overwatch League franchise had been acquired by Team Envy for a reported $20 million.

In November 2017, Team Envy signed a multimillion-dollar, multiyear deal with the restaurant chain Jack in the Box. As part of the deal, Jack in the Box became the official quick-service restaurant and exclusive jersey rights partner of the Fuel, as well as having their logo featured on official team merchandise available for purchase by the public. The team partnership marked the first of its kind in the Overwatch League.

In June 2022, the Fuel's ownership changed hands, as OpTic Gaming purchased Envy Gaming and Envy retired its brand. In January 2025, Hastr0 purchased Envy Gaming's trademarks back from OpTic, including the Dallas Fuel brand, to revive Envy.

== Home arenas ==
The Fuel in 2019 became the first team in the Overwatch League to host a home game. The two-day event, the Dallas Fuel Homestand Weekend, took place at the Allen Event Center in Allen, Texas and sold out 4,500 seats each day. Held in part to test the viability of the league's plan to hold matches locally, Dallas Fuel was responsible for every aspect of the weekend aside from the broadcast, which was aired on ESPN2. Marking the highest viewership of 2019 Stage 2, the homestand showed that the local-match model has promise.

The Fuel was slated to host a league-high five homestand weekends in the 2020 season. The matches would have taken place at Esports Stadium Arlington, Toyota Music Factory, Allen Event Center, and two more undetermined locations. These homestand weekends were later cancelled due to the COVID-19 pandemic.

== Personnel ==
=== Current roster ===
Dallas Fuel roster
Players
Coaches

| Role | Handle | Name | Nationality |
|---|---|---|---|
| Support | Cjay | Smith, Christopher | United States |
| Support | Lukemino | Fish, Luke | United States |
| Tank | Kellan | Kim Min-jae | South Korea |
| DPS | Kronic | Iacobacci, Rocco | United States |
| DPS | SeonJun | Park Seon-jun | South Korea |

Head coach

Eric "Wheats" Perez

Assistant coach(es)

Kim "Yong" Yong-jin

Legend:
- (I) Inactive
- (S) Suspended
- Substitute
- (injured) Injury / Illness

Roster updated January 22, 2026.

=== Head coaches ===
| Handle | Name | Seasons | Record | Notes | Ref. |
|---|---|---|---|---|---|
| KyKy | Kyle Souder | 2018 | 6–18 (.250) | Fired after 25 games in 2018. | |
| Peak | Emanuel Uzoni | 2018 | 0–6 (.000) | Interim head coach. | |
| Aero | Aaron Atkins | 2018–2020 | 23–32 (.418) | Fired after 17 games in 2020. | |
| Yong | Kim Yong-jin | 2020 | 2–2 (.500) | Interim head coach. | |
| RUSH | Yun Hee-won | 2021–present | 31–9 (.775) | | |

== Awards and records ==
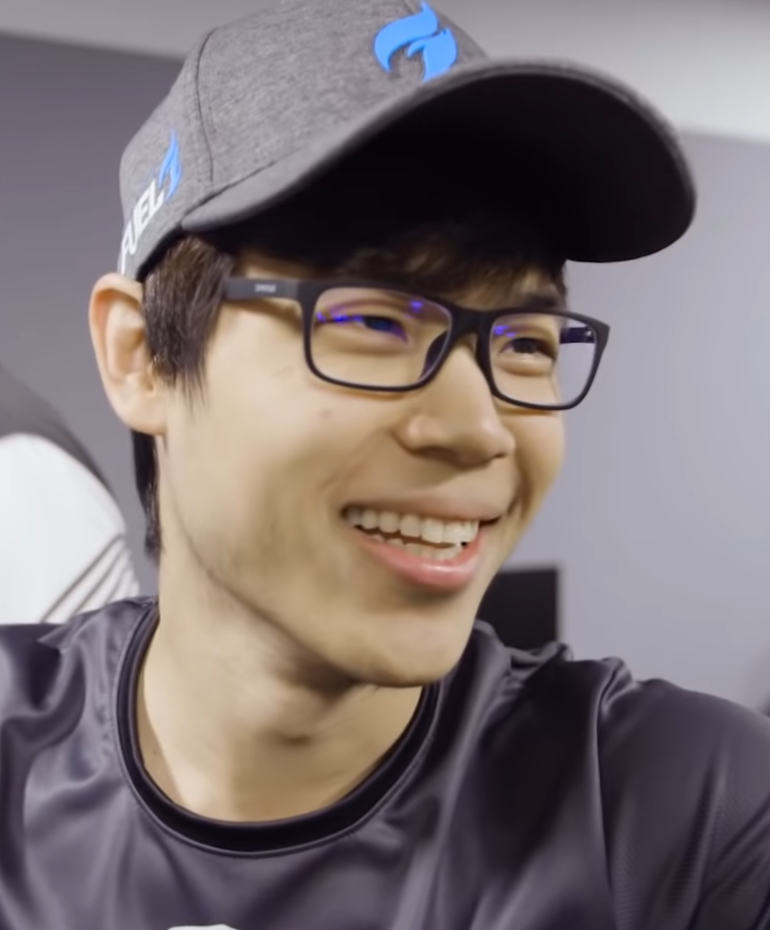
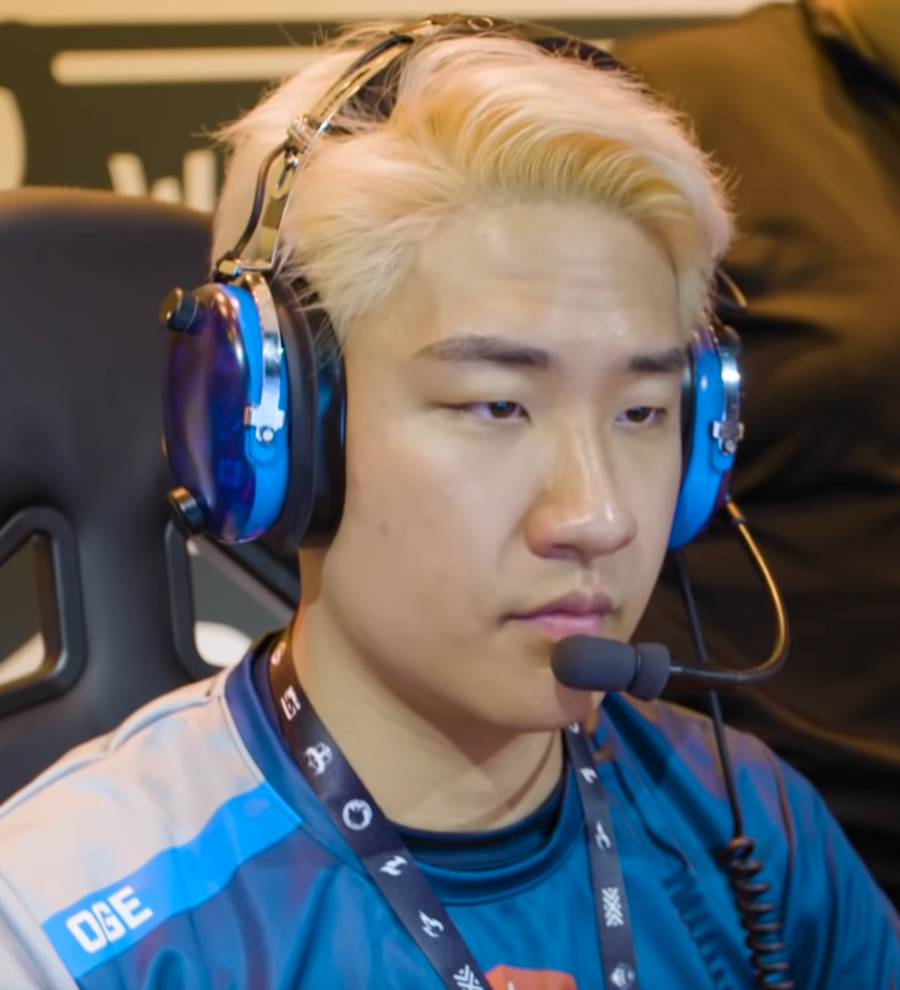
Pongphop "Mickie" Rattanasangchod (left) was awarded the Dennis Hawelka Award in 2018, and Son "OGE" Min-seok (right) was selected for the All-Star team in 2018 and 2019

=== Seasons overview ===
| Season | P | W | L | W% | Finish | Playoffs |
|---|---|---|---|---|---|---|
| 2018 | 40 | 12 | 28 | .300 | 5th, Pacific | Did not qualify |
| 2019 | 28 | 10 | 18 | .357 | 10th, Pacific | Did not qualify |
| 2020 | 21 | 9 | 12 | .429 | 8th, North America | Did not qualify |
| 2021 | 16 | 11 | 5 | .688 | 1st, West | Lost in Lower Final, 1–3 (Reign) |
| 2022 | 24 | 20 | 4 | .833 | 1st, West | OWL Champions, 4–3 (Shock) |

=== Individual accomplishments ===
Dennis Hawelka Award

- Mickie (Pongphop Rattanasangchod) – 2018
- Sp9rk1e (Kim Yeong-han) – 2021

Coach of the Year

- RUSH (Yun Hee-won) – 2021

Role Star selections

- Sp9rk1e (Kim Yeong-han) – 2021
- Fearless (Lee Eui-seok) – 2021
- Hanbin (Choi Han-been) – 2021
- Fielder (Joon Kwon) – 2021

All-Star Game selections

- Mickie (Pongphop Rattanasangchod) – 2018
- Seagull (Brandon Larned) – 2018
- OGE (Son Min-seok) – 2018, 2019
- Crimzo (William Hernandez) - 2020

== Academy team ==
On July 2, 2018, the Envy Gaming formally announced that their esports franchise Team Envy would compete as an academy team for the Dallas Fuel in Overwatch Contenders North America, as Envy had acquired EnVision Esports' Contenders slot and roster and signed former Team EnVyUs member Ronnie "Talespin" DuPree.
