= Overwatch League =

Defunct esports league

- Game: Overwatch, Overwatch 2
- Founded: 2017
- First season: 2018
- Folded: 2024
- Replaced by: Overwatch Champions Series
- Owner: Blizzard Entertainment
- Commissioner: Johanna Faries
- No. of teams: 20
- Countries: United States (11); China (4); Canada (2); South Korea (2); United Kingdom (1)
- Last champion: Florida Mayhem
- Most titles: San Francisco Shock (2)
- Related competitions: Overwatch Champions Series; Overwatch Contenders; Open Division
- Website: overwatchleague.com

The Overwatch League (OWL) was a professional esports league for the video game Overwatch and its sequel Overwatch 2, produced by its developer, Blizzard Entertainment. From 2018 to 2023, the Overwatch League followed the model of other traditional North American professional sporting leagues by using a set of permanent, city-based teams backed by separate ownership groups. The league used the regular season and playoffs format rather than promotion and relegation used commonly in other esports and non-North American leagues, with players on the roster being assured a minimum annual salary, benefits, and a portion of winnings and revenue-sharing based on team performance.

The Overwatch League was announced in 2016 and secured commitments from 12 teams across the United States, Europe, and Asia, each investing $20 million in franchise fees, to participate in its 2018 inaugural season. The league faced skeptics who questioned its potential success due to the lack of a proven concept and a game without a substantial esports history. For the following season, the Overwatch League brought in eight new franchises, each investing between $35 million to $60 million.

In 2020, the outbreak of the COVID-19 pandemic led to widespread disruptions and forced the league to abandon its original homestand model and shift to an online format, where teams competed remotely from their respective regions. While the suspension of in-person events provided a temporary solution, it also raised concerns about its financial viability. However, some team owners noted that not having live events allowed them to mitigate financial losses that they would have otherwise incurred. During the 2021 season, in the wake of a lawsuit filed against Activision Blizzard, nearly all of the league's sponsors withdrew their support from the league.

In November 2022, a broken partnership with NetEase and Blizzard resulted in access to Overwatch 2 being suspended in China. As a result, the league allowed Overwatch Contenders teams to compete in its Eastern Region for the following season, and the league saw its first team leave, as the Chengdu Hunters dissolved. In January 2023, Overwatch League teams collectively initiated a collective bargaining process, which resulted in the Overwatch League agreeing to waive all outstanding franchise fees. By November 2023, Blizzard had announced that Overwatch esports was "transitioning" from the Overwatch League into a more traditional esports structure for the title, which would become the Overwatch Champions Series (OWCS) in 2024.

== Format ==
The Overwatch League was owned by Blizzard Entertainment and run by Major League Gaming, which is also owned by Blizzard's parent company Activision Blizzard. The Overwatch League played out similar to most North American professional sports leagues, in which all teams played scheduled games against other teams to vie for position in the season's playoffs, rather than the approach of team promotion and relegation more commonly used in other esports leagues. The league featured twenty teams split between two conferences based on their location: East and West. The East had eight teams, while the West had twelve.

The 2018 season consisted of non-regulation pre-season play, a regular season divided into four stages, and a post-season playoffs tournament to determine the championship team for the season. Each regular season stage lasted five weeks, with each stage ending with a short playoff of the top teams based on that stage's records to determine stage champions. Teams played 40 matches across the regular season, playing teams both within and outside their division. The post-season playoffs used teams' overall standings across all stages. The top standing team in both divisions received the top two seed in the playoffs, followed by a fixed number of teams determined from across both divisions. An All-Star weekend is also held, featuring two division-based teams selected by league representatives and voted on by fans.

The 2019 season format was similar to that of the previous season, though stage playoffs for the fourth stage were eliminated and the number of matches was decreased to 28, among other changes. The 2020 season introduced a number of changes, including a home-and-away format, where each team would host home games with up to eight teams per homestand event, and the elimination of the stage format. This format was eventually changed to a bimonthly tournament-based season in April due to the global impact of the COVID-19 pandemic.

Teams are awarded with monetary prizes for how they place at the end of the regular season, as well as for participating and placing high in the stage playoffs and post-season tournament. For example, the first season had a total prize pool of US$3.5 million available, with the top prize of $1 million awarded to the post-season championship team.

=== Rules ===
Overwatch is a five-versus-five team-based first-person shooter video game. Broadly, the goal is to work with team members to eliminate or repel opponents while attacking, defending, or competing for an objective. Players select from the game's roster of thirty-three heroes, split between classes of Damage (the main attackers), Support (providing healing and other buffs), and Tank (shielding teammates with high health amounts) each with their own pre-designed set of weapons and skill kits, though each player on a team must play a unique hero. Starting with stage four of the 2019 season, each team must be composed of two Damage heroes, two Supports, and two Tanks. A player can switch to an available hero within the same class if they are eliminated prior to respawning, or if they return to their current spawn point, which allows for teams to adjust their composition dynamically based on the current situation.

Within league play, a regular season match featured two teams (one selected as the home team, the other as the visiting team) playing a best-of-five format, with each map featuring a predetermined map type, following the same gameplay format as with normal competitive mode in Overwatch: Control maps, played on a best-of-three rounds, and Assault, Escort, and Hybrid maps, with each team having at least one chance as the attacking team. The pool of specific maps from the standard Overwatch rotation were determined periodically, allowing the teams to determine their player lineups and strategy while also changing the season's metagame. A team may have called in substitutes for players only between maps. The team that won three maps first won the match. If teams are tied after four games, a tiebreaker game played on a Control map (which cannot end in a tie) was used to break the tie and determine the match winner. Standings were based primarily on the overall match win–loss record, but ties were broken based on the total map win–loss record. Any further ties for tournament placement were broken based first on the head-to-head game win–loss record, then head-to-head match count.

Overwatch League games were played on a custom server controlled by Blizzard; this server is also available to players for practices. This version of the game received similar updates to the main commercial game, adding new maps and heroes, and altering the various hero abilities based on testing within the Public Test Realm. However, these updates were not applied immediately as they are for the commercial game, but instead no more frequent than once every six weeks. For example, a late January 2018 patch, which had significant effects on characters like Mercy and thus had potential to upset the metagame, was not applied to the league server until mid-February, at the start of the second stage. However, teams were given access to private servers updated to alongside the main release of Overwatch for them to practice and scrimmage against other teams to learn and develop strategies on updates and patches before experiencing them in official matches. For matches, each player was provided with an identical desktop computer, monitor, and pair of noise-cancelling headphones to play on to eliminate any handicaps related to computational or graphics processing, but players may have used their preferred keyboard and mouse.

=== Player eligibility and benefits ===
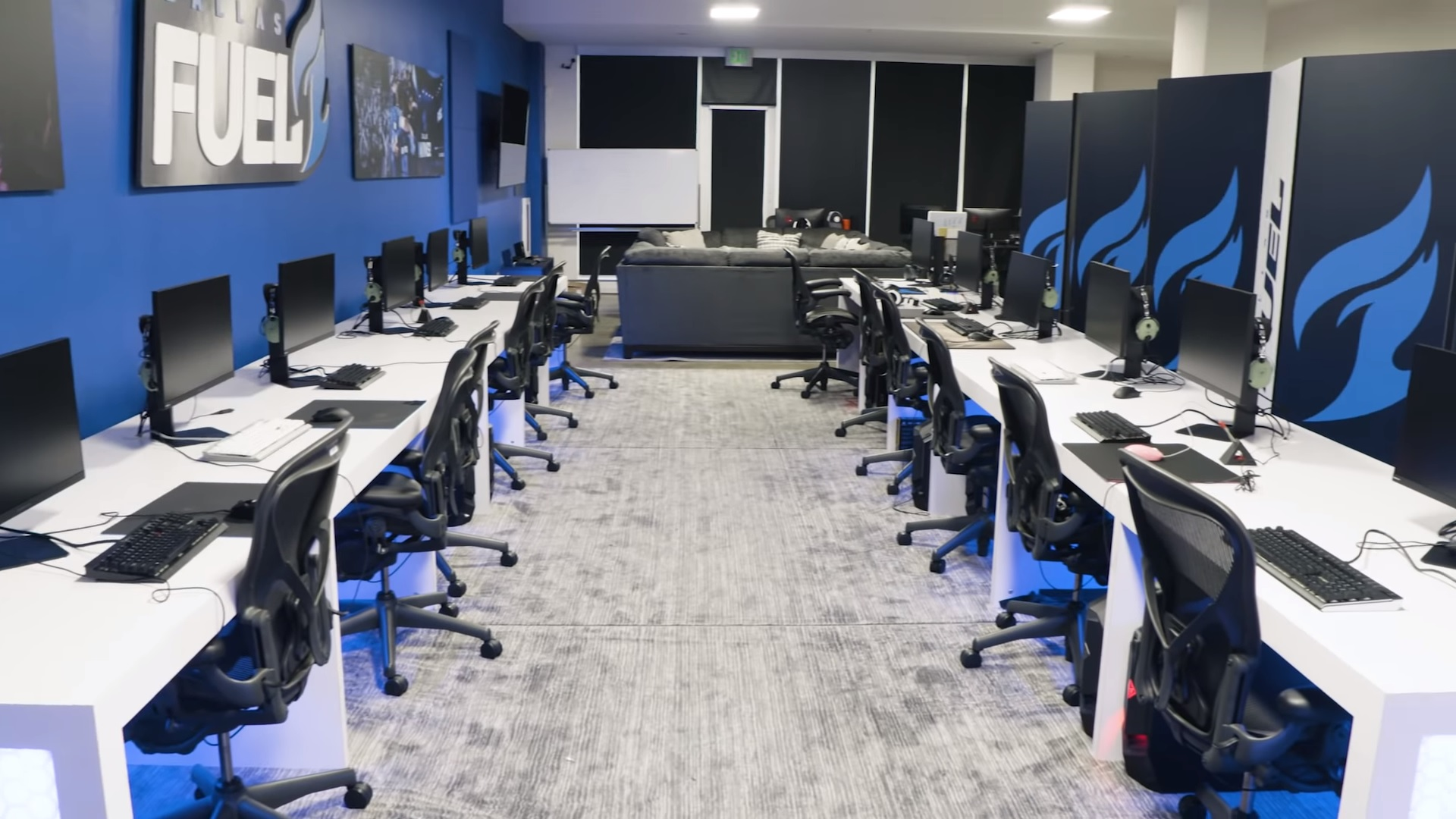
The esports training facilities for the Dallas Fuel

While Overwatch is played in teams of five, Overwatch League teams could have had up to six additional players that could be swapped between maps. A team's membership was locked at the start of the season, but a mid-season signing period allowed teams to bring in new players or trade players between teams. Following the end of the season, teams had about one month to extend current player contracts, bring on players from affiliated Overwatch Contenders teams, or hold private tryout sessions. Subsequently, all unsigned players by the end of this period entered free agency during which players could negotiate with teams to become part of the roster; in the case of when expansion teams were added, there was a month-long period where expansion teams had exclusive negotiating rights before other teams can engage. A team's minimum roster was to be set prior to the season's pre-season matches, about two months prior to season play, but they could expand and change this roster up until a specified date. The league was not region-locked, so teams could use players of any nationality to fill their ranks, as long as the team ownership was based in that city or region. For example, the London Spitfire at the onset of the first season was entirely made up of South Korean players. The only restriction on players is to be of at least 17 years old and to be able to travel internationally.

Overwatch League players, while on a team's contract, were paid an annual salary. As of the 2023 season, a player's salary was a minimum of US$54,249 set by the league. Additionally, the league offered players with health and retirement benefits, as well as housing and training support. Blizzard required team owners to provide the signed players with bonuses representing at least 50% of the team's winnings and revenue. Players could negotiate for larger amounts with their team's owners and larger portion of the bonus revenue-sharing from tournament winnings and other income. For example, in 2017, Jay "sinatraa" Won secured the league's highest salary of $150,000 for his spot on the San Francisco Shock, along with a 50% share of the team's bonuses.

Players were expected to follow a code of conduct set by Blizzard while playing and representing the league, and may have face suspension and fines for violating these, in addition to any penalties the team itself may impose. A noted incident shortly after the league's launch saw Dallas Fuel's Félix "xQc" Lengyel suspended by the league for four games and fined $2,000 for making homophobic comments about another player; the Fuel further suspended him for the remainder of the first stage of play. Following additional conduct violations in the second stage that led to further suspension, xQc was released by the Fuel. Blizzard has since started its online "discipline tracker" in December 2018 to list players who have been temporarily suspended or fined for actions related to their behavior as representatives of the Overwatch League. Players, as part of their benefits, received media training to help with speaking to the press and public about their roles, an issue that has been a problem in previous organized esport systems.

=== Open Division and Contenders ===
Professional teams in the league were given the opportunity to scout for new players through two additional competitive leagues run by Blizzard. The Open Division, first started in June 2017, allowed amateur teams to compete against each other in a structured season. Those that qualify at the end of the season were seeded into a post-season tournament with intra-regional matches. Players that complete all non-playoff games for their team could earn a small amount of credit to Blizzard's digital storefront, while regional winning teams could earn higher prize payouts. The Open division was played across seven different regions: Australia, China, Europe, Korea, North America, Pacific, and South America.

Players or teams can then move up from the Open Division into Overwatch Contenders, which was a minor league to the Overwatch League. Contenders was launched in 2018 to merge existing regional tournaments into a structure to support the Overwatch League. Contenders consisted of several global divisions with a number of teams within each, which may include both professional and amateur players. Contender teams may have been affiliated with an Overwatch League team as an academy team, and up to two players per academy team could be signed to two-way contracts to be moved between their academy team and Overwatch League team.

Contenders was launched in the first half of 2018 with five divisions with 12 teams each: Korea (replacing the Overwatch Apex tournament), China (replacing the Overwatch Premier Series), and Pacific (replacing Overwatch Pacific Championship for other Asian-Pacific countries), and adding in North America and European divisions. Prior to the second 2018 Contenders season, Blizzard added two additional divisions, for Australia and South America, bringing the total to seven. The top eight teams from the Open Division within each region are also invited to Contenders Trials, a weekly promotion and relegation tournament to compete in the following week of Contenders. For its second season in 2019, Blizzard adjusted the format by reducing the number of teams in each region to eight, while dividing the North American region into East and West divisions. Blizzard also added a regional limit of the number of "import players", which are those that live outside the division's region, to a maximum of three. These changes were reverted for the 2020 season.

== History ==
=== Concept ===
The development of Overwatch began in approximately 2013, coinciding with the rising popularity of esports and spectator-driven video gaming, fueled by the accessibility of live streaming platforms. However, the game's development was not dedicated to esports. Lead director Jeff Kaplan, based on Blizzard's past experiences with esports, emphasized the importance of avoiding excessive commitment to esports too early in the game's lifespan. Instead, they chose to closely observe the player community and incorporate any esports-related goals based on their observations. During the beta period of Overwatch, which lasted from late 2015 to mid-2016, Blizzard observed that players were organizing ad hoc competitions and tournaments for the game. This led to Blizzard's consideration of the potential impact if they took charge of formalizing and structuring these competitions. Nate Nanzer, who later became the league's commissioner, noted that with the right approach and investment, they could monetize esports in a manner comparable to traditional sports. Building on this insight, Blizzard laid the groundwork for what would eventually become the Overwatch League. Part of this included introducing competitive features directly into the main Overwatch game, such as ranked play, allowing players to climb a rankings ladder and attract the attention of esports team organizers. In October 2016, Bobby Kotick, the CEO of Activision Blizzard, the parent company of Blizzard, first publicly mentioned the Overwatch League. Kotick highlighted the viewership of user-generated esports content, which had already reached around 100 million, surpassing the viewership of some professional NFL and NBA games. Recognizing this potential, Kotick envisioned the Overwatch League as a means to deliver "professional content" and tap into this extensive viewership.

The Overwatch League was formally announced at BlizzCon in November 2016. During the announcement, Blizzard revealed their plans for the league, which would feature franchised teams employing players to compete in both live arenas and via video streaming platforms. These teams would provide players with salaries, benefits, and opportunities for team and player development. Blizzard's approach to the league differed from traditional esports models that used relegation and promotion systems, such as the one employed in the League of Legends Championship Series. Instead, they opted to follow the American model prevalent in more traditional physical sports. Kotick expressed his belief that the Overwatch League represented an unprecedented venture in esports, emphasizing that nothing of this scale had been attempted before. He also emphasized the importance of adopting a model similar to the NFL in terms of league structure and financial opportunities to attract substantial investments and establish long-lasting franchises within the Overwatch League. He described this approach as a "forever investment".

Blizzard aimed to cover the costs of running the league through traditional revenue streams commonly seen in professional sports leagues, including promotion, advertisements, and physical merchandise. Additionally, owing to the digital nature of esports, Kotick said that they had the opportunity to generate revenue from virtual league-based items offered to fans, as well as increased sales of Overwatch and other games. He also expressed that they could explore more lucrative "over-the-top advertising opportunities that wouldn't exist in traditional sports". Kotick expressed confidence in the league's future financial success. While certain revenue streams might take time to fully materialize, he noted significant traction and enthusiasm from fans before the inaugural season began.

=== Buildout ===
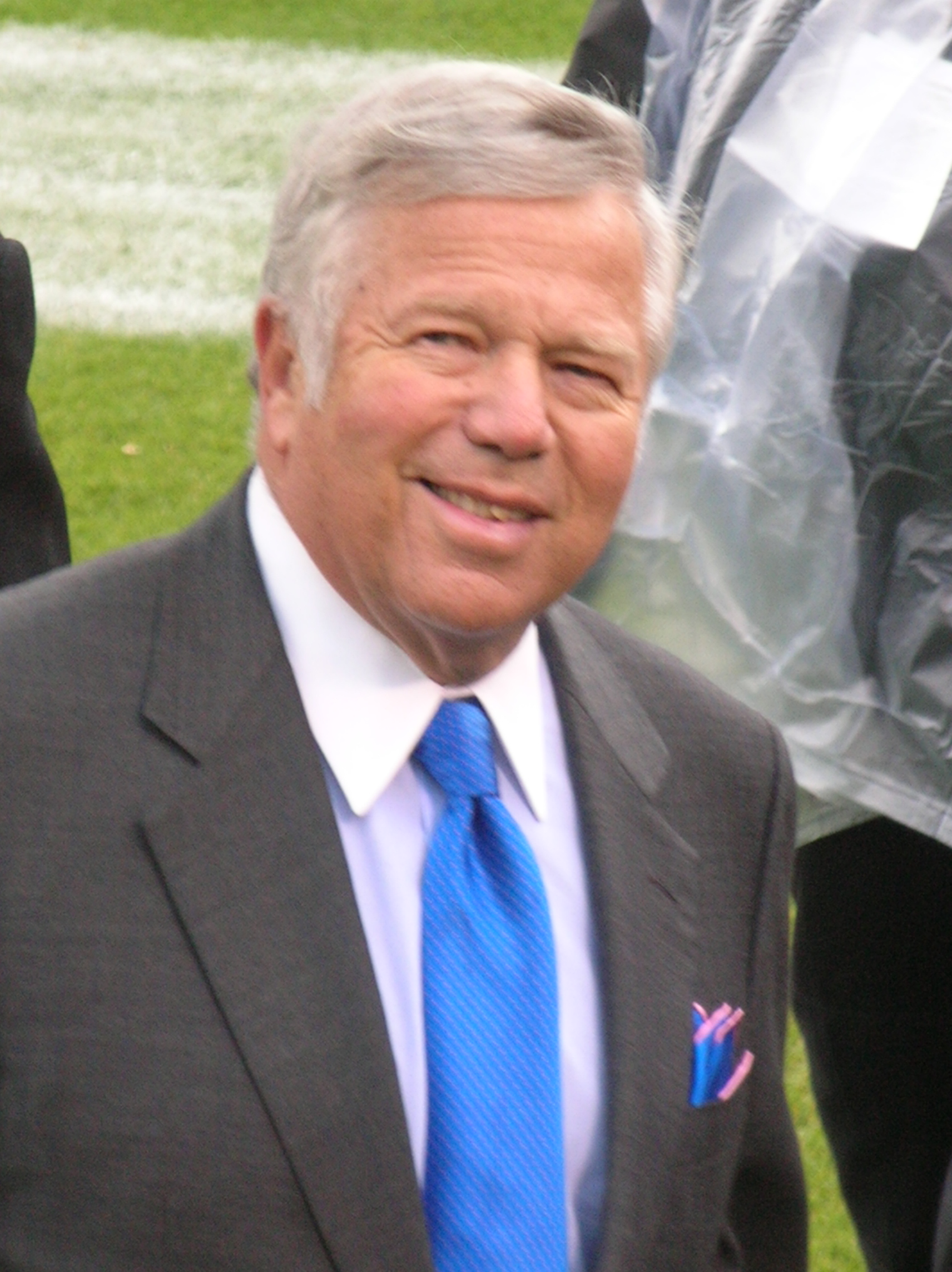
New England Patriots owner Robert Kraft was one of the first businesspeople approached to own an Overwatch League team.

Blizzard sought out potential team owners, with a focus on establishing localized teams tied to specific geographic areas. The company believed that having such local teams would generate greater interest in esports among spectators and potential sponsors, as it would create new opportunities for fans to engage and support their hometown teams. A meeting for prospective team owners took place at BlizzCon 2016, shortly after the league's official announcement. Notable attendees included Robert Kraft, the owner of the New England Patriots, and Stan Kroenke, the owner of the Los Angeles Rams. During the formative stages of the league, Blizzard appointed Steve Bornstein as the company's esports chair. Bornstein, formerly the president of ABC Sports and CEO of NFL Network, assumed a role in shaping the broadcast and presentation of Overwatch League games.

Blizzard anticipated the Overwatch League would have a seven-figure payoff for the winning team at the end of a season. The inaugural season of the league, which was initially intended to be a shortened one, was planned to start in Q3 2017. Subsequent full-length seasons were scheduled to commence in 2018, with the league incorporating half-year long seasonal breaks beginning in Q4 of that year. Prior to the league's official start, Blizzard planned to host a combine, during which players would be invited to try out for guaranteed team contracts.

After the initial announcement in November 2016, Blizzard remained tight-lipped about the Overwatch League for several months, leading to some speculation that the league might be encountering challenges. In May 2017, ESPN reported that the league was indeed facing difficulties in securing franchise deals and attributed these issues to two primary factors. Firstly, the high base cost of starting a franchise, which began at $20 million and could be even higher in more urban markets like New York City and Los Angeles, presented a significant barrier. This entry fee was substantially higher compared to buy-ins for other esports leagues. Secondly, another obstacle was the absence of revenue sharing until 2021. This meant that potential franchise owners could face difficulties in recovering their initial investment costs. However, during this time, Activision Blizzard was actively engaging with potential team owners, opting to withhold extensive announcements until they could present comprehensive details.

The Kraft Group, headed by Robert Kraft, emerged as a key team owner for the league. Kraft had shown previous interest in investing in esports and had met with Bobby Kotick in 2013 when Kotick was exploring investment opportunities in an NFL franchise. During that meeting, Kraft revealed their intent to seek investment in an esports team. Over the next few years, Kraft evaluated various esports competitions but was not entirely comfortable with their grassroots nature. However, when Blizzard introduced the Overwatch League during BlizzCon 2016, it captured Kraft's attention. By March 2017, a deal was successfully struck between Kraft and Activision, securing the first team ownership group for the Overwatch League. Once the Kraft Group committed to supporting a Boston-based team, later named the Boston Uprising, this acted as a catalyst, leading to the formation of six additional teams in the league. The Kraft Group themselves helped to convince some of the other owners to buy into the Overwatch League.

In July 2017, Blizzard revealed the first seven teams and their respective owners for the Overwatch League. Over the following months, additional teams were announced, eventually finalizing a total of twelve teams by mid-December.

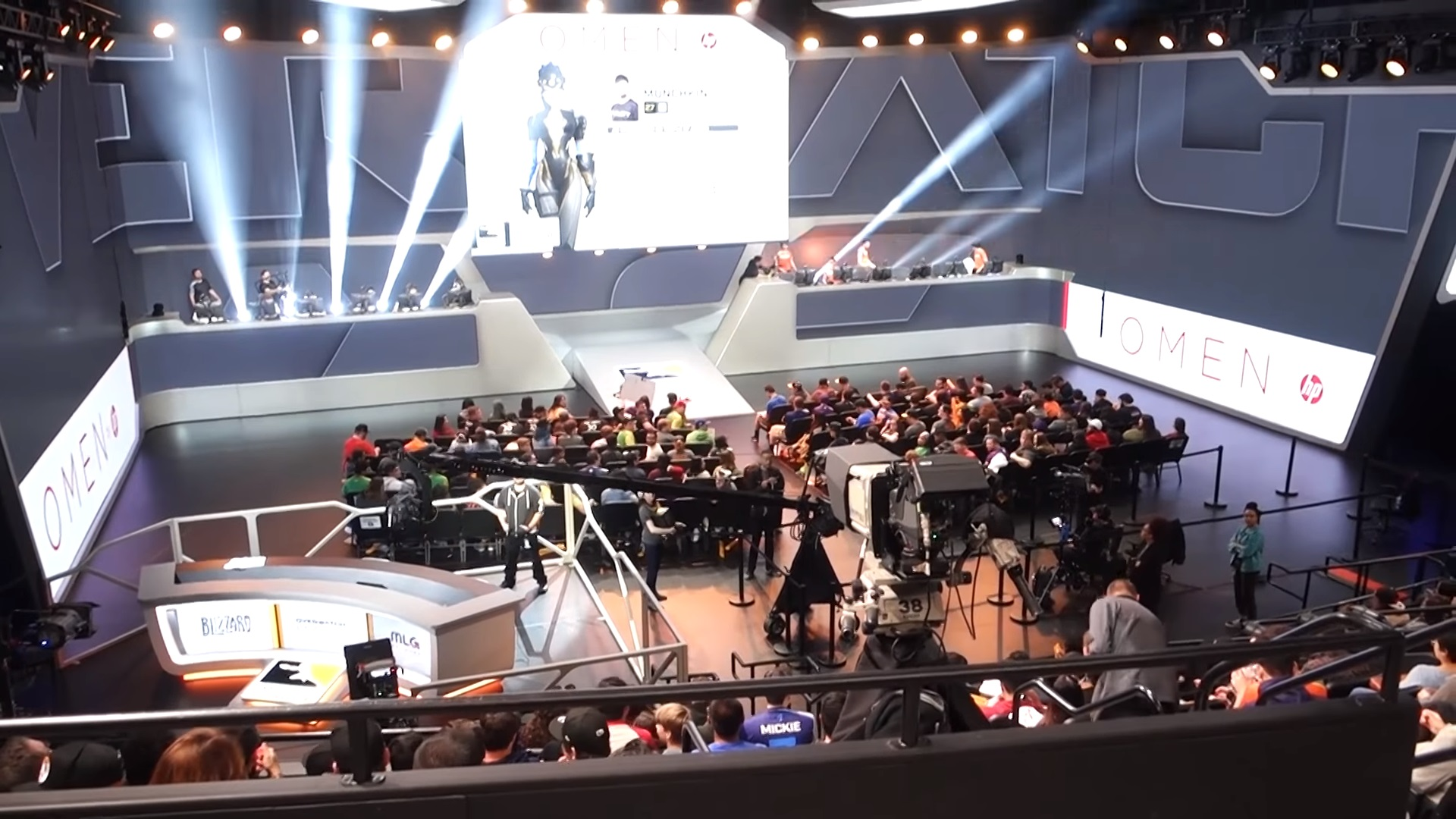
Blizzard Arena hosted nearly every Overwatch League match from 2018 to 2019.

In September 2017, Blizzard announced that they would make permanent use of Studio 1 at The Burbank Studios in Burbank, California, and would convert it into the "Blizzard Arena". Having a dedicated arena served several purposes. Firstly, it aimed to elevate the status of the Overwatch League, presenting it as a highly orchestrated event distinct from other esports tournaments. Additionally, the Blizzard Arena provided an opportunity for players to build stronger connections with their fanbase. Blizzard conducted Overwatch Contenders events in the Blizzard Arena in October 2017. This allowed them to identify areas for improvement and make necessary adjustments ahead of the Overwatch League pre-season, which commenced in December 2017.

=== Launch and expansion ===
To support spectating on broadcast and streaming media, Blizzard implemented cosmetic modifications to the game. Each team received dedicated character skins featuring their team colors, names, and logos. These customized skins were used during matches to easily identify and represent their respective teams. To allow fans outside of the league to show their support, Blizzard introduced a special in-game currency called "OWL Tokens". Players could purchase a character's team skin using OWL Tokens. A percentage of the revenue generated from these purchases was allocated to the teams themselves, providing them with additional financial support. Initially, OWL Tokens were obtainable through an in-game purchase with real currency. However, during the first season, viewers could receive tokens by watching the live broadcast of games through any official Overwatch League channel.

Blizzard also worked to create an AI-based cameraman, capable of following the action of the game and selecting key instant replays. During regular season matches, Blizzard employed a team of approximately 80 to 100 people to manage the game and its broadcast. This team included on-screen hosts, interviewers, play-by-play announcers or "shoutcasters", broadcasting and technical support personnel, and "observers" who used the AI cameraman to monitor matches from various angles. Additionally, there were broadcasting and technical support personnel involved in the production. For broadcasting and commentary, Blizzard enlisted individuals such as Christopher "MonteCristo" Mykles, Erik "DoA" Lonnquist, Matt "Mr. X" Morello, and Mitchell "Uber" Leslie to shoutcast the matches. Blizzard released an Overwatch League app in early January 2018, just before the first season commenced. The app provided schedules, results, highlights, and other essential details about the league's progress.

Preseason play for the inaugural season of the Overwatch League commenced on December 6, 2017. The first regular season game took place on January 10, 2018, with the Los Angeles Valiant defeating the San Francisco Shock. The initial night of play through the English broadcast on Twitch garnered over 415,000 viewers, while never dropping below 285,000 once play started. Blizzard reported that during the first week, over 10 million viewers watched league play across all streaming platforms, and the Blizzard Arena was sold-out throughout the entire week. However, by the end of the season, the league faced challenges in filling seats at Blizzard Arena. According to a former esports executive, it was not uncommon to have only around 100 people in the audience. To address this issue, the company resorted to busing in employees or distributing free tickets to students when high-profile individuals like Kotick or other VIPs were expected to attend. However, this approach was seen as incentivizing undesirable behavior, as it artificially inflated attendance numbers to impress potential team owners and sell them on the promise of a thriving live audience.

As the postseason began, Blizzard and Disney signed a deal to air postseason games on ABC, ESPN, and Disney XD alongside the official Twitch streams, with the partnership extending into the second season. During its first season, the league secured over $200 million in sponsorships and broadcast rights. Major sponsors included Intel, Omen by HP, Toyota, T-Mobile, and Spotify, with most deals valued at over $10 million each. The league ultimately exceeded its 2018 projected revenue of $22 million.

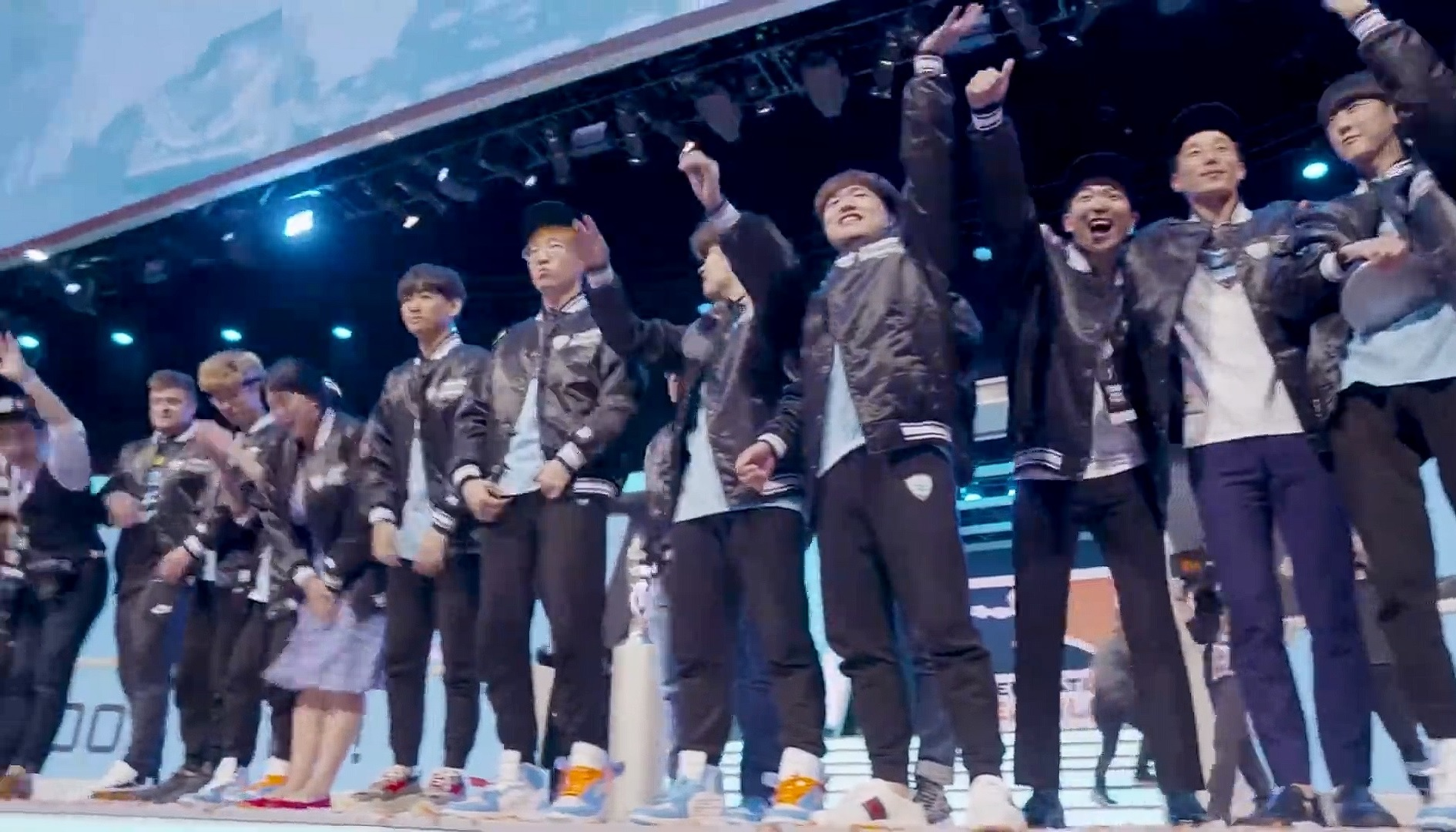
The London Spitfire won the 2018 Grand Finals.

The London Spitfire became the first champions of Overwatch League after defeating the Philadelphia Fusion in the Grand Finals, which took place before 22,000 fans at the Barclays Center in Brooklyn, New York on July 27–28. The finals were watched by more than 10.8 million people, with a viewership comparable to regular season NFL games.

In March 2018, Overwatch League executives began to search for new expansion teams, particularly in international markets, as only one team, the Shanghai Dragons were owned by a foreign corporation at the time. Despite initial skepticism and doubts about the league's potential, Overwatch League's revenue had already exceeded expectations, reaching almost four times its original projection from December 2017 to February 2018. The franchise fee for expansion teams was expected to be higher than the inaugural season, estimated to be between $35 million to $60 million. In September 2018, Blizzard announced the addition of eight new teams for the second season: the Atlanta Reign, Guangzhou Charge, Hangzhou Spark, Toronto Defiant, Paris Eternal, Washington Justice, Vancouver Titans, and Chengdu Hunters. This brought the total number of teams in the league to 20.

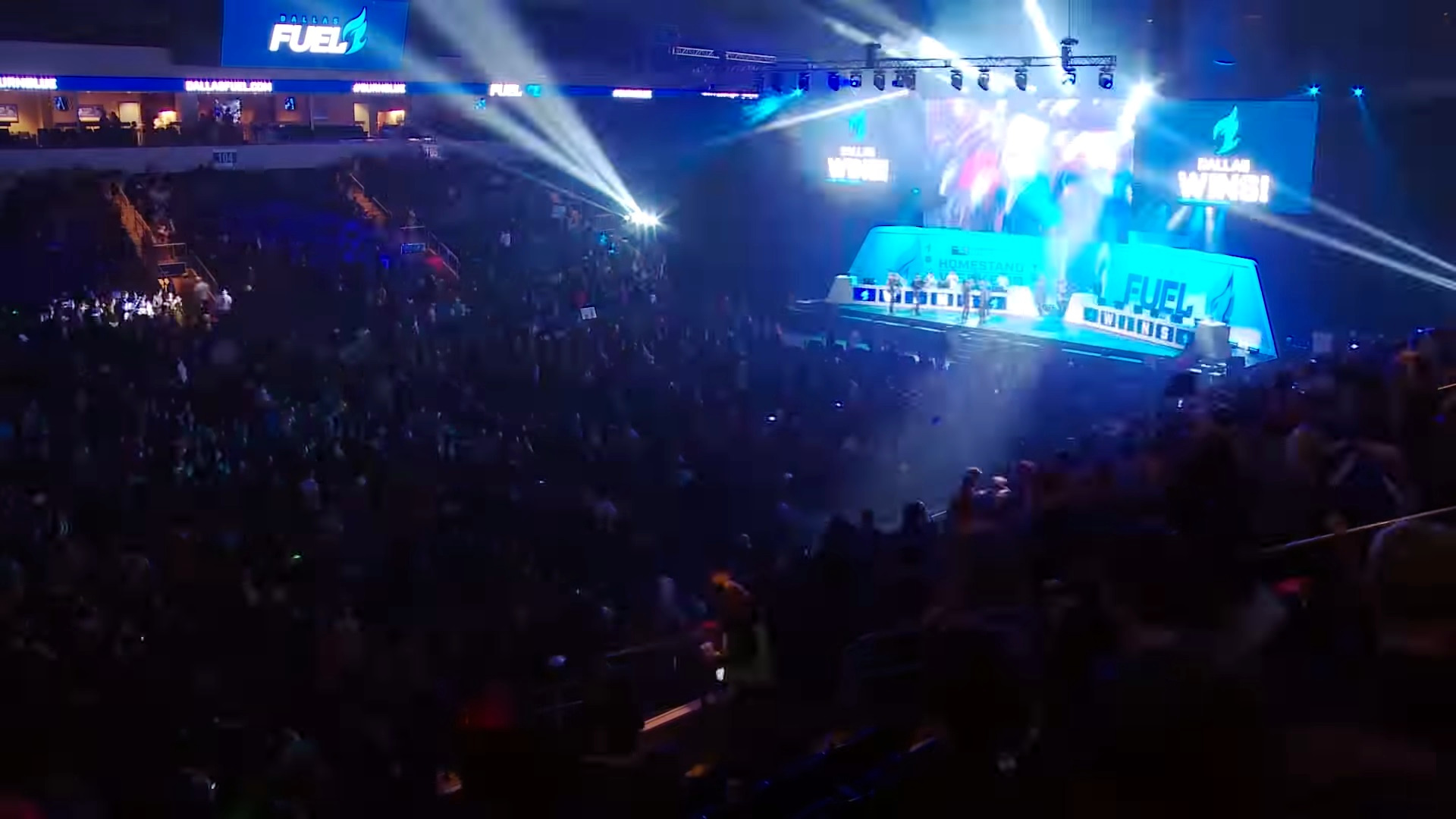
The Dallas Fuel Homestand event held at the Allen Event Center in Allen, Texas, during the 2019 season

For the second season, the regular season was split into four stages, and each team played a total of 28 games, with seven games per stage. This reduced the number of games from 40, which was played in the first season, addressing concerns related to player fatigue and mental health. Most regular season games were played at the Blizzard Arena in Los Angeles, but select Homestand Weekends matches took place at locations in Dallas, Atlanta, and Los Angeles, testing the feasibility of home-and-away games for the following season.

In May 2019, during the middle of the season, league commissioner Nate Nanzer announced that he would be leaving Blizzard to join Epic Games. Pete Vlastelica, who was the CEO and president of Activision Blizzard Esports, took over as the league commissioner following Nanzer's departure. The following month, Immortals Gaming Club (IGC), the parent company of the Los Angeles Valiant, acquired Infinite Esports, the parent company of Houston Outlaws, marking the first sale of any Overwatch League franchise. Since one company may not own more than one OWL franchise, IGC sold the Outlaws to the Beasley Media Group in November 2019.

Beginning in the second season, Fanatics became the league's outfitter, responsible for producing and selling team- and OWL-related clothing and merchandise. Blizzard also signed a multi-year deal with Coca-Cola to become the official non-alcoholic beverage sponsor for various Overwatch esports events, including the Overwatch League, Overwatch Contenders, Open Division, Overwatch World Cup, and BlizzCon. Bud Light became the league's alcoholic beverage sponsor, excluding in China. Furthermore, Xfinity signed on as a sponsor for the 2019 Overwatch League playoffs and Grand Finals. Throughout the second season, the overall global viewership was estimated at 218,000 per minute on average across all games, with a majority of viewers coming from outside the United States.

=== Transition to online play ===
Ahead of the 2020 season, Blizzard signed a three-year deal with YouTube to be the exclusive broadcaster of the Overwatch League. This agreement replaced Twitch as the primary streaming platform for the league's matches. As part of the arrangement, Blizzard also established Google Cloud Platform as the preferred infrastructure provider for the game servers.

In the third season of the Overwatch League, significant changes were made to fully adopt the away-and-home format, allowing games to take place in home arenas for each team. The home arenas were not required to be dedicated esports venues, and some teams collaborated with their local cities to develop such spaces that could also host other sports and entertainment events. For instance, the Philadelphia Fusion's owner, Comcast Spectacor, announced plans to construct the $50 million Fusion Arena by the 2021 season, but during the 2020 season, they scheduled homestand games at the Metropolitan Opera House in Philadelphia and Boardwalk Hall in Atlantic City. Throughout the 2020 season, there were 52 homestand events planned, with each team hosting at least two in their home arenas. Teams that already secured larger arenas were set to host additional regular season events to support the newer teams and arenas in becoming better established. For example, Dallas, Washington, and Guangzhou each had five homestand events scheduled.

The initial schedules were managed by the teams, but Blizzard anticipated taking over scheduling for the 2021 season. Blizzard provided flexibility for teams to plan the 2020 schedule and develop logistics for hosting homestand events, including providing accommodations and practice areas for visiting teams during those weekends. This expansion was coordinated with the Call of Duty League (CDL), a professional esports league founded by Activision in 2020, which also followed the city-based model with many teams owned by the same entities as OWL teams. Both leagues faced similar logistics challenges and coordinated efforts when applicable. Moreover, the previously established divisions were converted into conferences, with each conference having two divisions. The stages were eliminated, and teams continued to play 28 games throughout the season with a planned mid-season All-Star break. Looking forward, League Commissioner Pete Vlastelica expressed interest in potential expansion of the league, with a primary focus on introducing more teams from Europe.

Due to the restrictions imposed in response to the COVID-19 pandemic, the league had to suspend all homestand events and transitioned to online play just a month into the 2020 season. Blizzard Entertainment announced its intention to return to the homestand format as soon as it was safe and logistically feasible. With the closure of entertainment venues in Los Angeles, the Overwatch League production team, including casters and analysts, moved to remote setups, with everyone working from home for the remainder of the season. As part of the adaptation to the new circumstances, the league abandoned the original conferences and instead organized teams into two regions to account for their geographical locations. Teams exclusively competed within their respective regions during the regular season, and inter-regional matches only occurred at the end of the playoffs period. Additionally, the 2020 season introduced mid-season tournaments, held three times throughout the regular season, all still split by region.

According to two owners, the pandemic had an unexpected positive impact on teams as it halted the financial losses incurred from live events. However, the suspension of in-person games also challenged the league's original justification for its existence, leading some teams to contemplate not paying franchise fees in 2020. Two individuals familiar with the situation revealed that Activision Blizzard permitted teams to postpone the fees and provided a $2 million payroll credit. As part of the agreement, teams were required to sign a release stating they would not pursue legal action against the company, as reported by two other sources.

At the end of the 2020 season, commissioner Pete Vlastelica stepped down to take on a new position. He was replaced by Johanna Faries, the commissioner of the Call of Duty League, who became the commissioner of both leagues.

During the fourth season of the Overwatch League, the league continued to adopt regional, online play due to the ongoing COVID-19 pandemic. However, some live events were initially planned to take place in China. The OWL expanded on its tournament format from the previous year, introducing four midseason tournaments throughout the regular season. In July 2021, the league announced that it would host its two postseason events live at different venues: the playoffs would be held at the Esports Stadium Arlington in Arlington, Texas, and the 2021 Grand Finals would take place at the Galen Center in Los Angeles, California. However, due to increasing risks related to COVID-19 and the Delta variant, as well as visa difficulties, these live events were later canceled and shifted to online play. During the season, the OWL also faced sponsor pullbacks, with many of its partners withdrawing their sponsorships following a lawsuit filed by the California Department of Fair Employment and Housing (DFEH) against Activision Blizzard for sexual harassment and discrimination within the company. Sponsors, such as Coca-Cola, Kellogg's, State Farm, and T-Mobile, withdrew their support from the league. By mid-August 2021, the only sponsor present during Overwatch League broadcasts was voice-over-Internet Protocol software company TeamSpeak.

=== Overwatch 2 era ===
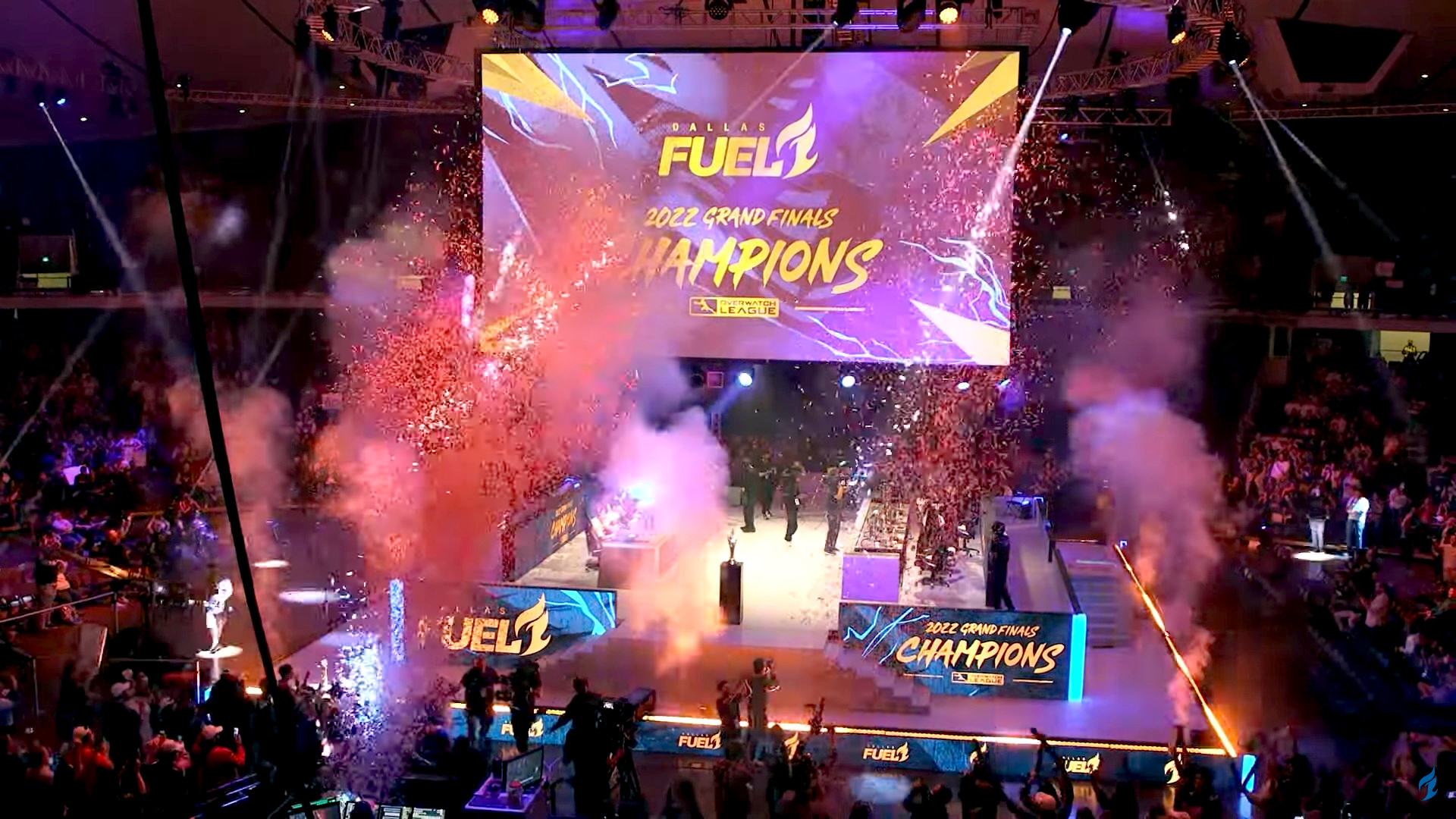
For the first time since 2019, the Grand Finals were played live in 2022.

For the fifth season of the OWL, the league played on an early release of Overwatch 2. The season, which began in early May 2022, faced several challenges on multiple fronts. Notably, there were no known sponsors for the season as of June 9, 2022. Moreover, the league underwent significant changes in its leadership during this time, as five top executives left Activision Blizzard Esports or transitioned to other departments since the start of the season. Furthermore, the company made adjustments to its operations, deciding to outsource its broadcast and event production to a third party. During the midseason tournaments, viewership numbers experienced a significant decrease compared to the previous season, with a reduction of up to 40.5%. However, after the official release of Overwatch 2 on October 5, 2022, the league saw a surge in viewership. The 2022 playoffs reached a live average minute audience of 250,000, surpassing previous viewership records from when the league was broadcast on Twitch in 2018 and 2019. The 2022 Grand Finals were held live at the Anaheim Convention Center in Anaheim, California, marking the first time that the Grand Finals were held live since 2019. In terms of sponsorships, the league secured a deal with Butterfinger for the playoffs, marking their first new sponsorship since 2021.

During the offseason leading up to the 2023 season, the league faced challenges with uncertainties about its future, as broken partnership with NetEase caused disruptions in the East Region as certain Blizzard games, including Overwatch 2, had their services suspended in China. To adapt to this, in the East Region, an "open ecosystem" approach was implemented, allowing Overwatch Contenders teams to compete alongside Overwatch League teams. A preseason pro-am tournament was also held in the West Region, where Overwatch Contenders teams competed against established OWL teams. The regular season was divided into two stages, Spring and Summer, and featured only one midseason tournament. Several teams underwent significant changes in branding and regions during this offseason as well. The Paris Eternal relocated to Las Vegas and rebranded as the Vegas Eternal, making them the first team in the league to switch cities. Similarly, the Philadelphia Fusion shifted their base to Seoul and adopted a new identity as the Seoul Infernal. Not all teams remained intact, as the Chengdu Hunters disbanded.

In January 2023, in an effort to address operating costs and viewership challenges, Overwatch League teams collectively initiated a bargaining process. They enlisted the representation of Sheridans, a British law firm, to negotiate with Activision Blizzard. This collective bargaining process led to an agreement between OverActive Media, the owner of the Toronto Defiant, and the Overwatch League. As part of this agreement, the Toronto Defiant signed a sponsorship deal with the league, and the Overwatch League agreed to waive the outstanding franchise fees owed by all teams.

=== Termination ===
On July 19, 2023, Activision-Blizzard released its second-quarter earnings report. According to the report, following the conclusion of the 2023 season, franchise owners voted on an updated operating agreement. Should the teams opt not to continue under the updated agreement, a termination fee of $6 million would be payable to each participating team entity, amounting to a total fee of approximately $114 million. On November 8, 2023, an OWL spokesperson confirmed that Blizzard would be transitioning away from its current model and would be working on building a new framework for competitive Overwatch, as a two-thirds majority of OWL franchisees voted to depart from the league. Reports suggested that the league might be operated by a third-party tournament organizer in 2024. On January 23, 2024, Blizzard announced that the Overwatch League was officially folded; on the same day, they announced a multi-year deal with ESL FACEIT Group and WDG Esports to create the Overwatch Champions Series (OWCS) to replace the OWL.

== Teams ==
The league launched in 2018 with twelve teams, each based in a global city. Eight additional teams were added in the league's 2019 season. Prior to the 2020 season, the teams were divided between two divisions: the Atlantic Division with the American East Coast, Eastern Canadian and European teams, and the Pacific Division with the American West Coast, Western Canadian and Asian teams. With the 2020 season, the two divisions were elevated to conferences, keeping the same team distributions, but with now two divisions within each conference. Additionally, teams began playing in home/away games, with each team having one or more venues to host homestand weekends. However, due to the emergence of the COVID-19 pandemic, all live matches were cancelled near the beginning of the 2020 season, and teams were divided into regions. Below was the region split as of the 2023 season.

East Region West Region

Team	Location	Joined	Owner	Academy team
East Region
Dallas Fuel	(United States) Dallas	2018	OpTic Gaming	Team Envy (inactive)
Guangzhou Charge	(China) Guangzhou	2019	Nenking Group	Ultra Prime Academy (inactive)
Hangzhou Spark	(China) Hangzhou	2019	Bilibili	Bilibili Gaming (inactive)
Seoul Dynasty	(South Korea) Seoul	2018	Gen.G Esports	Gen.G Global Academy
Seoul Infernal	(South Korea) Seoul	2018	Comcast Spectacor	Fusion University (inactive), T1 (inactive)
Shanghai Dragons	(China) Shanghai	2018	NetEase	Team CC (inactive)
West Region
Atlanta Reign	(United States) Atlanta	2019	Atlanta Esports Ventures	ATL Academy (inactive)
Boston Uprising	(United States) Boston	2018	Kraft Group	Uprising Academy (inactive)
Florida Mayhem	(United States) Miami–Orlando	2018	Misfits Gaming	Mayhem Academy (inactive)
Houston Outlaws	(United States) Houston	2018	Beasley Media Group	GG Esports Academy (inactive)
London Spitfire	(United Kingdom) London	2018	Cloud9	British Hurricane (inactive)
Los Angeles Gladiators	(United States) Los Angeles	2018	Kroenke Sports & Entertainment	Gladiators Legion (inactive)
Los Angeles Valiant	(United States) Los Angeles	2018	Immortals Gaming Club	None
New York Excelsior	(United States) New York City	2018	NYXL	NYXL Academy
San Francisco Shock	(United States) San Francisco	2018	NRG Esports	O2 Blast
Toronto Defiant	(Canada) Toronto	2019	OverActive Media	Montreal Rebellion (inactive)
Vancouver Titans	(Canada) Vancouver	2019	Canucks Sports & Entertainment	None
Vegas Eternal	(United States) Las Vegas	2019	DM-Esports	Eternal Academy (inactive)
Washington Justice	(United States) Washington, D.C.	2019	Washington Esports Ventures	None

== League championships ==
As of the 2023 season, 20 different teams have competed in the league, with five having won at least one Grand Finals title.

Season	Champions	Score	Runners-up
2018 (Note: The 2018 Grand Finals was a best-of-three series; London won 3–1 in the first match and 3–0 in the second.)	London Spitfire	2–0	Philadelphia Fusion
2019	San Francisco Shock	4–0	Vancouver Titans
2020	San Francisco Shock	4–2	Seoul Dynasty
2021	Shanghai Dragons	4–0	Atlanta Reign
2022	Dallas Fuel	4–3	San Francisco Shock
2023	Florida Mayhem	4–0	Houston Outlaws

== Broadcasting ==
Shortly prior to the beginning of the 2018 regular season, Blizzard reached a two-year deal with Twitch to be the main streaming broadcaster of the Overwatch League outside of China, reported to be valued at $90 million. The service carried streams in English, French, and Korean, while users who linked their Twitch account to their Battle.net account would also be eligible for chances to receive in-game items for Overwatch while watching broadcasts. A subscription service known as the "All-Access Pass" also allowed users access to private streams and chat rooms with players, coaches, league officials and announcers, in-game currency to purchase team skins, emotes for use on Twitch chats, and discounts at Blizzard's store. This feature was expanded for the 2019 season to include the ability for viewers to use the "command center" app introduced during the 2018 Overwatch World Cup, to be able to view matches from different camera angles in real-time. The league also posted highlights on Twitter starting with the first season's All-Star Weekend and continuing into the second season, and also produced a weekly pre-game show called Watchpoint.

On July 11, 2018, Blizzard also announced a U.S. television deal with ESPN through the 2019 season, under which coverage of the 2018 playoffs would be simulcast across ESPN networks, including the semi-finals airing across ESPN2, ESPNews, and Disney–ABC Television Group sister channel Disney XD, the first night of the final airing on the main ESPN network (marking its first-ever primetime broadcast of an esports event), continuing on Disney XD the next day, and a highlights package the following Sunday on ABC. The arrangement continued into the 2019 season, with Disney XD adding regular-season broadcasts, and ABC adding broadcast television simulcasts of the Stage 1 and Stage 2 finals, and the all-star event. This partnership included broadcasting rights to the Overwatch World Cup as well. ESPN's sister Canadian network TSN also carried broadcasts on its platforms, including television encores of matches involving the league's new Canadian franchises.

German sports channel Sport1, which broadcasts to Switzerland and Austria in addition to Germany, made a two-year deal with Blizzard games live starting in the second season, partnering to form a new eSports1 sister channel.

In early 2020, YouTube reached a three-year exclusive deal to serve as broadcaster for all Activision Blizzard esports events, including the Overwatch League, Call of Duty League, and Hearthstone, replacing Twitch. The deal was reported to be valued at $160 million. Alongside the agreement, Activision Blizzard also reached an agreement to use Google Cloud Platform as its preferred infrastructure provider for its game servers. After the expiration of the deal, the Overwatch League season would continue to be exclusively broadcast on YouTube.

== Reception ==
Some commentators observed that of the more than 100 players selected for teams for the first season, none of them were female. Some noted the absence of Kim "Geguri" Se-yeon, a teenage South Korean player who is recognized as one of the highest-skilled Zarya players and who was the first female player to play in the Overwatch APEX league. During the press day event prior to the start of the season, teams acknowledged they had considered signing on Geguri but noted issues with such an action. The Houston Outlaws said that there would have been a language barrier issue with her potential teammates, and complications related to co-ed housing for teams. The team also claimed that if they had brought her on board, there would have been issues from external commentators about whether it was a press stunt or an otherwise legitimate reason, and the nature of this legitimacy would shadow her career. Other teams like the London Spitfire and the New York Excelsior had looked to Geguri as a free agent but in the end desired to work from an established set of players that had already worked in leagues in the past. Team owners recognized that they want to make the player roster more diverse, but this in part requires making the community around Overwatch less toxic and more inviting. Nanzer also said he would like to see further diversity in players in the league, but was aware that there are cultures where there is a social stigma against professional video game players that can be a barrier to achieve this. By mid-February, during the Season 1 free agency window, Geguri was signed by the Shanghai Dragons, making her the first female player in the league.

Additional concerns were raised following several league-issued fines and suspensions issued against a number of players based on their conduct. Journalists found that some players carried over the toxic nature from their days as YouTube or Twitch broadcasters, in which players would often routinely ridicule their opponents; many of the fines and suspensions follow from similar behavior displayed at the league level. The Overwatch player base outside of the league has also had issues of toxicity, which Blizzard has been trying to handle through better reporting tools. In addition to requiring the league players to follow the code of conduct, Blizzard is also watching how these players behave on off-league broadcasts, and would fine players if they engage in toxic or inappropriate behavior even if not part of a league session, as well as publicizing when the league takes such actions. Some of this poor behavior had concerned at least one of the league's sponsors, HP, since the behavior becomes associated with their brand, though such problems were not unique to esports, according to HP product manager John Ludwig.

After the conclusion of the first stage of the inaugural season, ESPN reported that the revenue projections for the league has exceeded its expectations, with some insiders claiming that the league's revenue was four times greater than initially planned; this was in part through its Twitch streaming deal and new advertisers, such as Toyota and T-Mobile, that came on board a few weeks into play. Due to the success of the first season of the Overwatch League, Fortune named commissioner Nate Nanzer as one of their "40 Under 40" in 2018.

Entering the third season, concern had been raised on the stress of the league on its players. Fifty players had dropped from the league during the first two years, with several of them citing the stress the league places on them and mental health issues.

== Litigation ==
In July 2017, a trademark dispute arose when Major League Baseball (MLB) association expressed concerns regarding the logo that Blizzard had registered for the Overwatch League. MLB argued that Blizzard's logo bore similarities to their own, raising the potential for confusion among consumers. However, following the initial complaint, no further filings were made by Major League Baseball within the required dispute period. This suggested that either MLB decided to drop the dispute, or an undisclosed understanding was reached between MLB and the Overwatch League, allowing the league to continue using the logo.

In July 2021, Dot Esports reported that the United States Department of Justice (DOJ) was investigating the Overwatch League in regards to their team soft cap on players' salaries. In contrast to professional sports leagues like the NFL, where the use of player unions allows the league to implement salary caps under the Supreme Court ruling in Amalgamated Meat Cutters v. Jewel Tea Co., the Overwatch League currently lacks such unions, which would make salary caps potentially a violation of the Sherman Antitrust Act of 1890. The league soft cap in 2020 was $1.6 million, and while a team could have salaries over that amount, they would be taxed as a luxury tax and would be considered detrimental. In October 2021, Sports Business Journal reported that the OWL would be eliminating the luxury tax and maximum salary caps. A settlement between the two parties was proposed, but according to a report by former ESPN writer Jacob Wolf in late 2022, Activision Blizzard refused to terms regarding particular requests that would endure after the proposed acquisition of Activision Blizzard by Microsoft. The Department of Justice filed a lawsuit, and Activision Blizzard agreed to settle the suit in April 2023, with provisions that would prohibit it from implementing similar measures in the future in the Overwatch League, the Call of Duty League, or any other esports league it operates.

== Legacy ==
Activision Blizzard used the Overwatch League model to establish the Call of Duty League in 2019. While the Call of Duty League was to have its inaugural season in 2020 with the same planned home/away format that the Overwatch League was planning the use in its third season, the COVID-19 pandemic forced the Call of Duty League to switch to a fully online format. The league was a central plot element in the seventeenth season episode "Brave N00b World" of American Dad! which was first broadcast in May 2020.
