= 2020 Overwatch League Grand Finals =

2020 Overwatch League championship match

2020 OWL Grand Finals
| Seoul Dynasty | San Francisco Shock |
| 2 | 4 |
- Date: October 10, 2020
- Venue: Online
- Purse: $2.25 million
- MVP: Kwon "Striker" Nam-joo

Live Broadcast
- Broadcast(s): YouTube; Bilibili; NetEase CC; Huya

The 2020 Overwatch League Grand Finals was the third championship match of the Overwatch League (OWL), which took place on October 10, 2020. The series was the conclusion of the 2020 Overwatch League playoffs and was played between the San Francisco Shock and Seoul Dynasty.

San Francisco qualified for the season playoffs as the second seed in the North America region, while Seoul qualified as the fourth seed in the Asia Region. After claiming the top North America seed in the Grand Finals Bracket, San Francisco defeated the Seoul Dynasty and Shanghai Dragons to reach the Grand Finals match. Seoul claimed the second Asia seed in the Grand Finals Bracket, and after losing to San Francisco in the first round, they defeated the Philadelphia Fusion and Shanghai Dragons to reach the Grand Finals match.

In the Grand Finals match, the Shock defeated the Dynasty by a score of 4–2 to win their second OWL championship.

== Road to the Grand Finals ==
The Grand Finals are the post-season championship series of the Overwatch League (OWL), a professional international esports league; the teams in the Grand Finals match will compete for a $2.25 million prize pool, where the winners will receive $1.5 million. The 2020 season was the third season in OWL history and consisted of twenty teams. Due to the COVID-19 pandemic, many changes to the season were made, including switching to online matches, reworking the teams' distributions into two regions – North America and Asia, cancelling certain mid-season events, and introducing mid-season tournaments. The playoffs were contested by twelve teams – eight from the North America region and four from the Asia region. The top two teams from each region's respective playoff bracket qualified for the Grand Finals bracket, where the final two teams in the Grand Finals bracket will play in the Grand Finals match.

The finalists, San Francisco and Seoul, finished the 2020 regular season with records of 25–3 and 12–12, respectively. The Shock claimed the second seed of the North America season playoffs, while the Dynasty were awarded the fourth seed of the Asia season playoffs. The two teams faced each other one time in 2020 season – in the first round of the Grand Finals bracket; the Shock won the match 3–2. The Shock are the defending OWL champions, while the 2019 runners-up Vancouver Titans failed to qualify for the 2020 playoffs after being eliminated in the play-in tournament.

=== Seoul Dynasty ===
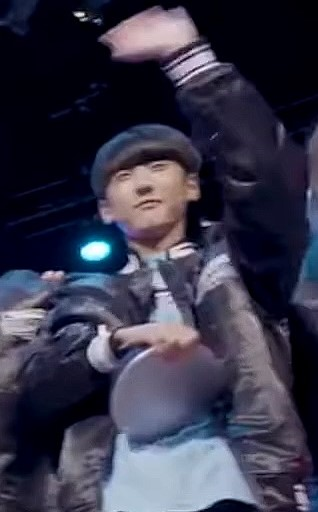
Dynasty damage player Profit.

The Dynasty entered the league in 2018 as one of the twelve founding franchises. In the offseason preceding the 2020 season, the team made many organization changes, including parting ways with head coach Kim "KDG" Dong-gun and promoting assistant coach Park "changoon" Chang-geun to head coach. Seoul made many roster changes as well. Additions to the team included tank Hong "Gesture" Jae-hee, DPS Park "Profit" Joon-yeong, support Kim "Creative" Young-wan, and support Choi "Bdosin" Seung-tae, while departures included support Lee "Jecse" Seung-soo, support Lee "Highly" Sung-hyeok, support Ryu "ryujehong" Je-hong, and off-tank Kim "zunba" Joon-hyeok.

Seoul started their season on March 28 with a 3–0 sweep over the Los Angeles Valiant. The team was handed their first loss on April 26 to bring their record to 3–1 prior to the May Melee. On May 14, the team signed former Vancouver Titans main support Kim "SLIME" Seong-joon. The Dynasty struggled to find wins in the regular season portion of the May Melee, finishing last in the Asia seeding with a 1–3 record for May; however, they made it to the finals but were defeated by the Shanghai Dragons. Despite their strong performance in the tournament, Seoul again struggled to win regular season games, losing three straight until a 3–0 sweep over the Chengdu Hunters, giving them the fifth seed in the Summer Showdown tournament. Seoul reached the semifinals of the tournament but were, again, eliminated by the Dragons. Seoul's struggles continued, finishing last in the Countdown Cup seeding with an 0–4 record. On August 6, two days prior to the Countdown Cup tournament, Seoul signed off-tank Lim "Toyou" Hyun-woo to a two-way contract. The team fell to the Hangzhou Spark in the first round of the Countdown Cup. The Dynasty finished the season strong, winning four of their last five final matches to finish the season with 9 wins, 3 bonus wins from midseason tournaments, and 12 losses, giving them an effective regular season record of 12–12 and the fifth seed in the Asia region postseason. After qualifying for a first-round bye in the Asia region play-in tournament, Seoul defeated the Spark in the play-in tournament to claim the fourth seed in the Asia playoffs bracket.

The Dynasty swept the second-seeded Guangzhou Charge, 3–0, on September 6 in the first round of Asia playoffs bracket. The win advanced Seoul to the upper bracket finals, where they fell by a 2–3 score to the top-seeded Dragons, sending them to the lower bracket finals. The team rebounded from the loss by handing the third-seeded New York Excelsior a 3–0 sweep in the lower bracket finals and claiming the second Asia seed in the Grand Finals bracket.

Seoul faced the North America's top-seeded San Francisco Shock bracket's first round on October 8. After falling to a quick 0–2 deficit, the Dynasty evened up the score, winning the following two maps; however, they were unable to win the final map and fell by a score of 2–3. Falling to the lower bracket, the Dynasty responded to the loss by claiming a 3–0 sweep over North America's second-seeded Philadelphia Fusion. The win advanced the team to the lower bracket finals, where they took on Asia's top-seeded Shanghai Dragons. Despite having not won against the Dragons in any of their previous playoff matches of the season, Seoul won the match by a score of 3–2 to advance to the Grand Finals match.

=== San Francisco Shock ===
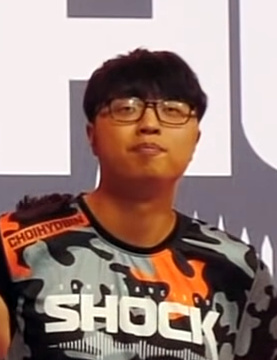
Shock tank ChoiHyoBin.

San Francisco entered the league in 2018 as one of the twelve founding franchises. After winning the 2019 Overwatch League Grand Finals, the Shock elected not to re-sign off-tank Andreas "Nevix" Karlsson and picked up sniper specialist Lee "ANS" Seon-chang in the offseason.

The Shock's first match of the 2020 regular season resulted in a 3–1 win over the Dallas Fuel. After starting the season with a 5–2 record, 2019 Most Valuable Player Jay "sinatraa" Won retired from competitive Overwatch to compete in Valorant. Three weeks later, the Shock transferred DPS Park "Architect" Min-ho to the Hangzhou Spark and signed former Vancouver Titans flex support Lee "Twilight" Jooseok. After going undefeated in the regular season for the month of May, the Shock claimed the top seed in the May Melee, where they ultimately defeated the Florida Mayhem in the finals to win the tournament title. Having lost not a match since March, the Shock won all of their regular season matches in June to claim the top seed in the Summer Showdown; however, the team fell to the Paris Eternal in the finals. After the loss, the Shock signed DPS Sean Taiyo "Ta1yo" Henderson from Overwatch Contenders team Third Impact. The Shock continued their regular season win streak throughout July and claimed the top seed in the Countdown Cup, where they won their second midseason tournament title after defeating the Philadelphia Fusion. In their first match after the title win, the Shock again faced the Fusion and were swept 3–0, ending their regular season win streak and locking them into the second seed of the North America playoffs bracket. The team finished the regular season with 18 wins, 7 bonus wins from midseason tournaments, and 3 losses, giving them an effective regular season record of 25–3. Lee "Ans" Seon-Chang, Choi "Choihyobin" Hyo-Bin, and Park "Viol2t" Min-Ki were awarded the Role Star commendation for DPS, and support, respectively. Choihyobin and Viol2t were also nominated for the league's most valuable player award.

San Francisco faced the eighth-seeded Washington Justice on September 5 in the first round of the North America playoffs bracket, and after falling 0–2 in the match, the Shock won three straight maps to move on to the second round of the upper bracket. The team next defeated the seventh-seeded Atlanta Reign by a score of 3–1. Moving on to the upper bracket finals, the Shock faced the top-seeded Philadelphia Fusion. Despite keeping the maps close, the Shock came out with a 3–1 victory and advanced to the Grand Finals bracket.

As the top North America seed in the Grand Finals bracket, the Shock faced Asia's second-seeded Seoul Dynasty in the bracket's first round on October 8. After the Shock came out with a quick 2–0 lead, the Dynasty evened up the score, winning the following two maps; however, San Francisco won the final map of the match and moved on to the Upper Bracket finals. The team faced Asia's top-seeded Shanghai Dragons in the upper finals, where, again, the Shock started the match with a 2–0 lead, but the Dragons tied up the series after four maps. The Shock won the final map of the match to advance to the Grand Finals match.

=== Summary of results ===
Asia qualified playoff teams
| Seed | Team | Conference | Record | MR | MD |
|---|---|---|---|---|---|
| 1 | Shanghai Dragons | PAC | 27–2 | 59–15–1 | +44 |
| 2 | Guangzhou Charge | PAC | 18–7 | 44–39–1 | +5 |
| 3 | New York Excelsior | ATL | 16–8 | 50–30–2 | +20 |
| 4 | Seoul Dynasty | PAC | 12–12 | 33–47–1 | -14 |

North America qualified playoff teams
| Seed | Team | Conference | Record | MR | MD |
|---|---|---|---|---|---|
| 1 | Philadelphia Fusion | ATL | 24–2 | 59–19–0 | +40 |
| 2 | San Francisco Shock | PAC | 25–3 | 56–17–2 | +39 |
| 3 | Paris Eternal | ATL | 18–6 | 47–30–0 | +17 |
| 4 | Florida Mayhem | ATL | 17–7 | 48–30–0 | +18 |
| 5 | Los Angeles Valiant | PAC | 12–10 | 41–41–0 | ±0 |
| 6 | Los Angeles Gladiators | PAC | 11–10 | 43–39–5 | +4 |
| 7 | Atlanta Reign | ATL | 10–11 | 43–35–0 | +8 |
| 8 | Washington Justice | ATL | 4–17 | 21–54–1 | -33 |

Seoul Dynasty playoffs matches
| Round | Opponent | Score |
|---|---|---|
| A Upper Round 1 | (2) Guangzhou Charge | 3–0 |
| A Upper Final | (1) Shanghai Dragons | 2–3 |
| A Lower Final | (3) New York Excelsior | 3–0 |
| GF Upper Round 1 | (NA1) San Francisco Shock | 2–3 |
| GF Lower Round 1 | (NA2) Philadelphia Fusion | 3–0 |
| GF Lower Final | (A1) Shanghai Dragons | 3–2 |

San Francisco Shock playoffs matches
| Round | Opponent | Score |
|---|---|---|
| NA Upper Round 1 | (8) Washington Justice | 3–2 |
| NA Upper Round 2 | (7) Atlanta Reign | 3–1 |
| NA Upper Final | (1) Philadelphia Fusion | 3–1 |
| GF Upper Round 1 | (A2) Seoul Dynasty | 3–2 |
| GF Upper Final | (A1) Shanghai Dragons | 3–2 |

== Broadcast and viewership ==
For the first time, the Grand Finals were not broadcast on linear TV. The match was live-streamed on the digital platforms YouTube, Bilibili, Huya, and NetEase CC. Viewership on YouTube peaked at 180 thousand concurrent viewers, while the average minute audience in China was 1.39 million. Globally, the match saw an average viewership of 1.55 million, a 38% increase over the 2019 Grand Finals, making it the most watched match in OWL history.

== Match summary ==
| Grand Finals | October 10 | Seoul Dynasty | 2 | – | 4 | San Francisco Shock | Online |
| | 9:00 am EDT (13:00 UTC) | Details | | | | | |
| | | 0 | Oasis | | | 2 | |
| | | 2 | King's Row | | | 3 | |
| | | 2 | Hanamura | | | 1 | |
| | | 3 | Watchpoint: Gibraltar | | | 0 | |
| | | 0 | Busan | | | 2 | |
| | | 1 | Hollywood | | | 2 | |

== Rosters ==
=== Seoul Dynasty ===
2020 Seoul Dynasty roster
Players
Coaches

| Role | No. | Handle | Name | Nationality |
|---|---|---|---|---|
| Damage | 1 | FITS | Kim Dong-eun | South Korea |
| Damage | 21 | ILLICIT | Park Jae-min | South Korea |
| Damage | 13 | Profit | Park Joon-yeong | South Korea |
| Tank | 7 | Gesture | Hong Jae-hee | South Korea |
| Tank | 11 | Marve1 | Hwang Min-seo | South Korea |
| Tank | 99 | Michelle | Choi Min-hyuk | South Korea |
| Tank | 6 | Toyou (2W) | Lim Hyun-woo | South Korea |
| Support | 10 | Bdosin | Choi Seung-tae | South Korea |
| Support | 20 | Creative | Kim Young-wan | South Korea |
| Support | 4 | tobi | Yang Jin-mo | South Korea |
| Support | 28 | SLIME | Kim Sung-jun | South Korea |

Head coach

- Park "changoon" Chang-geun

Legend:
- (I) Inactive
- (S) Suspended
- (2W) Two-way player
- Substitute
- (injured) Injury / Illness

Latest roster transaction: August 6, 2020.

=== San Francisco Shock ===
2020 San Francisco Shock roster
Players
Coaches

| Role | No. | Handle | Name | Nationality |
|---|---|---|---|---|
| Damage | 7 | Striker | Kwon Nam-joo | South Korea |
| Damage | 27 | Rascal | Kim Dong-jun | South Korea |
| Damage | 47 | ta1yo | Henderson, Sean Taiyo | Japan |
| Damage | 10 | ANS | Lee Seon-chang | South Korea |
| Tank | 1 | super | DeLisi, Matthew | United States |
| Tank | 5 | smurf | Yoo Myeong-hwan | South Korea |
| Tank | 11 | ChoiHyoBin | Choi Hyo-bin | South Korea |
| Support | 64 | Moth | Espe, Grant | United States |
| Support | 17 | Viol2t | Park Min-ki | South Korea |
| Support | 13 | Twilight | Lee Joo-seok | South Korea |

Head coach

- Park "Crusty" Dae-hee

Legend:
- (I) Inactive
- (S) Suspended
- (2W) Two-way player
- Substitute
- (injured) Injury / Illness

Latest roster transaction: July 21, 2020.
