= Geguri =

South Korean esports player

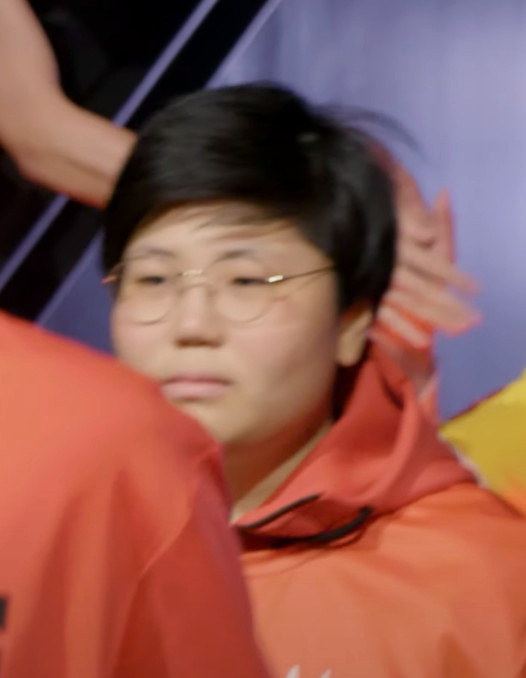
- Kim in 2018

Personal information
- Name: 김세연 (Kim Se-yeon)
- Born: June 26, 1999 (age 27)
- Nationality: Korean

Career information
- Games: Overwatch
- Playing career: 2016–present
- Role: Tank
- Number: 96

Team history
- 2016: EHOME Spear
- 2017: ROX Orcas
- 2018–2020: Shanghai Dragons

Career highlights and awards
- 3× OWL midseason champion (2019, 2020, 2020); OWL All-Star (2018)

Kim Se-yeon (Korean: 김세연; Hanja: 金世娟, born June 26, 1999), better known as Geguri (게구리), is a South Korean professional Overwatch player who most recently played for the Shanghai Dragons of the Overwatch League.

Kim received international attention for the precision of her computer mouse movements; following an incident in 2016 in which other professional players accused her of using aim assist software, she proved her ability in a monitored studio and was signed to EHOME Spear, a professional team that ultimately disbanded without participation in the first-division APEX tournament. After a short stint with ROX Orcas, she signed with the Dragons in 2018 to become the first female player of the Overwatch League and was later named one of Time's 2019 "Next Generation Leaders."

== Early years ==
Kim first became interested in Overwatch, a first-person shooter video game, after watching cinematic trailers for the game before its release date. She developed a reputation in South Korea as a player in Overwatch based on her plays with the Overwatch character Zarya, specifically due to her aim and win ratio. A staggering ratio of an 80.1 percent win rate in 423 games. A few weeks after she started playing Overwatch, Kim became a member of UW Artisan, an amateur Overwatch team, by invitation. Sometime during this period, Kim was ranked on Overwatch as one of the top Zarya players and developed a reputation for her shooting and win ratio.

In June 2016, Kim became embroiled in a cheating controversy over her performance in an official tournament. Based on a match in the Nexus Cup Korean qualifiers that took place on June 18 Kim was accused by two other professional players, "ELTA" and "Strobe" from team Dizzyness of using an aimbot based on suspicion that her performance was 'too good' and that her mouse precision was not "humanly possible." The controversy began with a post on a forum which suggested that Kim might be cheating based on footage of her play. After the post was made, members who were from the team Kim had defeated during the match accused Kim of using an aimbot. The accusations escalated, and two of her professional opponents said that they would quit Overwatch if Kim were to be exonerated. Kim livestreamed proof of her ability from a Korean eSports website's monitored studio, and both players quit, although one of them returned to the competitive scene under a new username. The Korean branch of Blizzard Entertainment, the game's developer, also confirmed that she had not used aim assist software. The incident brought Kim international fame and anticipation for her professional career.

== Professional career ==
=== EHOME Spear ===
Kim's professional career began in 2016, when she joined EHOME and played with its EHOME Spear team. The team failed to qualify for OGN APEX tournaments and ultimately disbanded in June 2017.

=== ROX Orcas ===
In August 2017, Kim signed with ROX Orcas. Though the team was not a strong performer in prior series, ESPN wrote that its new lineup was an improvement, and Kim's signing was a new height for her career, as she was expected to become Overwatch's first female professional player. Her primary Overwatch character, Zarya, had returned to popular rotation in the professional circuit.

=== Shanghai Dragons ===
In February 2018, Kim became the first female player in the Overwatch League when she joined the Shanghai Dragons. She was chosen among the League's top players to represent the Pacific Division in the League's 2018 All-Star Game. Following the first season, Overwatch League commissioner Nate Nanzer said that Kim "[has] already inspired millions of girls around the world". Kim did not renew her contract with the Dragons following the 2020 season.

== Awards and honors ==
Time named Kim one of its 2019 "Next Generation Leaders" for being one of the first successful female esports players.
