= 2020 Shanghai Dragons season =

- Asia Region champions
- Head coach: Moon Byung-chul
- General manager: Yang Van
- Owner: NetEase
- Conference: Pacific
- Division: West
- Region: Asia

Results
- Record: 19–2 (.905)
- Place: Asia: 1st; League: 1st
- May Melee: Champions
- Summer Showdown: Finals
- Countdown Cup: Champions
- Season Playoffs: GF Lower Finals
- Total Earnings: $595,000

The 2020 Shanghai Dragons season was the third season of the Shanghai Dragons's existence in the Overwatch League and their first under head coach Moon Byung-chul. The Dragons planned to host two homestand weekends in the 2020 season at XinYeFang Studio in Shanghai's Jing'an District. However, due to the COVID-19 pandemic, the all homestand events were cancelled by the league.

== Preceding offseason ==
=== Organizational changes ===
In September 2019, the Dragons parted ways with head coach We "BlueHaS" Seong-hwan and assistant coach Jeong "Levi" Chung-Hyeok. The team promoted Moon Byung-chul, who was the head coach of the Dragons' academy team Team CC, to the head coach of the Dragons. In November, it was announced that the Dragons signed Dong-soo "Dongsu" Shin and former London Spitfire coach former Los Angeles Valiant coach Jeong-min "Jfeel" Kim as assistant coaches.

=== Roster changes ===
The Dragons enter the new season with one free agent, seven players which they have the option to retain for another year, and two players under contract. The OWL's deadline to exercise a team option is November 11, after which any players not retained will become a free agent. Free agency officially began on October 7.

==== Acquisitions ====
The Dragon's first pick up of the offseason was announced on November 12 with the acquisition of DPS Kim "Fleta" Byung-sun from the Seoul Dynasty. The team announced their full roster on November 26, which included the additions of main tank Seo "Stand1" Ji-won from Gladiators Legion, former Los Angeles Gladiators off-tank Kang "Void" Jun-woo, support Lee "LeeJaeGon" Jae-gon from RunAway, and DPS Lee "LIP" Jae-won from Blossom. The team promoted tank player Lee "Fearless" Eui-seok from their academy team Team CC on January 19.

==== Departures ====
The Dragon's first departure was on October 23, when they chose not to exercise their option to retain DPS Jin "YOUNGJIN" Young-jin. Shanghai announced that they would not re-sign their only free agent, Noh "Gamsu" Young-jin, on November 4. Four days later, support Son "CoMa" Kyung-woo was released from the team. The Dragons announced on January 19 that off-tank player Lee "Envy" Kang-jae was released from the team.

== Homestand events ==
In August 2019, the Dragons announced that they would hold two homestand events; both were to be held at XinYeFang Studio in Shanghai's Jing'an District. Due to the COVID-19 pandemic, the Dragons decided to relocate their team to South Korea with no specific return time. Additionally, the league cancelled all February and March matches planned in China, which cancelled the Dragons's first homestand on February 15 to 16. The cancelled matches will be rescheduled for later in the season. The Overwatch League announced that the cancelled homestand events in China would be rescheduled for Weeks 5 through 7 in a studio in Seoul, South Korea; however, due to the COVID-19 pandemic in South Korea, these matches were cancelled as well.

== Roster ==
2020 Shanghai Dragons roster
Players
Coaches

Role	No.	Handle	Name	Nationality
Damage	21	diem (injured)	Bae Min-seong	South Korea
Damage	31	DDing	Yang Jin-hyeok	South Korea
Damage	1	Fleta	Kim Byung-sun	South Korea
Damage	87	Diya (2W)	Lu Weida	China
Damage	70	LIP	Lee Jae-won	South Korea
Tank	17	Stand1	Seo Ji-won	South Korea
Tank	8	Fearless	Lee Eui-seok	South Korea
Tank	57	Void	Kang Jun-woo	South Korea
Tank	96	Geguri	Kim Se-yeon	South Korea
Support	2	LeeJaeGon	Lee Jae-gon	South Korea
Support	66	Luffy	Yang Sung-hyeon	South Korea
Support	22	Izayaki	Kim Min-chul	South Korea

Head coach

- Moon Byung-chul

Legend:
- (I) Inactive
- (S) Suspended
- (2W) Two-way player
- Substitute
- (injured) Injury / Illness

Latest roster transaction: January 19, 2020.

== Standings ==
Pos	Con	Team	Pld	W	BW	L	PCT	MW	ML	MT	MD	Qualification
1	PAC	Shanghai Dragons	21	19	8	2	0.905	59	15	1	+44	Advance to playoffs
2	PAC	Guangzhou Charge	21	14	4	7	0.667	44	39	1	+5	Advance to playoffs
3	ATL	New York Excelsior	21	13	3	8	0.619	50	30	2	+20	Advance to play-ins
4	PAC	Hangzhou Spark	21	10	2	11	0.476	36	40	2	−4	Advance to play-ins
5	PAC	Seoul Dynasty	21	9	3	12	0.429	33	40	2	−7	Advance to play-ins
6	PAC	Chengdu Hunters	21	7	1	14	0.333	33	47	1	−14	Advance to play-ins
7	ATL	London Spitfire	21	6	0	15	0.286	27	51	0	−24	Advance to play-ins

Source: The Overwatch League
Rules for classification: 1) Wins plus bonus wins 2) winning percentage (excluding bonus wins); 3) map differential; 4) head-to-head record; 5) head-to-head map differential

== Game log ==
=== Regular season ===
2020 game log (Regular season record: 19–2)
February–April: 8–1

1	March 28	Shanghai Dragons	3	–	0	Guangzhou Charge	Online
	8:00 am UTC						

2	March 29	Shanghai Dragons	0	–	3	Chengdu Hunters	Online
	8:00 am UTC						

3	April 05	Shanghai Dragons	3	–	0	Hangzhou Spark	Online
	8:00 am UTC						

4	April 06	Shanghai Dragons	3	–	1	Chengdu Hunters	Online
	8:00 am UTC						

5	April 12	Shanghai Dragons	3	–	0	Guangzhou Charge	Online
	10:00 am UTC						

6	April 18	Shanghai Dragons	3	–	0	Hangzhou Spark	Online
	10:00 am UTC						

7	April 19	Shanghai Dragons	3	–	0	Chengdu Hunters	Online
	10:00 am UTC						

8	April 25	Shanghai Dragons	3	–	0	Guangzhou Charge	Online
	9:00 am UTC						

9	April 26	Shanghai Dragons	3	–	0	Seoul Dynasty	Online
	9:30 am UTC						

May Melee qualifiers: 3–1

10	May 02	Shanghai Dragons	3	–	2	New York Excelsior	Online
	9:15 am UTC						

11	May 09	Shanghai Dragons	2	–	3	Seoul Dynasty	Online
	8:00 am UTC						

12	May 10	Shanghai Dragons	3	–	0	Hangzhou Spark	Online
	8:00 am UTC						

13	May 16	Shanghai Dragons	3	–	0	London Spitfire	Online
	10:00 am UTC						

Summer Showdown qualifiers: 4–0

14	June 13	Shanghai Dragons	3	–	0	London Spitfire	Online
	8:00 am UTC						

15	June 21	Shanghai Dragons	3	–	2	Chengdu Hunters	Online
	10:00 am UTC						

16	June 27	Shanghai Dragons	3	–	1	Seoul Dynasty	Online
	10:00 am UTC						

17	June 28	Shanghai Dragons	3	–	0	Hangzhou Spark	Online
	8:00 am UTC						

Countdown Cup qualifiers: 3–0

18	July 25	Shanghai Dragons	3	–	2	London Spitfire	Online
	10:00 am UTC						

19	July 26	Shanghai Dragons	3	–	0	Seoul Dynasty	Online
	10:00 am UTC						

20	August 01	Shanghai Dragons	3	–	1	New York Excelsior	Online
	12:00 noon UTC						

August: 1–0

21	August 15	Shanghai Dragons	3	–	0	London Spitfire	Online
	10:00 am UTC						

=== Midseason tournaments ===
2020 midseason tournaments game log
May Melee: 3–0

Quarterfinals	May 23	Shanghai Dragons	3	–	2	London Spitfire	Online
	11:30 am UTC						

Semifinals	May 24	Shanghai Dragons	3	–	0	New York Excelsior	Online
	10:00 am UTC						

Finals	May 24	Shanghai Dragons	4	–	3	Seoul Dynasty	Online
	11:30 am UTC						

Summer Showdown: 1–1

Quarterfinals	First-round bye

Semifinals	July 05	Shanghai Dragons	3	–	0	Seoul Dynasty	Online
	8:00 am UTC						

Finals	July 05	Shanghai Dragons	2	–	4	Guangzhou Charge	Online
	12:00 noon UTC						

Countdown Cup: 2–0

Quarterfinals	First-round bye

Semifinals	August 09	Shanghai Dragons	3	–	0	New York Excelsior	Online
	8:00 am UTC						

Finals	August 09	Shanghai Dragons	4	–	0	Hangzhou Spark	Online
	12:00 noon UTC						

Bonus wins awarded: 8

=== Postseason ===
2020 playoff game log
Asia Bracket: 2–0

Upper Round 1	September 06	Shanghai Dragons	3	–	1	New York Excelsior	Online
	9:00 am UTC						

Upper Finals	September 12	Shanghai Dragons	3	–	2	Seoul Dynasty	Online
	11:00 am UTC						

Grand Finals Bracket: 1–2

Upper Round 1	October 8	Shanghai Dragons	3	–	0	Philadelphia Fusion	Online
	1:00 pm UTC						

Upper Finals	October 09	Shanghai Dragons	2	–	3	San Francisco Shock	Online
	9:00 am UTC						

Lower Finals	October 09	Shanghai Dragons	2	–	3	Seoul Dynasty	Online
	1:00 pm UTC						
