= 2020 Seoul Dynasty season =

- Head coach: Park Chang-geun
- General manager: Lee Ho-cheol
- Owner: Kevin Chou
- Conference: Pacific
- Division: East
- Region: Asia

Results
- Record: 9–12 (.429)
- Place: Asia: 5th; League: 11th
- May Melee: Finals
- Summer Showdown: Semifinals
- Countdown Cup: Quarterfinals
- Season Playoffs: Grand Finals
- Total Earnings: $795,000

The 2020 Seoul Dynasty season was the third season of the Seoul Dynasty's existence in the Overwatch League. The Dynasty planned to hold two homestand weekends in the 2020 season at the Dongdaemun Design Plaza in Seoul; however, due to the COVID-19 pandemic, all homestand events were cancelled.

== Preceding offseason ==
=== Organizational changes ===
In October 2019, head coach Kim "KDG" Dong-gun's contract expired, and he did not re-sign with the team. Later that month, Seoul promoted assistant coach Park "changoon" Chang-geun to head coach and brought up Mun "MMA" Seong-won from Gen.G Esports as an assistant coach. The team released assistant coach Lee "WhyNot" Ju-hyeop in early November. On November 8, Seoul signed former Washington Justice head coach Kim "WizardHyeong" Hyeong-seok as a strategic coach.

=== Roster changes ===
Free agents
Role	Player		Contract status	Date signed	2020 team
Role	Handle	Name	Contract status	Date signed	2020 team
Support	Ryujehong	Je-Hong Ryu	Free agent	November 27	Vancouver Titans
Support	Tobi	Jin-Mo Yang	Free agent	October 29	Seoul Dynasty
Tank	Zunba	Joon-Hyeok Kim	Free agent	–	–
Legend Re-signed/Retained by the Dynasty. Departed from the Dynasty.

The Dynasty enter the new season with three free agents, one player which they have the option to retain for another year, and six players under contract. The OWL's deadline to exercise a team option is November 11, after which any players not retained will become a free agent. Free agency officially began on October 7.

==== Acquisitions ====
The Dynasty's first acquisition of the offseason was on October 22, when they agreed to acquire tank Hong "Gesture" Jae-hee and DPS Park "Profit" Joon-yeong from the London Spitfire. A week later, support Kim "Creative" Young-wan was promoted from Seoul's academy team Gen.G Esports. On January 12, the Dynasty announced the signing of former London Spitfire support player Choi "Bdosin" Seung-tae.

==== Departures ====
The first player to depart from the Dynasty was main support Lee "Jecse" Seung-soo, as he was released from the team on November 1. Two weeks later, it was announced that Seoul transferred DPS Kim "Fleta" Byung-sun to the Shanghai Dragons. On November 23, it was announced that support Lee "Highly" Sung-hyeok had been signed to the London Spitfire. On November 27, veteran support player Ryu "ryujehong" Je-hong was signed to the Vancouver Titans, and three weeks later, Seoul parted ways with off-tank Kim "zunba" Joon-hyeok.

== Homestand events ==
In December 2019, the Dynasty announced that they would hold two homestand events; both were to be held the Dongdaemun Design Plaza in Seoul. Due to the COVID-19 pandemic in South Korea, the league cancelled the Dynasty's March homestand event that was initially set to be held from March 7 to 8. The game will be made up, with exact dates and times to be announced later.

== Roster ==
2020 Seoul Dynasty roster
Players
Coaches

Role	No.	Handle	Name	Nationality
Damage	1	FITS	Kim Dong-eun	South Korea
Damage	21	ILLICIT	Park Jae-min	South Korea
Damage	13	Profit	Park Joon-yeong	South Korea
Tank	7	Gesture	Hong Jae-hee	South Korea
Tank	11	Marve1	Hwang Min-seo	South Korea
Tank	99	Michelle	Choi Min-hyuk	South Korea
Tank	6	Toyou (2W)	Lim Hyun-woo	South Korea
Support	10	Bdosin	Choi Seung-tae	South Korea
Support	20	Creative	Kim Young-wan	South Korea
Support	4	tobi	Yang Jin-mo	South Korea
Support	28	SLIME	Kim Sung-jun	South Korea

Head coach

- Park "changoon" Chang-geun

Legend:
- (I) Inactive
- (S) Suspended
- (2W) Two-way player
- Substitute
- (injured) Injury / Illness

Latest roster transaction: August 6, 2020.

== Standings ==
Pos	Con	Team	Pld	W	BW	L	PCT	MW	ML	MT	MD	Qualification
1	PAC	Shanghai Dragons	21	19	8	2	0.905	59	15	1	+44	Advance to playoffs
2	PAC	Guangzhou Charge	21	14	4	7	0.667	44	39	1	+5	Advance to playoffs
3	ATL	New York Excelsior	21	13	3	8	0.619	50	30	2	+20	Advance to play-ins
4	PAC	Hangzhou Spark	21	10	2	11	0.476	36	40	2	−4	Advance to play-ins
5	PAC	Seoul Dynasty	21	9	3	12	0.429	33	40	2	−7	Advance to play-ins
6	PAC	Chengdu Hunters	21	7	1	14	0.333	33	47	1	−14	Advance to play-ins
7	ATL	London Spitfire	21	6	0	15	0.286	27	51	0	−24	Advance to play-ins

Source: The Overwatch League
Rules for classification: 1) Wins plus bonus wins 2) winning percentage (excluding bonus wins); 3) map differential; 4) head-to-head record; 5) head-to-head map differential

== Game log ==
=== Regular season ===
2020 game log (Regular season record: 9–12)
February–April: 3–1

1	March 28	Seoul Dynasty	3	–	0	Los Angeles Valiant	Online
	10:00 pm UTC						

2	March 29	Seoul Dynasty	3	–	0	Los Angeles Gladiators	Online
	10:00 pm UTC						

3	April 25	Seoul Dynasty	3	–	0	Hangzhou Spark	Online
	8:00 am UTC						

4	April 26	Seoul Dynasty	0	–	3	Shanghai Dragons	Online
	9:30 am UTC						

May Melee qualifiers: 1–3

5	May 02	Seoul Dynasty	0	–	3	Guangzhou Charge	Online
	8:00 am UTC						

6	May 03	Seoul Dynasty	0	–	3	Hangzhou Spark	Online
	8:00 am UTC						

7	May 09	Seoul Dynasty	3	–	2	Shanghai Dragons	Online
	8:00 am UTC						

8	May 16	Seoul Dynasty	0	–	3	Chengdu Hunters	Online
	8:00 am UTC						

Summer Showdown qualifiers: 1–3

9	June 13	Seoul Dynasty	0	–	3	New York Excelsior	Online
	9:30 am UTC						

10	June 20	Seoul Dynasty	2	–	3	Guangzhou Charge	Online
	8:00 am UTC						

11	June 27	Seoul Dynasty	1	–	3	Shanghai Dragons	Online
	10:00 am UTC						

12	June 28	Seoul Dynasty	3	–	0	Chengdu Hunters	Online
	10:00 am UTC						

Countdown Cup qualifiers: 0–4

13	July 18	Seoul Dynasty	0	–	3	Hangzhou Spark	Online
	8:00 am UTC						

14	July 25	Seoul Dynasty	2	–	3	Chengdu Hunters	Online
	8:00 am UTC						

15	July 26	Seoul Dynasty	0	–	3	Shanghai Dragons	Online
	10:00 am UTC						

16	August 01	Seoul Dynasty	1	–	3	Guangzhou Charge	Online
	8:00 am UTC						

August: 4–1

17	August 14	Seoul Dynasty	3	–	0	London Spitfire	Online
	8:00 am UTC						

18	August 15	Seoul Dynasty	3	–	0	New York Excelsior	Online
	8:00 am UTC						

19	August 16	Seoul Dynasty	3	–	0	London Spitfire	Online
	8:00 am UTC						

20	August 22	Seoul Dynasty	0	–	3	Hangzhou Spark	Online
	8:00 am UTC						

21	August 23	Seoul Dynasty	3	–	2	London Spitfire	Online
	8:00 am UTC						

=== Midseason tournaments ===
2020 midseason tournaments game log
May Melee: 2–1

Quarterfinals	May 23	Seoul Dynasty	3	–	0	Hangzhou Spark	Online
	8:00 am UTC						

Semifinals	May 24	Seoul Dynasty	3	–	2	Guangzhou Charge	Online
	8:00 am UTC						

Finals	May 24	Seoul Dynasty	3	–	4	Shanghai Dragons	Online
	11:30 am UTC						

Summer Showdown: 1–1

Quarterfinals	July 04	Seoul Dynasty	3	–	1	London Spitfire	Online
	10:00 am UTC						

Semifinals	July 05	Seoul Dynasty	0	–	3	Shanghai Dragons	Online
	8:00 am UTC						

Countdown Cup: 0–1

Quarterfinals	August 08	Seoul Dynasty	2	–	3	Hangzhou Spark	Online
	10:00 am UTC						

Bonus wins awarded: 3

=== Postseason ===
2020 playoff game log
Asia Play-ins: 1–0

Round 1	First-round bye

Round 2	September 05	Seoul Dynasty	3	–	0	Hangzhou Spark	Online
	11:00 am UTC						

Asia Bracket: 2–1

Upper Round 1	September 06	Seoul Dynasty	3	–	0	Guangzhou Charge	Online
	11:00 am UTC						

Upper Finals	September 12	Seoul Dynasty	2	–	3	Shanghai Dragons	Online
	11:00 am UTC						

Lower Finals	September 13	Seoul Dynasty	3	–	0	New York Excelsior	Online
	9:00 am UTC						

Grand Finals Bracket: 2–2

Upper Round 1	October 08	Seoul Dynasty	2	–	3	San Francisco Shock	Online
	11:00 am UTC						

Lower Round 1	October 09	Seoul Dynasty	3	–	0	Philadelphia Fusion	Online
	11:00 am UTC						

Lower Finals	October 09	Seoul Dynasty	3	–	2	Shanghai Dragons	Online
	1:00 pm UTC						

Grand Finals	October 10	Seoul Dynasty	2	–	4	San Francisco Shock	Online
	1:00 pm UTC						
