= 2020 London Spitfire season =

- Head coach: Hong "Agape" Cheol-yong
- General manager: Lee Seung-hwan
- Owner: Jack Etienne
- Conference: Atlantic
- Division: North
- Region: Asia

Results
- Record: 6–15 (.286)
- Place: Asia: 7th; League: 17th
- May Melee: Quarterfinals
- Summer Showdown: Quarterfinals
- Countdown Cup: Quarterfinals
- Season Playoffs: Did not qualify
- Total Earnings: $0

The 2020 London Spitfire season was the third season of the London Spitfire's existence in the Overwatch League. The Spitfire planned to host two homestand events in the 2020 season; the first was to be held at The SSE Arena Wembley, while the second was to be at the National Exhibition Centre in Birmingham. However, all homestand events were canceled due to the COVID-19 pandemic.

== Preceding offseason ==
=== Organizational changes ===
In early October 2019, the Spitfire parted ways with coach Kim "Jfeel" Jeong-min, who had been with the team since London's inception.

London found their new head coach within the organization, promoting assistant coach Hong "Agape" Cheol-yong to the position. Additionally, the team signed former New York Excelsior head coach Ty "Pavane" Hyun-sang, former Florida Mayhem assistant coach Kim "SNT" Sung-hoon, and former O2 Blast assistant coach Lim "Twinkl" Young-bin all as assistant coaches. The changes reunited Agape, Pavane, and SNT, as Apage and Pavane previously coached LuxuryWatch Blue and LuxuryWatch Red together, while SNT played with LuxuryWatch Red at the same time.

=== Roster changes ===
Free agents
| Role | Player | | Contract status | Date signed | 2020 team |
| Role | Handle | Name | Contract status | Date signed | 2020 team |
|---|---|---|---|---|---|
| Damage | Birdring | Ji-Hyeok Kim | Free agent | 6 November | Los Angeles Gladiators |
| Damage | Guard | Hee-Dong Lee | Free agent | – | – |
| Support | Nus | Jong-Seok Kim | Free agent | – | – |
Legend Re-signed/Retained by the Spitfire. Departed from the Spitfire.

The Spitfire enter the new season with three free agents, one players which they have the option to retain for another year, and five players under contract. The OWL's deadline to exercise a team option is 11 November, after which any players not retained will become a free agent. Free agency officially began on 7 October.

==== Acquisitions ====
The Spitfire's first acquisitions of the offseason were announced on 30 October, when the team traded tank Kim "Fury" Jun-ho to the Philadelphia Fusion in exchange for Fusion University players tank Shin "BERNAR" Se-won and support Kim "Fuze" Tae-hoon.

London announced eight players on their roster on 23 November. The five new players announced were support players Lee "Highly" Sung-hyeok and Lim "SanGuiNar" Kyu-min, DPS players Lee "Schwi" Dong-Jae and Lim "Glister" Gil-seong, as well as tank player Choi "JMAC" Dae Han. Of the players, only Highly has ever previously played for an OWL team, while the remaining had only experience in Overwatch Contenders. The following month, on 27 December, London announced four more players to round out their 12-man roster in damage players Jung "Although" Hyun-wook and Park "Babel" Sang-jun and support players Kim "Jihun" Ji-hun and Cho "Clestyn" Gun-hee.

==== Departures ====
The Spitfire elected not to re-sign all three of their free agents, DPS Kim "Birdring" Ji-hyeok, support Kim "NUS" Jong-seok, and alternate DPS Lee "Guard" Hee-dong, heading into the 2020 season.

On 22 October, the Spitfire agreed to transfer tank Hong "Gesture" Jae-hee and DPS Park "Profit" Joon-yeong to the Seoul Dynasty. The team released Choi "Bdosin" Seung-tae and Song "Quatermain" Ji-hoon in mid-November. With the release of Bdosin, no players from the Spitfire's 2018 Grand Finals roster remained with the team.

== Roster ==
2020 London Spitfire roster
Players
Coaches

| Role | No. | Handle | Name | Nationality |
|---|---|---|---|---|
| Damage | 1 | Schwi | Lee Dong-jae | South Korea |
| Damage | 26 | Glister | Lim Gil-seong | South Korea |
| Damage | 23 | ALTHOUGH | Jung Hyeon-wook | South Korea |
| Damage | 16 | Babel | Park Sang-jun | South Korea |
| Tank | 97 | JMAC | Choi Dae-han | South Korea |
| Tank | 18 | BERNAR | Shin Se-won | South Korea |
| Tank | 30 | Clestyn | Cho Gun-hee | South Korea |
| Tank | 5 | Jihun | Kim Ji-hun | South Korea |
| Support | 11 | Krillin | Jeong Yung-hoon | South Korea |
| Support | 10 | Highly | Lee Sung-hyeok | South Korea |
| Support | 14 | SanGuiNar | Lim Kyu-min | South Korea |
| Support | 99 | Fuze | Kim Tae-hoon | South Korea |

Head coach

- Hong "Agape" Cheol-yong

Legend:
- (I) Inactive
- (S) Suspended
- (2W) Two-way player
- Substitute
- (injured) Injury / Illness

Latest roster transaction: 27 December 2019.

== Standings ==
| Pos | Con | Team | Pld | W | BW | L | PCT | MW | ML | MT | MD | Qualification |
|---|---|---|---|---|---|---|---|---|---|---|---|---|
| 1 | PAC | Shanghai Dragons | 21 | 19 | 8 | 2 | 0.905 | 59 | 15 | 1 | +44 | Advance to playoffs |
| 2 | PAC | Guangzhou Charge | 21 | 14 | 4 | 7 | 0.667 | 44 | 39 | 1 | +5 | Advance to playoffs |
| 3 | ATL | New York Excelsior | 21 | 13 | 3 | 8 | 0.619 | 50 | 30 | 2 | +20 | Advance to play-ins |
| 4 | PAC | Hangzhou Spark | 21 | 10 | 2 | 11 | 0.476 | 36 | 40 | 2 | −4 | Advance to play-ins |
| 5 | PAC | Seoul Dynasty | 21 | 9 | 3 | 12 | 0.429 | 33 | 40 | 2 | −7 | Advance to play-ins |
| 6 | PAC | Chengdu Hunters | 21 | 7 | 1 | 14 | 0.333 | 33 | 47 | 1 | −14 | Advance to play-ins |
| 7 | ATL | London Spitfire | 21 | 6 | 0 | 15 | 0.286 | 27 | 51 | 0 | −24 | Advance to play-ins |

Source: The Overwatch League
Rules for classification: 1) Wins plus bonus wins 2) winning percentage (excluding bonus wins); 3) map differential; 4) head-to-head record; 5) head-to-head map differential

== Game log ==
=== Regular season ===
2020 game log (Regular season record: 6–15)
February–April: 3–2

| 1 | 8 February | London Spitfire | 1 | – | 3 | New York Excelsior | New York City, NY |
| | 8:00 pm GMT | | | | | | Hammerstein Ballroom |
| | | 2 | Lijiang Tower | | | 0 | |
| | | 2 | King's Row | | | 3 | |
| | | 1 | Horizon Lunar Colony | | | 2 | |
| | | 0 | Junkertown | | | 3 | |

| 2 | 9 February | London Spitfire | 0 | – | 3 | Paris Eternal | New York City, NY |
| | 6:00 pm GMT | | | | | | Hammerstein Ballroom |
| | | 0 | Nepal | | | 2 | |
| | | 3 | King's Row | | | 4 | |
| | | 1 | Hanamura | | | 2 | |

| 3 | 23 February | London Spitfire | 3 | – | 2 | Washington Justice | Washington, DC |
| | 12:00 midnight GMT | | | | | | The Anthem |
| | | 0 | Oasis | | | 2 | |
| | | 1 | Hanamura | | | 2 | |
| | | 1 | Dorado | | | 0 | |
| | | 3 | Blizzard World | | | 0 | |
| | | 2 | Nepal | | | 1 | |

| 4 | 29 February | London Spitfire | 3 | – | 2 | Houston Outlaws | Houston, TX |
| | 12:00 midnight GMT | | | | | | Revention Music Center |
| | | 2 | Busan | | | 0 | |
| | | 2 | Blizzard World | | | 1 | |
| | | 1 | Temple of Anubis | | | 2 | |
| | | 2 | Junkertown | | | 3 | |
| | | 2 | Ilios | | | 1 | |

| 5 | 1 March | London Spitfire | 3 | – | 2 | Florida Mayhem | Houston, TX |
| | 10:00 pm GMT | | | | | | Revention Music Center |
| | | 1 | Ilios | | | 2 | |
| | | 2 | Eichenwalde | | | 1 | |
| | | 3 | Horizon Lunar Colony | | | 4 | |
| | | 3 | Havana | | | 2 | |
| | | 2 | Oasis | | | 0 | |

May Melee qualifiers: 1–3

| 6 | 9 May | London Spitfire | 3 | – | 0 | Chengdu Hunters | Online |
| | 10:00 am UTC | | | | | | |

| 7 | 10 May | London Spitfire | 1 | – | 3 | Guangzhou Charge | Online |
| | 10:00 am UTC | | | | | | |

| 8 | 16 May | London Spitfire | 0 | – | 3 | Shanghai Dragons | Online |
| | 10:00 am UTC | | | | | | |

| 9 | 17 May | London Spitfire | 0 | – | 3 | Hangzhou Spark | Online |
| | 10:00 am UTC | | | | | | |

Summer Showdown qualifiers: 2–2

| 10 | 13 June | London Spitfire | 0 | – | 3 | Shanghai Dragons | Online |
| | 8:00 am UTC | | | | | | |

| 11 | 20 June | London Spitfire | 3 | – | 0 | Chengdu Hunters | Online |
| | 10:00 am UTC | | | | | | |

| 12 | 21 June | London Spitfire | 1 | – | 3 | New York Excelsior | Online |
| | 12:30 pm UTC | | | | | | |

| 13 | 27 June | London Spitfire | 3 | – | 0 | Hangzhou Spark | Online |
| | 12:00 noon UTC | | | | | | |

Countdown Cup qualifiers: 0–3

| 14 | 18 July | London Spitfire | 1 | – | 3 | Guangzhou Charge | Online |
| | 10:00 am UTC | | | | | | |

| 15 | 25 July | London Spitfire | 2 | – | 3 | Shanghai Dragons | Online |
| | 10:00 am UTC | | | | | | |

| 16 | 1 August | London Spitfire | 0 | – | 3 | Hangzhou Spark | Online |
| | 10:00 am UTC | | | | | | |

August: 0–5

| 17 | 14 August | London Spitfire | 0 | – | 3 | Seoul Dynasty | Online |
| | 8:00 am UTC | | | | | | |

| 18 | 15 August | London Spitfire | 0 | – | 3 | Shanghai Dragons | Online |
| | 10:00 am UTC | | | | | | |

| 19 | 16 August | London Spitfire | 0 | – | 3 | Seoul Dynasty | Online |
| | 8:00 am UTC | | | | | | |

| 20 | 22 August | London Spitfire | 1 | – | 3 | New York Excelsior | Online |
| | 10:00 am UTC | | | | | | |

| 21 | 23 August | London Spitfire | 2 | – | 3 | Seoul Dynasty | Online |
| | 8:00 am UTC | | | | | | |

=== Midseason tournaments ===
2020 midseason tournaments game log
May Melee: 0–1

| Quarterfinals | 23 May | London Spitfire | 2 | – | 3 | Shanghai Dragons | Online |
| | 11:30 am UTC | | | | | | |

Summer Showdown: 0–1

| Quarterfinals | 4 July | London Spitfire | 1 | – | 3 | Seoul Dynasty | Online |
| | 10:00 am UTC | | | | | | |

Countdown Cup: 0–1

| Quarterfinals | 8 August | London Spitfire | 0 | – | 3 | Chengdu Hunters | Online |
| | 8:00 am UTC | | | | | | |

Bonus wins awarded: 0

=== Postseason ===
2020 playoff game log
Asia Play-ins: 0–1

| Round 1 | 4 September | London Spitfire | 1 | – | 3 | Chengdu Hunters | Online |
| | 9:00 am UTC | | | | | | |
