= 2020 New York Excelsior season =

- Head coach: Jeong "imt" Yong-cheol
- General manager: Kim Yo-han
- Owner: Jeff Wilpon
- Arena(s): Hammerstein Ballroom
- Conference: Atlantic
- Division: North
- Region: Asia

Results
- Record: 13–8 (.619)
- Place: Asia: 3rd; League: 7th
- May Melee: Semifinals
- Summer Showdown: Semifinals
- Countdown Cup: Semifinals
- Season Playoffs: Asia Lower Finals
- Total Earnings: $290,000

The 2020 New York Excelsior season was the third season of New York Excelsior's (NYXL) existence in the Overwatch League and their first under head coach Jeong "imt" Yong-cheol. New York planned to host two homestand weekends in the 2020 season at the Hammerstein Ballroom in the Manhattan Center. While the first homestand took place, all other homestand events were canceled due to the COVID-19 pandemic.

== Preceding offseason ==
=== Organizational changes ===
On October 21, 2019, New York parted ways with head coach Ty "Pavane" Hyun-sang, as he joined the London Spitfire as an assistant coach. Pavane had been with the team since its inception and led them to a 56–12 regular season record over his career with the team. In his replacement, New York promoted assistant coach Jeong "imt" Yong-cheol as their new head coach on November 19. On December 1, NYXL signed former Seoul Dynasty assistant coach Lee "WhyNot" Ju-hyub as an assistant coach.

=== Roster changes ===
The Excelsior enter the new season with one free agents, one players which they have the option to retain for another year, and seven players under contract. The OWL's deadline to exercise a team option is November 11, after which any players not retained will become a free agent. Free agency officially began on October 7.

==== Acquisitions ====
NYXL's first offseason acquisition was on February 15, when the team announced the signing of former Guangzhou Charge off-tank Choi "HOTBA" Hong-jun. The following week, the team promoted off-tank Kim "BiaNcA" Dong-wook from their academy team, XL2 Academy. On November 26, New York signed support player Kim "Mandu" Chan-hee from Korean Contenders team O2 Blast. The following week, on December 4, the team signed DPS player Lee "WhoRU" Seung-joon from Fusion University.

==== Departures ====
On October 8, the Excelsior announced that they would not pick up their option to keep DPS Yeon-Oh "Fl0w3r" Hwang on the roster another year. A week later, the team announced that they would not re-sign off-tank Kim "MekO" Tae Hong, who had been with the team since their inception in 2017. On December 6, the team announced that DPS player Kim "Pine" Do-hyeon had retired from professional Overwatch and would become a streamer for NYXL.

== Roster ==
2020 New York Excelsior roster
Players
Coaches

Role	No.	Handle	Name	Nationality
Damage	9	Saebyeolbe (C)	Park Jong-ryeol	South Korea
Damage	10	Libero	Kim Hae-seong	South Korea
Damage	23	WhoRU	Lee Seung-jun	South Korea
Damage	31	Nenne	Jeong Yeon-kwan	South Korea
Damage	1	Haksal	Kim Hyo-jong	South Korea
Tank	7	Mano	Kim Dong-gyu	South Korea
Tank	17	HOTBA	Choi Hong-joon	South Korea
Tank	13	BiaNcA	Kim Dong-wook	South Korea
Support	44	JJoNak	Bang Seong-hyun	South Korea
Support	97	Anamo	Jung Tae-sung	South Korea
Support	2	Mandu (I)	Kim Chan-hee	South Korea

Head coach

- Jeong "imt" Yong-cheol

Legend:
- (I) Inactive
- (S) Suspended
- (2W) Two-way player
- Substitute
- (injured) Injury / Illness

Latest roster transaction: June 5, 2020.

== Standings ==
Pos	Con	Team	Pld	W	BW	L	PCT	MW	ML	MT	MD	Qualification
1	PAC	Shanghai Dragons	21	19	8	2	0.905	59	15	1	+44	Advance to playoffs
2	PAC	Guangzhou Charge	21	14	4	7	0.667	44	39	1	+5	Advance to playoffs
3	ATL	New York Excelsior	21	13	3	8	0.619	50	30	2	+20	Advance to play-ins
4	PAC	Hangzhou Spark	21	10	2	11	0.476	36	40	2	−4	Advance to play-ins
5	PAC	Seoul Dynasty	21	9	3	12	0.429	33	40	2	−7	Advance to play-ins
6	PAC	Chengdu Hunters	21	7	1	14	0.333	33	47	1	−14	Advance to play-ins
7	ATL	London Spitfire	21	6	0	15	0.286	27	51	0	−24	Advance to play-ins

Source: The Overwatch League
Rules for classification: 1) Wins plus bonus wins 2) winning percentage (excluding bonus wins); 3) map differential; 4) head-to-head record; 5) head-to-head map differential

== Game log ==
=== Regular season ===
2020 game log (Regular season record: 13–8)
February–April: 7–1

1	February 08	London Spitfire	1	–	3	New York Excelsior	New York City, NY
	3:00 pm EST						Hammerstein Ballroom
Hosted by New York Excelsior
		2	Lijiang Tower			0	
		2	King's Row			3	
		1	Horizon Lunar Colony			2	
		0	Junkertown			3	

2	February 09	Boston Uprising	0	–	3	New York Excelsior	New York City, NY
	3:00 pm EST						Hammerstein Ballroom
Hosted by New York Excelsior
		0	Oasis			2	
		1	Blizzard World			2	
		2	Temple of Anubis			3	

3	February 22	New York Excelsior	1	–	3	Philadelphia Fusion	Washington, DC
	3:00 pm EST						The Anthem
Hosted by Washington Justice
		1	Busan			2	
		0	Horizon Lunar Colony			2	
		3	Havana			2	
		3	Eichenwalde			4	

4	February 23	New York Excelsior	3	–	0	Houston Outlaws	Washington, DC
	3:00 pm EST						The Anthem
Hosted by Washington Justice
		2	Ilios			0	
		2	Hanamura			1	
		3	Havana			0	

5	February 29	New York Excelsior	3	–	0	Florida Mayhem	Houston, TX
	3:00 pm EST						Revention Music Center
Hosted by Houston Outlaws
		2	Ilios			0	
		4	King's Row			3	
		2	Temple of Anubis			1	

6	March 08	New York Excelsior	3	–	1	Washington Justice	Washington, DC
	5:00 pm EDT						The Anthem
Hosted by Washington Justice
		0	Nepal			2	
		3	Dorado			2	
		3	King's Row			1	
		1	Horizon Lunar Colony			0	

7	April 25	New York Excelsior	3	–	0	Chengdu Hunters	Online
	10:00 am UTC						

8	April 26	New York Excelsior	3	–	0	Guangzhou Charge	Online
	10:30 am UTC						

May Melee qualifiers: 2–2

9	May 02	New York Excelsior	2	–	3	Shanghai Dragons	Online
	9:15 am UTC						

10	May 03	New York Excelsior	3	–	1	Chengdu Hunters	Online
	10:00 am UTC						

11	May 09	New York Excelsior	1	–	3	Guangzhou Charge	Online
	12:00 noon UTC						

12	May 16	New York Excelsior	3	–	1	Hangzhou Spark	Online
	12:00 noon UTC						

Summer Showdown qualifiers: 2–2

13	June 13	New York Excelsior	3	–	0	Seoul Dynasty	Online
	9:30 am UTC						

14	June 20	New York Excelsior	2	–	3	Hangzhou Spark	Online
	12:00 noon UTC						

15	June 21	New York Excelsior	3	–	1	London Spitfire	Online
	12:30 pm UTC						

16	June 28	New York Excelsior	2	–	3	Guangzhou Charge	Online
	12:00 noon UTC						

Countdown Cup qualifiers: 1–2

17	July 18	New York Excelsior	2	–	3	Chengdu Hunters	Online
	12:00 noon UTC						

18	July 25	New York Excelsior	3	–	0	Guangzhou Charge	Online
	12:00 noon UTC						

19	August 01	New York Excelsior	1	–	3	Shanghai Dragons	Online
	12:00 noon UTC						

August: 1–1

20	August 15	New York Excelsior	0	–	3	Seoul Dynasty	Online
	8:00 am UTC						

21	August 22	New York Excelsior	3	–	1	London Spitfire	Online
	10:00 am UTC						

=== Midseason tournaments ===
2020 midseason tournaments game log
May Melee: 1–1

Quarterfinals	May 23	New York Excelsior	3	–	2	Chengdu Hunters	Online
	9:15 am UTC						

Semifinals	May 24	New York Excelsior	0	–	3	Shanghai Dragons	Online
	10:00 am UTC						

Summer Showdown: 1–1

Quarterfinals	July 04	New York Excelsior	3	–	0	Hangzhou Spark	Online
	12:00 noon UTC						

Semifinals	July 05	New York Excelsior	0	–	3	Guangzhou Charge	Online
	10:00 am UTC						

Countdown Cup: 1–1

Quarterfinals	August 08	New York Excelsior	3	–	2	Guangzhou Charge	Online
	12:00 noon UTC						

Semifinals	August 09	New York Excelsior	0	–	3	Shanghai Dragons	Online
	8:00 am UTC						

Bonus wins awarded: 3

=== Postseason ===
2020 playoff game log
Asia Play-ins: 1–0

Round 1	First-round bye

Round 2	September 05	New York Excelsior	3	–	2	Chengdu Hunters	Online
	9:00 am UTC						

Asia Bracket: 1–2

Upper Round 1	September 06	New York Excelsior	1	–	3	Shanghai Dragons	Online
	9:00 am UTC						

Lower Round 1	September 12	New York Excelsior	3	–	0	Guangzhou Charge	Online
	9:00 am UTC						

Lower Finals	September 13	New York Excelsior	0	–	3	Seoul Dynasty	Online
	9:00 am UTC						
