= 2020 Hangzhou Spark season =

Chinese esports team season

- Head coach: Lee "Mask" Mu-ho (Released 31 July); Hwang "paJion" Ji-sub
- General manager: Saisai Huang
- Owner: Rui Chen
- Conference: Pacific
- Division: East
- Region: Asia

Results
- Record: 10–11 (.476)
- Place: Asia: 4th; League: 10th
- May Melee: Quarterfinals
- Summer Showdown: Quarterfinals
- Countdown Cup: Finals
- Season Playoffs: Did not qualify
- Total Earnings: $35,000

The 2020 Hangzhou Spark season was the second season of Hangzhou Spark's existence in the Overwatch League and their second season under head coach Lee "Mask" Mu-ho. The Spark planned on hosting two homestand events in the 2020 season, taking place at the Hangzhou Grand Theatre and Wuzhen Grand Theatre; however, due to the COVID-19 pandemic, all homestand events were cancelled by the league.

== Preceding offseason ==
=== Organizational changes ===
In late October, the Spark announced that they had parted ways with assistant coach Han "Sup7eme" Seung-jun. The team signed former Florida Mayhem assistant coach Jung "yeah" Young-su as an assistant coach in mid-November.

=== Roster changes ===
The Spark enter the new season with no free agents, four players which they have the option to retain for another year, and eight players under contract. The OWL's deadline to exercise a team option was November 11, after which any players not retained became a free agent. Free agency officially began on October 7. The Spark's first departure of the offseason was on November 11, when the team released flex support An "Revenge" Hyeong-Geun. On November 23, it was announced that tank player Jeong "NoSmite" Da-Un had signed to the Paris Eternal. The Spark promoted support players Liu "M1ka" Jiming and Tong "Coldest" Xiaodong from their academy team Bilibili Gaming on January 14.

== Homestand events ==
In August 2019, the Spark announced that they would hold two homestand events, with the first at the Hangzhou Theatre from February 29 to March 1, 2020, and the second at the Wuzhen Grand Theatre from June 21 to 22, 2020. However, due to the COVID-19 pandemic, the league cancelled all February and March matches planned in China, which cancelled the Spark's first homestand at the Hangzhou Theatre. The Overwatch League announced that the cancelled homestand events in China would be rescheduled for Weeks 5 through 7 in a studio in Seoul, South Korea; however, due to the COVID-19 pandemic in South Korea, these matches were cancelled as well.

== Roster ==
2020 Hangzhou Spark roster
Players
Coaches

Role	No.	Handle	Name	Nationality
Damage	17	Ado	Chon Gi-hyeon	South Korea
Damage	1	Adora	Kang Jae-hwan	South Korea
Damage	21	Architect	Park Min-ho	South Korea
Damage	10	GodsB	Kim Kyeong-bo	South Korea
Damage	20	SASIN	Song Sang-hyun	South Korea
Tank	8	guxue	Xu Qiulin	China
Tank		QoQ	Yu Sung-jun	South Korea
Tank	11	Ria (I)	Park Seong-wook	South Korea
Support	23	BeBe	Yoon Hui-chang	South Korea
Support	37	iDK	Park Ho-jin	South Korea
Support	14	Coldest	Tong Xiaodong	China
Support	13	M1ka	Liu Jiming	China

Head coach

- Lee "Mask" Mu-ho

Legend:
- (I) Inactive
- (S) Suspended
- (2W) Two-way player
- Substitute
- (injured) Injury / Illness

Latest roster transaction: June 18, 2020.

=== Transactions ===
Transactions of/for players on the roster during the 2020 regular season:

- On February 13, the Spark signed damage player Chon "Ado" Gi-hyeon.

== Standings ==
Pos	Con	Team	Pld	W	BW	L	PCT	MW	ML	MT	MD	Qualification
1	PAC	Shanghai Dragons	21	19	8	2	0.905	59	15	1	+44	Advance to playoffs
2	PAC	Guangzhou Charge	21	14	4	7	0.667	44	39	1	+5	Advance to playoffs
3	ATL	New York Excelsior	21	13	3	8	0.619	50	30	2	+20	Advance to play-ins
4	PAC	Hangzhou Spark	21	10	2	11	0.476	36	40	2	−4	Advance to play-ins
5	PAC	Seoul Dynasty	21	9	3	12	0.429	33	40	2	−7	Advance to play-ins
6	PAC	Chengdu Hunters	21	7	1	14	0.333	33	47	1	−14	Advance to play-ins
7	ATL	London Spitfire	21	6	0	15	0.286	27	51	0	−24	Advance to play-ins

Source: The Overwatch League
Rules for classification: 1) Wins plus bonus wins 2) winning percentage (excluding bonus wins); 3) map differential; 4) head-to-head record; 5) head-to-head map differential

== Game log ==
=== Regular season ===
2020 game log (Regular season record: 10–11)
February–March: 4–5

1	March 28	Hangzhou Spark	3	–	2	Chengdu Hunters	Online
	9:30 am UTC						

2	March 29	Hangzhou Spark	2	–	3	Guangzhou Charge	Online
	10:00 am UTC						

3	April 05	Hangzhou Spark	0	–	3	Shanghai Dragons	Online
	8:00 am UTC						

4	April 06	Hangzhou Spark	3	–	2	Guangzhou Charge	Online
	10:00 am UTC						

5	April 11	Hangzhou Spark	3	–	0	Chengdu Hunters	Online
	8:00 am UTC						

6	April 18	Hangzhou Spark	0	–	3	Shanghai Dragons	Online
	10:00 am UTC						

7	April 19	Hangzhou Spark	1	–	3	Guangzhou Charge	Online
	8:00 am UTC						

8	April 25	Hangzhou Spark	0	–	3	Seoul Dynasty	Online
	8:00 am UTC						

9	April 26	Hangzhou Spark	3	–	1	Chengdu Hunters	Online
	8:00 am UTC						

May Melee qualifiers: 2–2

10	May 03	Hangzhou Spark	3	–	0	Seoul Dynasty	Online
	8:00 am UTC						

11	May 10	Hangzhou Spark	0	–	3	Shanghai Dragons	Online
	8:00 am UTC						

12	May 16	Hangzhou Spark	1	–	3	New York Excelsior	Online
	12:00 noon UTC						

13	May 17	Hangzhou Spark	3	–	0	London Spitfire	Online
	10:00 am UTC						

Summer Showdown qualifiers: 1–3

14	June 20	Hangzhou Spark	3	–	2	New York Excelsior	Online
	12:00 noon UTC						

15	June 21	Hangzhou Spark	2	–	3	Guangzhou Charge	Online
	8:00 am UTC						

16	June 27	Hangzhou Spark	0	–	3	London Spitfire	Online
	12:00 noon UTC						

17	June 28	Hangzhou Spark	0	–	3	Shanghai Dragons	Online
	8:00 am UTC						

Countdown Cup qualifiers: 2–1

18	July 18	Hangzhou Spark	3	–	0	Seoul Dynasty	Online
	8:00 am UTC						

19	July 26	Hangzhou Spark	0	–	3	Chengdu Hunters	Online
	8:00 am UTC						

20	August 01	Hangzhou Spark	3	–	0	London Spitfire	Online
	10:00 am UTC						

August: 1–0

21	August 22	Hangzhou Spark	3	–	0	Seoul Dynasty	Online
	8:00 am UTC						

=== Midseason tournaments ===
2020 midseason tournaments game log
May Melee: 0–1

Quarterfinals	May 23	Hangzhou Spark	0	–	3	Seoul Dynasty	Online
	8:00 am UTC						

Summer Showdown: 0–1

Quarterfinals	July 04	Hangzhou Spark	0	–	3	New York Excelsior	Online
	12:00 noon UTC						

Countdown Cup: 2–1

Quarterfinals	August 08	Hangzhou Spark	3	–	2	Seoul Dynasty	Online
	10:00 am UTC						

Semifinals	August 09	Hangzhou Spark	3	–	1	Chengdu Hunters	Online
	10:00 am UTC						

Finals	August 09	Hangzhou Spark	0	–	4	Shanghai Dragons	Online
	12:00 noon UTC						

Bonus wins awarded: 2

=== Postseason ===
2020 playoff game log
Asia Play-ins: 0–1

Round 1	First-round bye

Round 2	September 05	Hangzhou Spark	0	–	3	Seoul Dynasty	Online
	11:00 am UTC						
