= 2020 Chengdu Hunters season =

- Head coach: Chang "Ray" Chia-Hua; Wu "Dokkaebi" Xiuqing
- Owner: Huya
- Conference: Pacific
- Division: East
- Region: Asia

Results
- Record: 7–14 (.333)
- Place: Asia: 6th; League: 14th
- May Melee: Quarterfinals
- Summer Showdown: Quarterfinals
- Countdown Cup: Semifinals
- Season Playoffs: Did not qualify
- Total Earnings: $15,000

The 2020 Chengdu Hunters season was the second season of Chengdu Hunters's existence in the Overwatch League and the team's first without head coach Wang "RUI" Xingrui. The Hunters planned to host two back-to-back homestand weekends at the Wuliangye Chengdu Performing Arts Centre, but all homestand events were canceled due to the COVID-19 pandemic.

== Preceding offseason ==
=== Organizational changes ===
On November 16, head coach Wang "RUI" Xingrui announced that he would be stepping down from his position due to health issues. On January 14, the team announced that Hunters' assistant coach Chang "Ray" Chia-Hua and LGE.Huya head coach Wu "Dokkaebi" Xiuqing would serve as the Hunters' co-head coaches. Additionally, former Hunters support player Li "Garry" Guan was added as an assistant coach.

=== Roster changes ===
The Hunters enter the new season with all ten of their players under contract. The OWL's deadline to exercise a team option is November 11, after which any players not retained will become a free agent. Free agency officially began on October 7.

The Hunters' first offseason change was announced on December 27 with the departures of DPS Zhihao "YangXiaoLong" Zhang and main tank Yansong "Jiqiren" Wei. On January 14, the Hunters revealed the signing of main tank player Chen "ATing" Shao-Hua and promotions of support players He "Molly" Chengzhi and Chen "Lengsa" Jingyi from their academy team LGE.Huya.

== Roster ==
2020 Chengdu Hunters roster
Players
Coaches

Role	No.	Handle	Name	Nationality
Damage	24	JinMu	Yi Hu	China
Damage	74	Baconjack	Lo Tzu-Heng	Taiwan
Damage	23	leave	Huang Xin	China
Tank	5	Ameng	Ding Menghan	China
Tank	53	ATing	Chen Shao-Hua	Taiwan
Tank	3	Elsa	Luo Wenjie	China
Tank	64	LateYoung	Ma Tianban	China
Support	29	Yveltal	Li Xianyao	China
Support	28	Lengsa	Chen Jingyi	China
Support	7	Kyo (C)	Kong Chunting	China
Support	66	Molly	He Chengzhi	China

Head coach

- Chang "Ray" Chia-Hua
- Wu "Dokkaebi" Xiuqing

Legend:
- (I) Inactive
- (S) Suspended
- (2W) Two-way player
- Substitute
- (injured) Injury / Illness

Latest roster transaction: January 15, 2020.

== Standings ==
Pos	Con	Team	Pld	W	BW	L	PCT	MW	ML	MT	MD	Qualification
1	PAC	Shanghai Dragons	21	19	8	2	0.905	59	15	1	+44	Advance to playoffs
2	PAC	Guangzhou Charge	21	14	4	7	0.667	44	39	1	+5	Advance to playoffs
3	ATL	New York Excelsior	21	13	3	8	0.619	50	30	2	+20	Advance to play-ins
4	PAC	Hangzhou Spark	21	10	2	11	0.476	36	40	2	−4	Advance to play-ins
5	PAC	Seoul Dynasty	21	9	3	12	0.429	33	40	2	−7	Advance to play-ins
6	PAC	Chengdu Hunters	21	7	1	14	0.333	33	47	1	−14	Advance to play-ins
7	ATL	London Spitfire	21	6	0	15	0.286	27	51	0	−24	Advance to play-ins

Source: The Overwatch League
Rules for classification: 1) Wins plus bonus wins 2) winning percentage (excluding bonus wins); 3) map differential; 4) head-to-head record; 5) head-to-head map differential

== Game log ==
=== Regular season ===
2020 game log (Regular season record: 7–14)
February–April: 3–7

1	March 28	Chengdu Hunters	2	–	3	Hangzhou Spark	Online
	9:30 am UTC						

2	March 29	Chengdu Hunters	3	–	0	Shanghai Dragons	Online
	8:00 am UTC						

3	April 05	Chengdu Hunters	2	–	3	Guangzhou Charge	Online
	10:00 am UTC						

4	April 06	Chengdu Hunters	1	–	3	Shanghai Dragons	Online
	8:00 am UTC						

5	April 11	Chengdu Hunters	0	–	3	Hangzhou Spark	Online
	8:00 am UTC						

6	April 12	Chengdu Hunters	3	–	1	Vancouver Titans	Online
	8:00 am UTC						

7	April 18	Chengdu Hunters	3	–	0	Guangzhou Charge	Online
	8:00 am UTC						

8	April 19	Chengdu Hunters	0	–	3	Shanghai Dragons	Online
	10:00 am UTC						

9	April 25	Chengdu Hunters	0	–	3	New York Excelsior	Online
	10:00 am UTC						

10	April 26	Chengdu Hunters	1	–	3	Hangzhou Spark	Online
	8:00 am UTC						

May Melee qualifiers: 1–3

11	May 03	Chengdu Hunters	1	–	3	New York Excelsior	Online
	10:00 am UTC						

12	May 09	Chengdu Hunters	0	–	3	London Spitfire	Online
	10:00 am UTC						

13	May 16	Chengdu Hunters	3	–	0	Seoul Dynasty	Online
	8:00 am UTC						

14	May 17	Chengdu Hunters	2	–	3	Guangzhou Charge	Online
	8:00 am UTC						

Summer Showdown qualifiers: 0–4

15	June 20	Chengdu Hunters	0	–	3	London Spitfire	Online
	10:00 am UTC						

16	June 21	Chengdu Hunters	2	–	3	Shanghai Dragons	Online
	10:00 am UTC						

17	June 27	Chengdu Hunters	1	–	3	Guangzhou Charge	Online
	8:00 am UTC						

18	June 28	Chengdu Hunters	0	–	3	Seoul Dynasty	Online
	10:00 am UTC						

Countdown Cup qualifiers: 3–0

19	July 18	Chengdu Hunters	3	–	2	New York Excelsior	Online
	12:00 noon UTC						

20	July 25	Chengdu Hunters	3	–	2	Seoul Dynasty	Online
	8:00 am UTC						

21	July 26	Chengdu Hunters	3	–	0	Hangzhou Spark	Online
	8:00 am UTC						

=== Midseason tournaments ===
2020 midseason tournaments game log
May Melee: 0–1

Quarterfinals	May 23	Chengdu Hunters	2	–	3	New York Excelsior	Online
	9:15 am UTC						

Summer Showdown: 0–1

Quarterfinals	July 04	Chengdu Hunters	0	–	3	Guangzhou Charge	Online
	8:00 am UTC						

Countdown Cup: 1–1

Quarterfinals	August 08	Chengdu Hunters	3	–	0	London Spitfire	Online
	8:00 am UTC						

Semifinals	August 09	Chengdu Hunters	1	–	3	Hangzhou Spark	Online
	10:00 am UTC						

Bonus wins awarded: 1

=== Postseason ===
2020 playoff game log
Asia Play-ins: 1–1

Round 1	September 04	Chengdu Hunters	3	–	1	London Spitfire	Online
	9:00 am UTC						

Round 2	September 05	Chengdu Hunters	2	–	3	New York Excelsior	Online
	9:00 am UTC						
