= Team CC =

Chinese esports team

- Founded: 2017
- Disbanded: 2021
- League: Overwatch Contenders
- Division: Pacific
- Region: China
- Team history: VETERAN; 2016; Invictus Gaming; 2016–2017; Team CC; 2017–2021
- Based in: Guangzhou, China
- Colors: Blue, red, black
- Owner: NetEase CC
- Affiliations: Shanghai Dragons; Fiat Lux
- Regional titles: 1; 2020 Season 1
- Interregional titles: 1; 2020 Gauntlet Asia

Team CC was a Chinese esports team for the video game Overwatch competing in Overwatch Contenders (OWC) and an academy team for the Shanghai Dragons of the Overwatch League (OWL). The franchise was initially two teams, VPGAME.ZZ and VPGAME.ONE, before they were acquired by Invictus Gaming and rebreanded to iG.Fire and iG.Ice, respectively. Subsequently, the two Invictus teams were acquired by NetEase CC, a live video streaming platform based in Guangzhou, China, and consolidated into the single team Team CC. The team played in the China region of OWC. Before disbanding, Team CC won one regional title and one interregional title.

== Franchise history ==
=== 2016: VPGAME ===
The franchise began in 2016 when Chinese esports organization vpgame established two Overwatch esport teams: VPGAME.ZZ and VPGAME.ONE.

=== 2016–2017: Invictus Gaming ===
On July 9, 2016, Invictus Gaming (iG) announced the acquisition of VPGAME's esports teams, rebranding VPGAME.ZZ to iG.Fire and VPGAME.ONE to iG.Ice. Both teams competed in the Overwatch Premier series, a series of professional Overwatch tournaments in China. iG.Fire qualified for the 2016 APAC Premier. After defeating Team Skadi's Gift in the first round of the double-elimination group stages, the team dropped the next two matches to Lunatic-Hai and Rogue to be eliminated from the tournament. iG.Ice qualified for the 2017 Spring Overwatch Premier Series, where the team made it past the group stages, but fell to Lucky Future in the quarterfinals.

=== 2017–2021: Team CC ===
On August 4, 2017, NetEase CC announced that they had acquired iG's Overwatch teams and consolidated both them into Team CC. Prior to the creation of Overwatch Contenders China, Team CC competed in the 2017 Summer Overwatch Premier Series. On January 10, 2018, the Shanghai Dragons revealed that Team CC would compete as their academy team for Overwatch Contenders China.

In their first season in Contenders China, Team CC posted a 3–2 record in the group stages and qualified for the playoffs. While the team was able to defeat Legend Young Beyond in the quarterfinals, they fell to LGD Gaming in the semifinals by a score of 1–3. In 2018 Season 2, CC was able to qualify for the playoffs again, but fell to The One Winner in the quarterfinals. In the final season of 2018, the team qualified for the playoffs for the third straight season and was able to defeat Big Time Regal Gaming in the quarterfinals, but they lost to Flag Gaming in the semifinals.

In 2019 Season 1, Team CC advanced past the group stages to the playoffs for the fourth consecutive season; however, the team fell in the quarterfinals to Hangzhou Spark's academy team Bilibili Gaming. The following season, Team CC finished first in their group and made it to the China regional finals, but they fell to the Chengdu Hunters' academy team LGE.Huya in the finals match. Following their finals loss, head coach Moon Byung-chul was promoted to the head coach of the Shanghai Dragons.

In 2020 Season 1, Team CC reached the playoffs after nearly doubling the point total of the next highest seed. The team lost to Flag Gaming in the upper bracket semifinals. The team ran through the lower bracket to reach the Grand Finals; Team CC won the Grand Finals by a score of 3–0 and claimed their first OWC title. In Season 2, Team CC reached the playoffs and finished as the runners-up. As a result of their performance in the 2020 season, the team qualified for The Gauntlet Asia, a tournament consisting of the top OWC teams from the Asia-Pacific regions. Team CC advanced past the group stages to the double-elimination knockout stage. In the knockouts, Team CC reached the Grand Finals, where they defeated Gen.G 4–1 and claimed their first interregional title.

In Late 2021 Team CC Disbanded.

== Seasons overview ==
Year	Season	Region	OWC regular season				Regional playoffs	Interregional events
Year	Season	Region	Finish (Note: Placements reflect standings in the team's respective group and not the entire region.)	Wins	Losses	Win %	Regional playoffs	Interregional events
Team CC
2018	1	China	2nd	3	2	.600	Semifinals	None held
2018	2	China	2nd	3	2	.600	Quarterfinals	None held
2018	3	China	2nd	4	1	.800	Semifinals	None held
2019	1	China	3rd	3	2	.600	Quarterfinals	Did not qualify
2019	2	China	1st	4	1	.800	Runners-up	Did not qualify
2020	1	China	1st	17	2	.895	Winners	None held
2020	2	China	1st	21	0	1.000	Runners-up	The Gauntlet Asia – Winners
Regular season record				55	10	.846		
Playoff record				11	7	.611		

== OWL buyouts and promotions ==
All Overwatch Contenders players are eligible to be promoted by their affiliated Overwatch League team or signed to any other Overwatch League during specified non-blackout periods.

2017

- Support Chen "Fiveking" Zhaoyu was signed by Shanghai Dragons on October 31.

2018

- Tank Ma "LateYoung" Tian-bin and support Kong "Kyo" Chun-ting were signed by new expansion franchise Chengdu Hunters on November 28.

2019

- Tank Wei "jiqiren" Yansong was signed by Chengdu Hunters on January 16.

2020

- Tank Lee "Fearless" Eui-seok was promoted to the Shanghai Dragons on January 19.
- Tank Jia "LiGe" Chengjie was signed by the Hangzhou Spark on November 16.
- Tank Qui "GA9A" Jiaxin and support Cao "Faraway1987" Jiale were signed by the Chengdu Hunters on November 27.

2021

- Tank Ham "SOMEONE" Jeong-wan was signed by the Florida Mayhem on November 18.
- Support Wu "Haoyoqian" Gengtuo was signed by the Hangzhou Spark on November 18.

== OWL affiliates ==
Team CC

- Shanghai Dragons (2018–present)
