= 2020 Guangzhou Charge season =

- Head coach: Cho Hyo-Jin
- General manager: I-Ting Liu
- Owner: Zhong Naixiong
- Conference: Pacific
- Division: East
- Region: Asia

Results
- Record: 14–7 (.667)
- Place: Asia: 2nd; League: 5th
- May Melee: Semifinals
- Summer Showdown: Champions
- Countdown Cup: Quarterfinals
- Season Playoffs: Asia Lower Round 1
- Total Earnings: $145,000

The 2020 Guangzhou Charge season was the second season of Guangzhou Charge's existence in the Overwatch League. The Charge planned to hold a league-high five homestands in the 2020 season; the firth three homestands were to be held at be held at the Foshan International Sports and Cultural Center, with the final two at Tianhe Gymnasium. However, due to the COVID-19 pandemic, all homestand events were cancelled.

== Preceding offseason ==
=== Roster changes ===
Free agents
Role	Player		Contract status	Date signed	2020 team
Role	Handle	Name	Contract status	Date signed	2020 team
Tank	Bischu	Aaron Kim	Free agent	November 15	Los Angeles Gladiators
Tank	Fragi	Joona Laine	Free agent	–	–
Tank	Hotba	Hong-Jun Choi	Free agent	November 15	New York Excelsior
Legend Re-signed/Retained by the Charge. Departed from the Charge.

The Charge enter the new season with three free agents, six players which they have the option to retain for another year, and two players under contract. The OWL's deadline to exercise a team option is November 11, after which any players not retained will become a free agent. Free agency officially began on October 7.

On November 11, the Charge announced the departure of several players. The team did not re-sign free agents Choi "HOTBA" Hong-jun, Joona "fragi" Laine, and Kim "Bischu" Hyung-seok. Additionally, they released Lizhen "OnlyWish" Chen, and Lee "Rise" Won-jae retired from professional Overwatch. The Charge's first acquisitions of the season were announced on November 14 with the signings of former Philadelphia Fusion support Alberto "neptuNo" González and off-tank Nam "Cr0ng" Ki-cheol, along with the promotion of Qi "Wya" Haomiao from their academy team T1w.GZA.

=== Organizational changes ===
On October 30, the Charge announced that they had parted ways with assistant coach Rohit "Curryshot" Nathani.

== Homestand events ==
In August 2019, the Charge announced that they would hold a league-high five homestand events; the events would take place at Tianhe Gymnasium and the Foshan International Sports and Cultural Center. Due to the COVID-19 pandemic, the Charge decided to relocate their team to South Korea with no specific return time. Additionally, the league cancelled all February and March matches planned in China, which cancelled the Charge's first three homestands; all were to at the Foshan International Sports and Cultural Center from February 22 to 23, March 14 to 15, and March 21 to 22. The Overwatch League announced that the cancelled homestand events in China would be rescheduled for Weeks 5 through 7 in a studio in Seoul, South Korea; however, due to the COVID-19 pandemic in South Korea, these matches were cancelled as well.

== Roster ==
2020 Guangzhou Charge roster
Players
Coaches

Role	No.	Handle	Name	Nationality
Damage	0	Eileen	Ou Yiliang	China
Damage	20	Happy	Lee Jeong-woo	South Korea
Damage	7	Krystal (2W)	Cai Shilong	China
Damage	42	nero	Zwarg, Charlie	United States
Tank	14	Rio	Oh Seung-pyo	South Korea
Tank	10	Cr0ng	Nam Ki-cheol	South Korea
Support	11	Wya (2W)	Qi Haomiao	China
Support	1	shu	Kim Jin-seo	South Korea
Support	3	Chara (C)	Kim Jung-yeon	South Korea
Support	27	neptuNo	González, Alberto	Spain

Head coach

- Cho Hyo-Jin

Legend:
- (I) Inactive
- (S) Suspended
- (2W) Two-way player
- Substitute
- (injured) Injury / Illness

Latest roster transaction: July 14, 2020.

== Standings ==
Pos	Con	Team	Pld	W	BW	L	PCT	MW	ML	MT	MD	Qualification
1	PAC	Shanghai Dragons	21	19	8	2	0.905	59	15	1	+44	Advance to playoffs
2	PAC	Guangzhou Charge	21	14	4	7	0.667	44	39	1	+5	Advance to playoffs
3	ATL	New York Excelsior	21	13	3	8	0.619	50	30	2	+20	Advance to play-ins
4	PAC	Hangzhou Spark	21	10	2	11	0.476	36	40	2	−4	Advance to play-ins
5	PAC	Seoul Dynasty	21	9	3	12	0.429	33	40	2	−7	Advance to play-ins
6	PAC	Chengdu Hunters	21	7	1	14	0.333	33	47	1	−14	Advance to play-ins
7	ATL	London Spitfire	21	6	0	15	0.286	27	51	0	−24	Advance to play-ins

Source: The Overwatch League
Rules for classification: 1) Wins plus bonus wins 2) winning percentage (excluding bonus wins); 3) map differential; 4) head-to-head record; 5) head-to-head map differential

== Game log ==
=== Regular season ===
2020 game log (Regular season record: 14–7)
February–April: 4–6

1	March 28	Guangzhou Charge	0	–	3	Shanghai Dragons	Online
	8:00 am UTC						

2	March 29	Guangzhou Charge	3	–	2	Hangzhou Spark	Online
	10:00 am UTC						

3	April 05	Guangzhou Charge	3	–	2	Chengdu Hunters	Online
	10:00 am UTC						

4	April 06	Guangzhou Charge	2	–	3	Hangzhou Spark	Online
	10:00 am UTC						

5	April 11	Guangzhou Charge	3	–	0	Vancouver Titans	Online
	10:00 am UTC						

6	April 12	Guangzhou Charge	0	–	3	Shanghai Dragons	Online
	10:00 am UTC						

7	April 18	Guangzhou Charge	0	–	3	Chengdu Hunters	Online
	8:00 am UTC						

8	April 19	Guangzhou Charge	3	–	1	Hangzhou Spark	Online
	8:00 am UTC						

9	April 25	Guangzhou Charge	0	–	3	Shanghai Dragons	Online
	9:00 am UTC						

10	April 26	Guangzhou Charge	0	–	3	New York Excelsior	Online
	10:30 am UTC						

May Melee qualifiers: 4–0

11	May 02	Guangzhou Charge	3	–	0	Seoul Dynasty	Online
	8:00 am UTC						

12	May 09	Guangzhou Charge	3	–	1	New York Excelsior	Online
	12:00 noon UTC						

13	May 10	Guangzhou Charge	3	–	1	London Spitfire	Online
	10:00 am UTC						

14	May 17	Guangzhou Charge	3	–	2	Chengdu Hunters	Online
	8:00 am UTC						

Summer Showdown qualifiers: 4–0

15	June 20	Guangzhou Charge	3	–	2	Seoul Dynasty	Online
	8:00 am UTC						

16	June 21	Guangzhou Charge	3	–	2	Hangzhou Spark	Online
	8:00 am UTC						

17	June 27	Guangzhou Charge	3	–	1	Chengdu Hunters	Online
	8:00 am UTC						

18	June 28	Guangzhou Charge	3	–	2	New York Excelsior	Online
	12:00 noon UTC						

Countdown Cup qualifiers: 2–1

19	July 18	Guangzhou Charge	3	–	1	London Spitfire	Online
	10:00 am UTC						

20	July 25	Guangzhou Charge	0	–	3	New York Excelsior	Online
	12:00 noon UTC						

21	August 01	Guangzhou Charge	3	–	1	Seoul Dynasty	Online
	8:00 am UTC						

=== Midseason tournaments ===
2020 midseason tournaments game log
May Melee: 0–1

Quarterfinals	First-round bye

Semifinals	May 24	Guangzhou Charge	2	–	3	Seoul Dynasty	Online
	8:00 am UTC						

Summer Showdown: 3–0

Quarterfinals	July 04	Guangzhou Charge	3	–	0	Chengdu Hunters	Online
	8:00 am UTC						

Semifinals	July 05	Guangzhou Charge	3	–	0	New York Excelsior	Online
	10:00 am UTC						

Finals	July 05	Guangzhou Charge	4	–	2	Shanghai Dragons	Online
	12:00 noon UTC						

Countdown Cup: 0–1

Quarterfinals	August 08	Guangzhou Charge	2	–	3	New York Excelsior	Online
	12:00 noon UTC						

Bonus wins awarded: 4

=== Postseason ===
2020 playoff game log
Asia Bracket: 0–2

Upper Round 1	September 06	Guangzhou Charge	0	–	3	Seoul Dynasty	Online
	11:00 am UTC						

Lower Round 1	September 12	Guangzhou Charge	0	–	3	New York Excelsior	Online
	9:00 am UTC						
