= 2020 Overwatch League season =

- League: Overwatch League
- Sport: Overwatch
- Duration: February 8 – August 23; September 3 – October 10 (Playoffs)
- Matches: 21
- Teams: 20
- TV partners: Major League Gaming; YouTube

Regular season
- Top seed: Shanghai Dragons (A); Philadelphia Fusion (NA)
- Season MVP: Kim "Fleta" Byung-sun

Midseason tournament champions
- May Melee: Shanghai Dragons (A); San Francisco Shock (NA)
- Summer Showdown: Guangzhou Charge (A); Paris Eternal (NA)
- Countdown Cup: Shanghai Dragons (A); San Francisco Shock (NA)

Grand Finals
- Venue: Online
- Champions: San Francisco Shock
- Runners-up: Seoul Dynasty
- Finals MVP: Kwon "Striker" Nam-joo

Overwatch League seasons
- ← 2019 2021 →

The 2020 Overwatch League season is the third season of the Overwatch League (OWL), a professional esports league for the video game Overwatch. The regular season began on February 8, 2020, and concluded on August 23. It was the first season that the league implemented a city-based, home-and-away format, with teams traveling between the global home venues to play regular season matches, making the OWL the first major esports league to feature such a format. However, this format was abandoned on March 31 due to the COVID-19 pandemic, and all matches were thereafter played online, with the league introducing three midseason tournaments.

An expanded 20-team postseason began on September 3. The Grand Finals bracket began on October 8, with the Grand Finals occurring on October 10. The San Francisco Shock won the Grand Finals over the Seoul Dynasty to win their second straight OWL championship.

== League changes announced prior to season ==
=== Schedule ===
Prior to the 2020 season, the majority of all OWL matches took place at Blizzard Arena in Burbank, California. In the 2019 season, three homestand weekends took place – the Dallas Fuel Homestand Weekend hosted by the Dallas Fuel, the Atlanta Reign Homestand Weekend hosted by the Atlanta Reign, and the Kit Kat Rivalry Weekend hosted by the Los Angeles Valiant – in efforts to test how a completely localized match schedule would work. For the 2020 season, the league adopted a "homestand" model. Every team was to host two to five homestands throughout the season. Each team would still play 28 matches and would be responsible for the selection and operation of their respective home venues. In addition to homestands, every team would have been required to host at least three team events for the community in their respective home cities. The season marked the first time that a major esports league featured a city-based, home-and-away format.

In the 2018 and 2019 seasons, the Overwatch League equally divided teams into two divisions – the Atlantic and Pacific. With the large amount of travelling that was to take place in the homestand model, the Atlantic and Pacific Divisions were renamed to the Atlantic and Pacific Conferences, and each conference was equally subdivided into two divisions, the Pacific East and West Divisions and the Atlantic North and South Divisions. The smaller divisions were implemented in efforts to reduce the amount of time and money spent on travel.

With the large amount of localized play and travel, the season was no longer split into four stages. Instead, a midseason tournament was to be held at the same time as the All-Star Weekend. The tournament would have featured the Atlantic and Pacific Conference leaders as well as the next best two teams, regardless of conference, based on the regular season standings through Week 10.

=== Rules ===
In the prior seasons, the winner of each match was determined by a best-of-four map series, with a fifth tiebreaker map, if necessary. The league announced at BlizzCon that match winners would be determined by a first-to-three map series, similar to that of the 2019 playoffs. Activision Blizzard senior director of product strategy and business operations Jon Spector noted that due to the elimination of Stage Playoffs, map differential would be less important, as it is not very likely that many teams would have the same regular season record heading into the playoffs. Every match still begins with a control map followed by a rotation between assault, escort, and hybrid maps. Similar to previous seasons, should a match still be tied after four maps, a fifth tiebreaker map will be played on a control map.

After the announcement of hero pools in Overwatch for the competitive season starting in February 2020, the league announced that it would adopt the hero pool system beginning in the fourth week of play in March in effort to prevent stagnant metas. Each week, the league randomly selects one tank, two damage, and one support hero from a list of the most played heroes in the OWL from the previous two weeks of play; these heroes are then considered "banned" and cannot be selected during that week. Banned heroes cannot be banned in the immediately-following week. The hero pool system is only used in the regular season, and will not be enforced during the midseason tournament, the play-in tournament, and the playoffs.

=== Prize pool ===
The total prize pool remained unchanged at US$5,000,000, although the allocation changed due to the discontinuation of Stage Playoffs. The Midseason Tournament champions will win $500,000, the runners-up will win $250,000, and the third and fourth place teams will earn $150,000. The All-Star event will have a prize pool for the first time, with a total pool of $250,000. For the postseason earnings, the Grand Champion team will earn $1.5 million (up from $1.1 million), second place will earn $800,000 (up from $600,000), third place will earn $500,000 (up from $450,000), fourth place will earn $300,000 (down from $350,000), fifth and sixth place will earn $200,000 (down from $300,000), and seventh and eighth place will earn $100,000 (down from $200,000).

=== Broadcasting ===
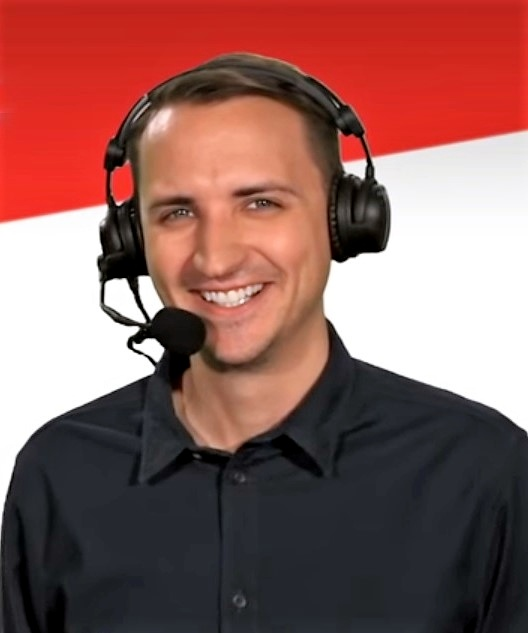
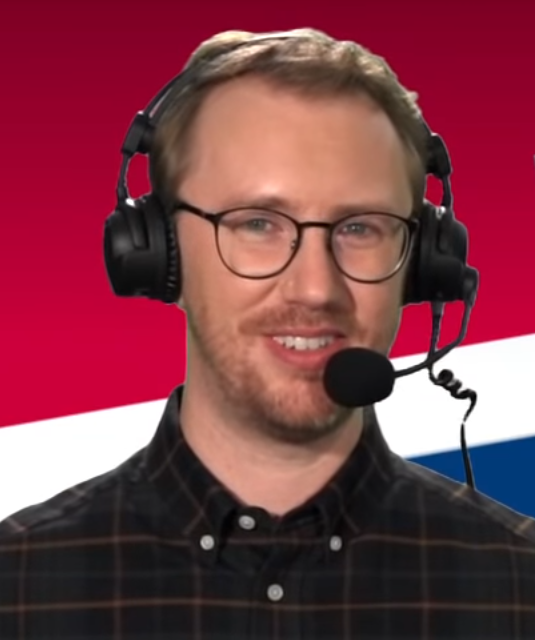
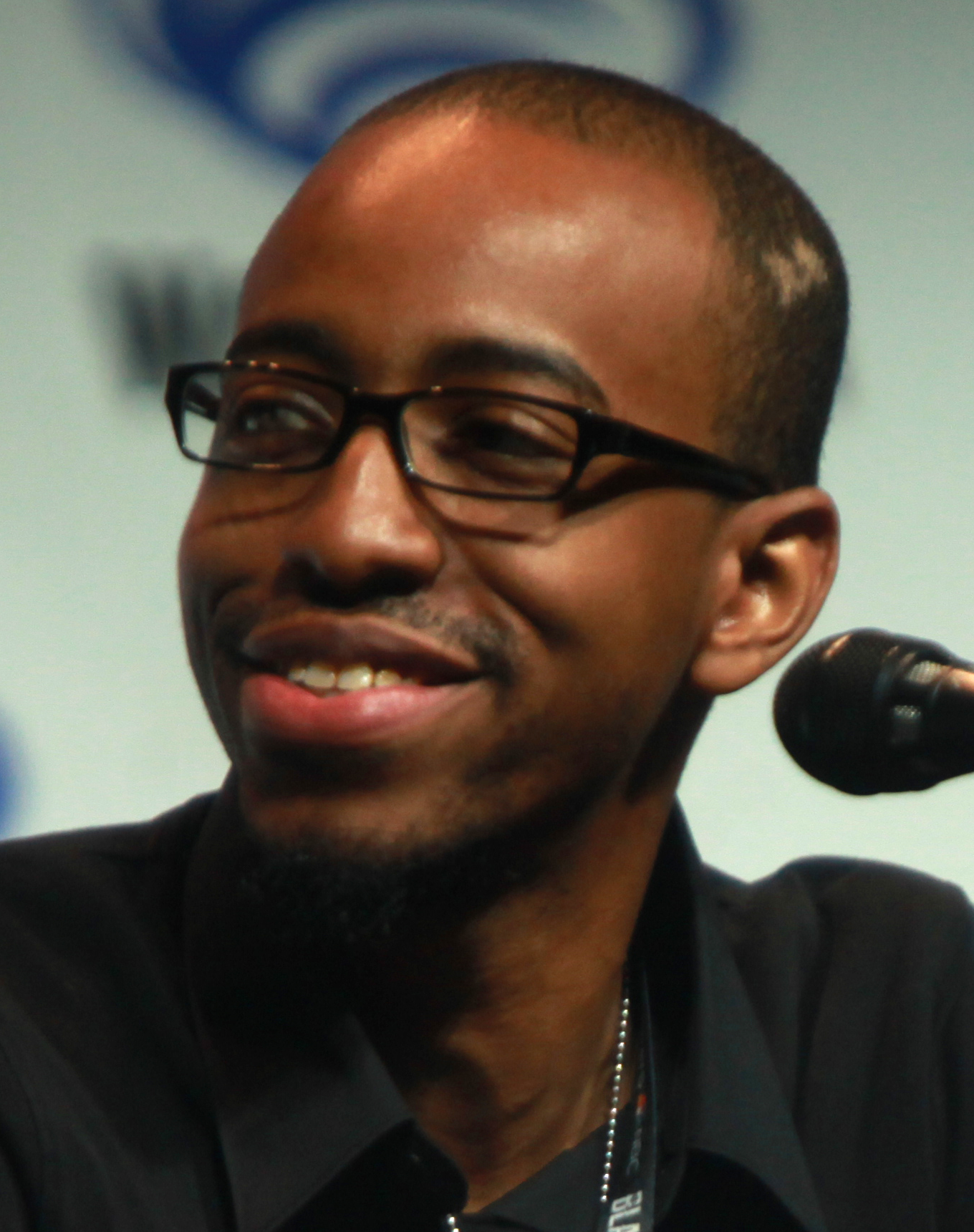
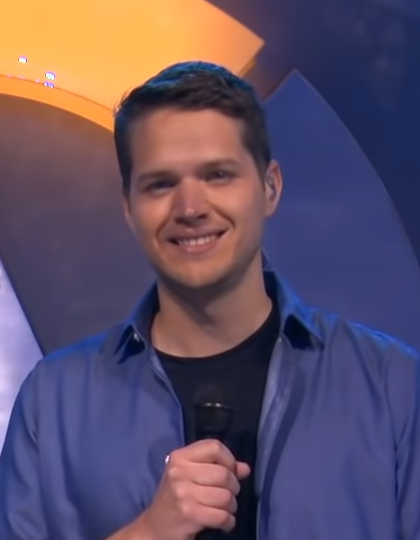
Shoutcasters Christopher "MonteCristo" Mykles and Erik "DoA" Lonnquist and hosts Malik Forte and Chris Puckett (left to right) left the broadcast team prior to the season.

Prior to the start of the season, several of the shoutcasters for the League, including Malik Forté, Auguste "Semmler" Massonnat, Christopher "MonteCristo" Mykles, Erik "DoA" Lonnquist, and Chris Puckett, left for various reasons ranging from dissatisfaction with their salaries to concerns over the new management of the league following Nate Nanzer's departure as league commissioner in 2019.

YouTube has replaced Twitch as exclusive broadcaster of the league, as part of a deal covering all Activision Blizzard esports events. The company also announced a deal to make Google Cloud Platform the preferred infrastructure provider for its game servers.

== Rule and schedule changes due to COVID-19 ==
=== Homestand events ===
Due to the COVID-19 pandemic, Blizzard cancelled all four homestand events planned in China in February and March 2020. Four of the teams in the league are based in China, where travel restrictions and quarantines from the outbreak were enacted; the restrictions affected teams that were traveling to China to play matches there. Two of the Chinese teams, Guangzhou Charge and Shanghai Dragons, announced the relocation of their teams to South Korea, while the Chengdu Hunters remained in China. The cancelled matches were originally planned to be rescheduled in Seoul, South Korea during two weekends in March, with some matches being played during Seoul Dynasty's homestand event the same month. However, Blizzard later cancelled all South Korean events in March 2020, including the Dynasty homestand, over concerns of the outbreak. In March, French Health Minister Olivier Véran announced that all public gatherings of more than 1,000 people were banned in the country until April 15; the ban effectively cancelled the Paris Eternal homestand event that was scheduled to be held April 11–12. After the World Health Organization declared the COVID-19 virus a global pandemic on March 11, the Overwatch League announced that it would be cancelling all remaining scheduled live events in March and April.

=== Regions ===
For the March and April matches, the league abandoned the Atlantic and Pacific conferences and instead divided teams into three groups based on geography – Atlantic, Pacific, and China – where teams would only play intra-regionally in an effort to reduce latency. Due to the inequity of the number of games played by each team, the All-Star Weekend was moved to the postseason, while the Midseason Tournament was canceled altogether. On March 31, the Overwatch League announced that they were abandoning the Homestand model entirely in favor of moving matches for the remainder of the season online.

=== Midseason tournaments ===
On April 26, the league introduced the league announced a new tournament structure for the month of May called the May Melee. The league divided the 20 teams into two geographical regions, 13 in North America and 7 in Asia, where teams would only play interregionally. After three weeks of play, the top teams from each region played in their respective regional tournament. Teams earned $5000 for each win in the tournaments (with receiving a bye counting as a win) and earned a bonus win towards their regular season standings for each win after, and including, the quarterfinals. There were no hero pools for the tournaments, and winners were determined by which team won three maps, except for the finals, which were determined by which team won four maps. Following the conclusion of the May Melee, the league announced two more tournaments with the same ruleset for the months of June and July – the Summer Showdown and the Countdown Cup, respectively.

=== Season playoffs ===
On July 15, the league announced its playoff format for the season. All 20 teams played in the postseason, with teams divided by the same two regions as the three midseason tournaments. The lowest seeds played in regional play-in tournaments. Twelve total teams qualified for the season playoffs split into two regional brackets. In the North America region, eight teams qualified for the North America Bracket, and in the Asia region, four teams qualified for the Asia Bracket. Each playoff bracket is a double-elimination tournament. However, the winners of the upper and lower finals in each respective bracket did not face each other. Instead, they qualified for the Grand Finals bracket – another double-elimination tournament. The winners of the upper and lower bracket in the Grand Finals bracket will play in the Grand Finals match.

== Regular season ==
North America

Pos	Con	Team	Pld	W	BW	L	PCT	MW	ML	MT	MD	Qualification
1	ATL	Philadelphia Fusion	21	19	5	2	0.905	59	19	0	+40	Advance to playoffs
2	PAC	San Francisco Shock	21	18	7	3	0.857	56	17	2	+39	Advance to playoffs
3	ATL	Paris Eternal	21	15	4	6	0.714	50	31	0	+19	Advance to playoffs
4	ATL	Florida Mayhem	21	14	3	7	0.667	48	30	0	+18	Advance to playoffs
5	PAC	Los Angeles Valiant	21	11	1	10	0.524	41	41	0	0	Advance to playoffs
6	PAC	Los Angeles Gladiators	21	11	0	10	0.524	43	39	5	+4	Advance to play-ins
7	ATL	Atlanta Reign	21	10	0	11	0.476	43	35	0	+8	Advance to play-ins
8	PAC	Dallas Fuel	21	9	0	12	0.429	35	44	0	−9	Advance to play-ins
9	ATL	Toronto Defiant	21	7	1	14	0.333	32	48	0	−16	Advance to play-ins
10	ATL	Houston Outlaws	21	6	0	15	0.286	32	50	3	−18	Advance to play-ins
11	PAC	Vancouver Titans	21	6	0	15	0.286	23	48	0	−25	Advance to play-ins
12	ATL	Washington Justice	21	4	0	17	0.190	21	54	1	−33	Advance to play-ins
13	ATL	Boston Uprising	21	2	0	19	0.095	14	61	4	−47	Advance to play-ins

Source: The Overwatch League
Rules for classification: 1) Wins plus bonus wins 2) winning percentage (excluding bonus wins); 3) map differential; 4) head-to-head record; 5) head-to-head map differential

Asia

Pos	Con	Team	Pld	W	BW	L	PCT	MW	ML	MT	MD	Qualification
1	PAC	Shanghai Dragons	21	19	8	2	0.905	59	15	1	+44	Advance to playoffs
2	PAC	Guangzhou Charge	21	14	4	7	0.667	44	39	1	+5	Advance to playoffs
3	ATL	New York Excelsior	21	13	3	8	0.619	50	30	2	+20	Advance to play-ins
4	PAC	Hangzhou Spark	21	10	2	11	0.476	36	40	2	−4	Advance to play-ins
5	PAC	Seoul Dynasty	21	9	3	12	0.429	33	40	2	−7	Advance to play-ins
6	PAC	Chengdu Hunters	21	7	1	14	0.333	33	47	1	−14	Advance to play-ins
7	ATL	London Spitfire	21	6	0	15	0.286	27	51	0	−24	Advance to play-ins

Source: The Overwatch League
Rules for classification: 1) Wins plus bonus wins 2) winning percentage (excluding bonus wins); 3) map differential; 4) head-to-head record; 5) head-to-head map differential

=== May Melee ===
==== Qualifiers ====
North America

Pos	Con	Team	Pld	W	L	PCT	MW	ML	MT	MD	Qualification
1	PAC	San Francisco Shock	3	3	0	1.00	9	1	1	+8	Advance to quarterfinals
2	ATL	Florida Mayhem	3	3	0	1.00	9	1	0	+8	Advance to quarterfinals
3	ATL	Philadelphia Fusion	3	3	0	1.00	9	3	0	+6	Advance to quarterfinals
4	PAC	Los Angeles Valiant	3	3	0	1.00	9	4	0	+5	Advance to quarterfinals
5	ATL	Paris Eternal	3	2	1	0.67	8	4	0	+4	Advance to knockouts
6	ATL	Atlanta Reign	3	1	2	0.33	5	6	0	−1	Advance to knockouts
7	PAC	Los Angeles Gladiators	3	1	2	0.33	6	7	1	−1	Advance to knockouts
8	PAC	Dallas Fuel	3	1	2	0.33	4	6	0	−2	Advance to knockouts
9	ATL	Houston Outlaws	3	1	2	0.33	3	6	1	−3	Advance to knockouts
10	ATL	Washington Justice	3	1	2	0.33	4	7	0	−3	Advance to knockouts
11	ATL	Boston Uprising	3	1	2	0.33	3	8	1	−5	Advance to knockouts
12	ATL	Toronto Defiant	3	0	3	0.00	4	9	0	−5	Advance to qualifying match
13	PAC	Vancouver Titans	3	0	3	0.00	1	9	0	−8	Advance to qualifying match

Source: The Overwatch League
Rules for classification: 1) winning percentage; 2) map differential; 3) head-to-head record; 4) head-to-head map differential

Asia

Pos	Con	Team	Pld	W	L	PCT	MW	ML	MT	MD	Qualification
1	PAC	Guangzhou Charge	4	4	0	1.00	12	4	0	+8	Advance to semifinals
2	PAC	Shanghai Dragons	4	3	1	0.75	11	5	0	+6	Advance to quarterfinals
3	ATL	New York Excelsior	4	2	2	0.50	9	8	1	+1	Advance to quarterfinals
4	PAC	Hangzhou Spark	4	2	2	0.50	7	6	0	+1	Advance to quarterfinals
5	PAC	Chengdu Hunters	4	1	3	0.25	6	9	1	−3	Advance to quarterfinals
6	ATL	London Spitfire	4	1	3	0.25	4	9	0	−5	Advance to quarterfinals
7	PAC	Seoul Dynasty	4	1	3	0.25	3	11	0	−8	Advance to quarterfinals

Source: The Overwatch League
Rules for classification: 1) winning percentage; 2) map differential; 3) head-to-head record; 4) head-to-head map differential

==== Knockouts ====
North America

Knockouts
5	Paris Eternal	3
11	Boston Uprising	2
6	Atlanta Reign	3
12	Toronto Defiant	0
7	Los Angeles Gladiators	3
10	Washington Justice	0
8	Dallas Fuel	3
9	Houston Outlaws	1

Quarterfinals
1	San Francisco Shock	3
8	Dallas Fuel	1
4	Los Angeles Valiant	3
5	Paris Eternal	2
3	Philadelphia Fusion	3
7	Los Angeles Gladiators	1
2	Florida Mayhem	3
6	Atlanta Reign	1

Semifinals
1	San Francisco Shock	3
4	Los Angeles Valiant	0
3	Philadelphia Fusion	1
2	Florida Mayhem	3

Final
1	San Francisco Shock	4
2	Florida Mayhem	2

Asia

Quarterfinals
4	Hangzhou Spark	0
7	Seoul Dynasty	3
3	New York Excelsior	3
5	Chengdu Hunters	2
2	Shanghai Dragons	3
6	London Spitfire	2

Semifinals
1	Guangzhou Charge	2
7	Seoul Dynasty	3
3	New York Excelsior	0
2	Shanghai Dragons	3

Final
7	Seoul Dynasty	3
2	Shanghai Dragons	4

=== Summer Showdown ===
==== Qualifiers ====
North America

Pos	Con	Team	Pld	W	L	PCT	MW	ML	MT	MD	Qualification
1	PAC	San Francisco Shock	3	3	0	1.00	9	0	0	+9	Advance to quarterfinals
2	ATL	Atlanta Reign	3	2	1	0.67	7	3	0	+4	Advance to quarterfinals
3	ATL	Philadelphia Fusion	3	2	1	0.67	6	3	0	+3	Advance to quarterfinals
4	PAC	Vancouver Titans	3	2	1	0.67	6	3	0	+3	Advance to quarterfinals
5	PAC	Los Angeles Valiant	3	2	1	0.67	7	4	0	+3	Advance to knockouts
6	PAC	Los Angeles Gladiators	3	2	1	0.67	7	5	1	+2	Advance to knockouts
7	ATL	Florida Mayhem	3	2	1	0.67	7	6	0	+1	Advance to knockouts
8	ATL	Paris Eternal	3	2	1	0.67	6	6	0	0	Advance to knockouts
9	PAC	Dallas Fuel	3	1	2	0.33	4	6	0	−2	Advance to knockouts
10	ATL	Houston Outlaws	3	1	2	0.33	5	7	0	−2	Advance to knockouts
11	ATL	Toronto Defiant	3	1	2	0.33	3	6	0	−3	Advance to knockouts
12	ATL	Boston Uprising	3	0	3	0.00	2	9	0	−7	Advance to qualifying match
13	ATL	Washington Justice	3	0	3	0.00	1	9	1	−8	Advance to qualifying match

Source: The Overwatch League
Rules for classification: 1) winning percentage; 2) map differential; 3) head-to-head record; 4) head-to-head map differential

Asia

Pos	Con	Team	Pld	W	L	PCT	MW	ML	MT	MD	Qualification
1	PAC	Shanghai Dragons	4	4	0	1.00	12	3	0	+9	Advance to semifinals
2	PAC	Guangzhou Charge	4	4	0	1.00	12	7	0	+5	Advance to quarterfinals
3	ATL	New York Excelsior	4	2	2	0.50	10	7	1	+3	Advance to quarterfinals
4	ATL	London Spitfire	4	2	2	0.50	7	6	0	+1	Advance to quarterfinals
5	PAC	Seoul Dynasty	4	1	3	0.25	6	9	0	−3	Advance to quarterfinals
6	PAC	Hangzhou Spark	4	1	3	0.25	5	12	1	−7	Advance to quarterfinals
7	PAC	Chengdu Hunters	4	0	4	0.00	3	12	0	−9	Advance to quarterfinals

Source: The Overwatch League
Rules for classification: 1) winning percentage; 2) map differential; 3) head-to-head record; 4) head-to-head map differential

==== Knockouts ====
North America

Knockouts
5	Los Angeles Valiant	1
11	Toronto Defiant	3
6	Los Angeles Gladiators	1
13	Washington Justice	3
7	Florida Mayhem	1
10	Houston Outlaws	3
8	Paris Eternal	3
9	Dallas Fuel	1

Quarterfinals
1	San Francisco Shock	3
13	Washington Justice	0
4	Vancouver Titans	1
8	Paris Eternal	3
3	Philadelphia Fusion	3
10	Houston Outlaws	0
2	Atlanta Reign	2
11	Toronto Defiant	3

Semifinals
1	San Francisco Shock	2
8	Paris Eternal	3
3	Philadelphia Fusion	3
11	Toronto Defiant	0

Final
8	Paris Eternal	4
3	Philadelphia Fusion	3

Asia

Quarterfinals
4	London Spitfire	1
5	Seoul Dynasty	3
2	Guangzhou Charge	3
7	Chengdu Hunters	0
3	New York Excelsior	3
6	Hangzhou Spark	0

Semifinals
1	Shanghai Dragons	3
5	Seoul Dynasty	0
2	Guangzhou Charge	3
3	New York Excelsior	0

Final
1	Shanghai Dragons	2
2	Guangzhou Charge	4

=== Countdown Cup ===
==== Qualifiers ====
North America

Pos	Con	Team	Pld	W	L	PCT	MW	ML	MT	MD	Qualification
1	PAC	San Francisco Shock	4	4	0	1.00	12	1	0	+11	Advance to quarterfinals
2	ATL	Paris Eternal	4	4	0	1.00	12	1	0	+11	Advance to quarterfinals
3	ATL	Philadelphia Fusion	4	4	0	1.00	12	2	0	+10	Advance to quarterfinals
4	ATL	Florida Mayhem	4	3	1	0.75	10	5	0	+5	Advance to quarterfinals
5	ATL	Atlanta Reign	4	3	1	0.75	10	5	0	+5	Advance to knockouts
6	PAC	Los Angeles Valiant	4	2	2	0.50	6	8	0	−2	Advance to knockouts
7	PAC	Dallas Fuel	4	2	2	0.50	7	9	0	−2	Advance to knockouts
8	ATL	Toronto Defiant	4	2	2	0.50	6	8	0	−2	Advance to knockouts
9	PAC	Los Angeles Gladiators	4	1	3	0.25	6	9	0	−3	Advance to knockouts
10	ATL	Washington Justice	4	1	3	0.25	4	10	0	−6	Advance to knockouts
11	ATL	Houston Outlaws	4	0	4	0.00	5	12	0	−7	Advance to knockouts
12	PAC	Vancouver Titans	4	0	4	0.00	2	12	0	−10	Advance to qualifying match
13	ATL	Boston Uprising	4	0	4	0.00	2	12	1	−10	Advance to qualifying match

Source: The Overwatch League
Rules for classification: 1) winning percentage; 2) map differential; 3) head-to-head record; 4) head-to-head map differential

Asia

Pos	Con	Team	Pld	W	L	PCT	MW	ML	MT	MD	Qualification
1	PAC	Shanghai Dragons	3	3	0	1.00	9	3	0	+6	Advance to semifinals
2	PAC	Chengdu Hunters	3	3	0	1.00	9	4	0	+5	Advance to quarterfinals
3	PAC	Hangzhou Spark	3	2	1	0.67	6	3	0	+3	Advance to quarterfinals
4	PAC	Guangzhou Charge	3	2	1	0.67	6	5	1	+1	Advance to quarterfinals
5	ATL	New York Excelsior	3	1	2	0.33	6	6	0	0	Advance to quarterfinals
6	ATL	London Spitfire	3	0	3	0.00	3	9	0	−6	Advance to quarterfinals
7	PAC	Seoul Dynasty	3	0	3	0.00	2	9	1	−7	Advance to quarterfinals

Source: The Overwatch League
Rules for classification: 1) winning percentage; 2) map differential; 3) head-to-head record; 4) head-to-head map differential

==== Knockouts ====
North America

Knockouts
5	Atlanta Reign	3
12	Vancouver Titans	0
6	Los Angeles Valiant	3
11	Houston Outlaws	0
7	Dallas Fuel	3
10	Washington Justice	2
8	Toronto Defiant	2
9	Los Angeles Gladiators	3

Quarterfinals
1	San Francisco Shock	3
7	Dallas Fuel	0
4	Florida Mayhem	3
5	Atlanta Reign	0
2	Paris Eternal	3
6	Los Angeles Valiant	1
3	Philadelphia Fusion	3
9	Los Angeles Gladiators	0

Semifinals
1	San Francisco Shock	3
4	Florida Mayhem	1
2	Paris Eternal	1
3	Philadelphia Fusion	3

Final
1	San Francisco Shock	4
3	Philadelphia Fusion	2

Asia

Quarterfinals
4	Guangzhou Charge	2
5	New York Excelsior	3
3	Hangzhou Spark	3
7	Seoul Dynasty	2
2	Chengdu Hunters	3
6	London Spitfire	0

Semifinals
1	Shanghai Dragons	3
5	New York Excelsior	0
3	Hangzhou Spark	3
2	Chengdu Hunters	1

Final
1	Shanghai Dragons	4
3	Hangzhou Spark	0

== Postseason ==
=== Play-in tournaments ===
The play-in tournaments were two regional single-elimination tournaments that took place September 3–5. All match winners were determined by which team wins three maps. The winners of each first round match advanced to the second round. The teams that qualified for a bye into the second round each selected which opponent they would face between the winners of the first round (or the Toronto Defiant or Seoul Dynasty in the North America and Asia region, respectively). The winners of the second round advanced to the playoffs.

North America bracket

Round 1 September 3
10	Houston Outlaws	1
13	Boston Uprising	3
12	Washington Justice	3
11	Vancouver Titans	0

Round 2 September 4
6	Los Angeles Gladiators	3
9	Toronto Defiant	2
7	Atlanta Reign	3
13	Boston Uprising	1
8	Dallas Fuel	0
12	Washington Justice	3

Asia

Round 1 September 4
6	Chengdu Hunters	3
7	London Spitfire	1

Round 2 September 5
3	New York Excelsior	3
6	Chengdu Hunters	2
4	Hangzhou Spark	0
5	Seoul Dynasty	3

=== Playoffs ===
The playoffs will be contested by twelve teams – eight from the North America region and four from the Asia region. The top two teams from each region's respective playoff bracket will qualify for the Grand Finals bracket, where the final two teams in the Grand Finals bracket will play in the Grand Finals match.

North America

Upper Round 1 September 5	Upper Round 2 September 6	Upper Final; September 12
1	Philadelphia Fusion	3
6	Los Angeles Gladiators	0
1	Philadelphia Fusion	3
5	Los Angeles Valiant	0
4	Florida Mayhem	2
5	Los Angeles Valiant	3
1	Philadelphia Fusion	1
2	San Francisco Shock	3
2	San Francisco Shock	3
8	Washington Justice	2
2	San Francisco Shock	3
7	Atlanta Reign	1
3	Paris Eternal	2
7	Atlanta Reign	3
Lower Round 1 September 6	Lower Round 2 September 11	Lower Round 3 September 12	Lower Final; September 13
7	Atlanta Reign	0
4	Florida Mayhem	3	4	Florida Mayhem	3	1	Philadelphia Fusion	3
6	Los Angeles Gladiators	0	4	Florida Mayhem	0	8	Washington Justice	0
8	Washington Justice	3
5	Los Angeles Valiant	1
3	Paris Eternal	0	8	Washington Justice	3
8	Washington Justice	3

Asia bracket

Upper Round 1 September 6
1	Shanghai Dragons	3
3	New York Excelsior	1
2	Guangzhou Charge	0
4	Seoul Dynasty	3
Lower Round 1 September 12
2	Guangzhou Charge	0
3	New York Excelsior	3

Upper Final; September 12
1	Shanghai Dragons	3
4	Seoul Dynasty	2
Lower Final; September 13
4	Seoul Dynasty	3
3	New York Excelsior	0

Grand Finals bracket

Upper Round 1 October 8
A2	Seoul Dynasty	2
NA1	San Francisco Shock	3
NA2	Philadelphia Fusion	0
A1	Shanghai Dragons	3
Lower Round 1 October 9
A2	Seoul Dynasty	3
NA2	Philadelphia Fusion	0

Upper Final; October 9
NA1	San Francisco Shock	3
A1	Shanghai Dragons	2
Lower Final; October 9
A1	Shanghai Dragons	2
A2	Seoul Dynasty	3

Grand Finals; October 10
NA1	San Francisco Shock	4
A2	Seoul Dynasty	2

== Awards ==
=== Individual awards ===
Award	Recipient
Most Valuable Player (MVP)	Kim "Fleta" Byung-sun (Shanghai Dragons)
Dennis Hawelka Award	Caleb "McGravy" McGarvey (Los Angeles Valiant)
Rookie of the Year	Kim "Alarm" Kyeong-bo (Philadelphia Fusion)
Coach of the Year	Moon Byung-chul (Shanghai Dragons)
Grand Finals MVP	Kwon "Striker" Nam-joo (San Francisco Shock)

=== Role Stars ===
Damage	Tank	Support
Kim "Fleta" Byung-sun (Shanghai Dragons)	Lee "Fearless" Eui-seok (Shanghai Dragons)	Kim "Alarm" Kyeong-bo (Philadelphia Fusion)
Kim "Sp9rk1e" Yeong-han (Paris Eternal)	Kang "Void" Jun-woo (Shanghai Dragons)	Lee "Leejaegon" Jae-gon (Shanghai Dragons)
Lee "Carpe" Jae-hyeok (Philadelphia Fusion)	Choi "ChoiHyoBin" Hyo-bin (San Francisco Shock)	Min-Ki "Viol2t" Park (San Francisco Shock)
Lee "Ans" Seon-chang (San Francisco Shock)	Nam "Cr0ng" Gi-Cheol (Guangzhou Charge)	Brice "FDGod" Monsçavoir (Paris Eternal)
Lee "Lip" Jae-won (Shanghai Dragons)	–	–

== All-Star Games ==
The 2020 Overwatch League All-Star Games will be the Overwatch League's third edition of an all-star game that involves the All-Star players of the league. For the first time, the All-Stars will be split into two regions – Asia and North America. The Asia All-Star Game will be played on September 26, while the North America All-Star Game will be played on October 3. Both games will be the culmination of their respective All-Star Weekend, an event that consists of the Talent Takedown, a Widowmaker 1v1 tournament, as well as other various skills challenges.

== Winnings ==
Teams in the 2020 season competed for a total prize pool of US$4,775,000 across midseason tournaments and playoffs. By League rules, at least 50% of these winnings are split among the team's members, the remaining going to the team's owner.

Team	May Melee	Summer Showdown	Countdown Cup	Season playoffs	Total
Atlanta Reign	$5,000	–	$5,000	$75,000	$85,000
Boston Uprising	–	–	–	–	$0
Chengdu Hunters	–	–	$15,000	–	$15,000
Dallas Fuel	$5,000	–	$5,000	–	$10,000
Florida Mayhem	$30,000	–	$15,000	$75,000	$120,000
Guangzhou Charge	$5,000	$65,000	–	$75,000	$145,000
Hangzhou Spark	–	–	$35,000	–	$35,000
Houston Outlaws	–	$5,000	–	–	$5,000
London Spitfire	–	–	–	–	$0
Los Angeles Gladiators	$5,000	–	$5,000	$75,000	$85,000
Los Angeles Valiant	$10,000	–	$5,000	$75,000	$90,000
New York Excelsior	$10,000	$15,000	$15,000	$250,000	$290,000
Paris Eternal	$5,000	$70,000	$15,000	$75,000	$165,000
Philadelphia Fusion	$10,000	$35,000	$35,000	$350,000	$430,000
San Francisco Shock	$55,000	$15,000	$65,000	$1,500,000	$2,850,000
Seoul Dynasty	$30,000	$15,000	–	$750,000	$795,000
Shanghai Dragons	$55,000	$30,000	$60,000	$450,000	$595,000
Toronto Defiant	–	$20,000	–	–	$20,000
Vancouver Titans	–	–	–	–	$0
Washington Justice	–	$5,000	–	$250,000	$255,000
Total	$225,000	$275,000	$275,000	$4,000,000	$4,775,000
