= Shanghai Dragons (esports) =

Chinese professional esports team

Shanghai Dragons 上海龙之队
- Founded: 12 July 2017
- Disbanded: 2023
- League: Overwatch League
- Region: East
- Team history: Shanghai Dragons (2017–2023)
- Based in: Shanghai, China
- Colors
- Owner: NetEase
- Head coach: Moon Byung-chul
- General manager: Yang Van
- Affiliation: Team CC
- Championships: 2021
- Website: Official website

Uniforms

Chinese name
- Simplified Chinese: 上海龙之队
- Traditional Chinese: 上海龍之隊
Transcriptions
Standard Mandarin
- Hanyu Pinyin: Shànghǎi Lóngzhīduì

The Shanghai Dragons (Chinese: 上海龙之队; pinyin: Shànghǎi Lóngzhīduì) were a professional Overwatch esports team based in Shanghai, China. The Dragons competed in the Overwatch League (OWL) as a member of the league's East region. Founded in 2017, Shanghai Dragons were one of the league's twelve founding members and were one of four professional Overwatch teams based in China. The team was owned by Chinese internet technology company NetEase, who also owned Team CC, an academy team for the Dragons that competed in Overwatch Contenders.

The Shanghai Dragons did not win a single match in their first season in the OWL, going 0–40, giving them the record for the worst single-season record in professional sports history. The team also holds the record for the longest losing streak in professional sports history at 42 losses, passing the previous record 28-game losing streak held by the Philadelphia 76ers. Following, the Dragons overturned their roster, claimed at least one midseason tournament title in each of the next three seasons, and won the 2021 Overwatch League Grand Finals after shutting out Atlanta Reign.

== Franchise history ==
=== Beginnings ===
On July 12, 2017, Overwatch developer Activision Blizzard officially announced that NetEase, a Chinese technology company, would be the team owner of a Shanghai-based Overwatch League franchise. "We're passionate about gaming at NetEase, and the Overwatch League is an opportunity we didn't want to miss," said William Ding, CEO of NetEase. "The commitment of Overwatch's players and fan community is an incredible foundation on which to build a successful global league, and we're looking forward to building a world-class team for Shanghai that inspires fans everywhere." On September 27, NetEase revealed the franchise name as the Shanghai Dragons and was the first OWL team to release its branding.

On October 31, the Dragons revealed their Overwatch League roster, consisting of eight members. Three weeks later, on November 20, Shanghai Dragons announced their coaching staff, including head coach Chen "U4" Congshan.

=== 2018–2021: Winless to champions ===
Shanghai Dragons' first regular season OWL match was a 0–4 loss to the Los Angeles Gladiators. Unfortunately, this result would become a trend for the Dragons throughout the season. After an 0–10 start to the season, the Dragons signed four new players, including the Overwatch League's first female player, Kim "Geguri" Se-yeon. After four more losses, head coach U4 stepped down from his position, leaving assistant coach Son "Kong" Jun-young as the team's interim head coach. The team continued to lose; after their 29th consecutive loss, the Dragons surpassed the Philadelphia 76ers' record for the longest losing streak in professional sports history. After another loss, Dragons went through another coaching change, as head coach RUI stepped down due to health issues. Having not won a single match the entire season, the Dragons finished the season with a 0–40 record and a -120 map differential. This marked the worst single-season record in professional sports history.

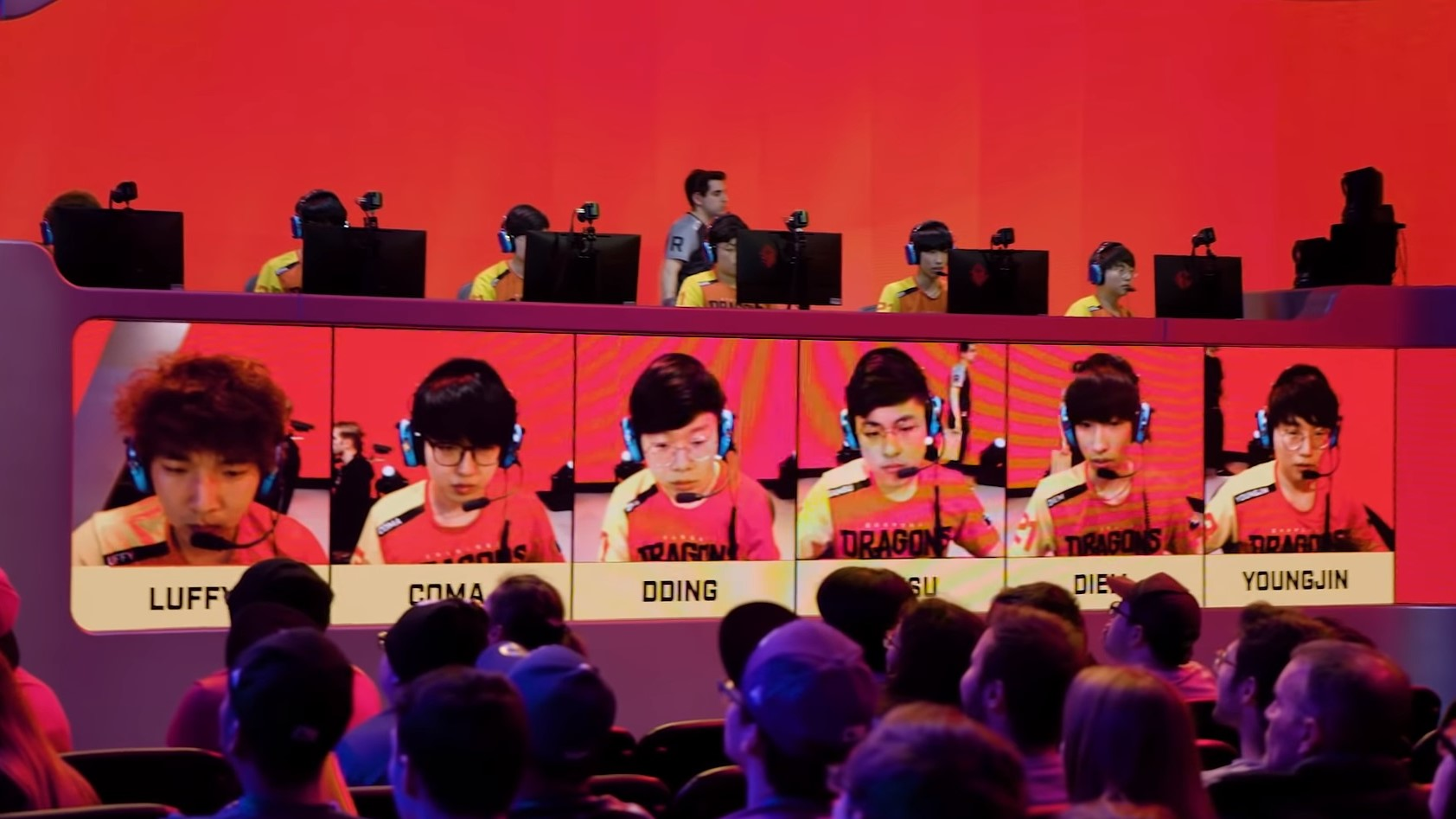
The Dragons won their first match in 2019.

In hopes of not reliving the 2018 season, the Shanghai Dragons released eight of 11 members of their roster in the offseason, leaving only Geguri, Lee "Fearless" Eui-seok, and Lu "Diya" Weida. Shortly after, they picked up We "BlueHaS" Seong-hwan as their new head coach. The team announced six new player signings in mid-October 2018. The team also acquired tank player Noh "Gamsu" Young-jin from the Boston Uprising late in the offseason, after Fearless became inactive due to unspecified health reasons. Shanghai opened the 2019 season with two consecutive losses. On February 23, 2019, Shanghai snapped their 42-game losing streak – the longest losing streak in professional sports history – by defeating the Boston Uprising, 3–1, marking the franchise's first ever win. The team picked up two more wins in Stage 1 for a respectable 3–4 record for the stage. The Dragons found more success in Stage 2, as they finished with a 4–3 record and qualified for their first ever stage playoffs, as well as became the first of two Chinese teams to qualify for a stage playoffs. Shanghai lost in their quarterfinals match against the San Francisco Shock, 1–3, but were able to snap the Shock's 28-map winning streak in the process. The Dragons hit their stride after the All-Star break, amassing a 5–2 Stage 3 record, and qualified for the Stage 3 playoffs. The team took down the top-seeded New York Excelsior, 3–1, and the second-seeded Vancouver Titans, 4–1, in the quarterfinals and semifinals, respectively, before defeating the third-seeded Shock, 4–3, in the finals to claim their first-ever stage championship. Prior to the start of Stage 4, the team acquired support player Kim "Izayaki" Min-chul from the Los Angeles Valiant. Shanghai's success did not last, however; after the implementation of a 2-2-2 role lock by the league in Stage 4, the Dragons only won one of their final seven matches, finishing the regular season in 11th place with a 13–15 record. The team advanced to the play-in tournament for a chance to qualify for the season playoffs. They won their first match against the Philadelphia Fusion, 4–2. Their second match, against the London Spitfire, went to an OWL record eight maps, but the Dragons fell 3–4, ending their playoff hopes.

Prior to the 2020 season, the Dragons dropped most of their coaching staff, including head coach BlueHas, and signed former Los Angeles Valiant head coach Byung-Chul "Moon" Moon as their new head coach. The team also released several players, including Gamsu and tank player Jin "Youngjin" Young-jin. Shanghai added six players to their roster, picking up damage players Kim "Fleta" Byung-sun and Lee "Lip" Jae-won, tank players Kang "Void" Jun-Woo and Seo "Stand1" Ji-won, and support player Lee "Leejaegon" Jae-gon, as well as promoting Fearless back to the main roster, after the team had sent him down to their Overwatch Contenders academy team Team CC. Behind the resurgence of Fearless at the tank position and rookie-of-the-year-level gameplay from Lip, the Dragons were widely considered the best team in the league throughout the league's first tournament cycle of the season, the May Melee. The team took down the Seoul Dynasty, 4–3, in the Asia region May Melee finals, after going down 0–3 to start the match. The Dragons reached the finals in the following two tournament cycles, the Summer Showdown and Countdown Cup; while they lost to the Guangzhou Charge in the Asia Summer Showdown finals, they took down the Hangzhou Spark in the Asia Countdown Cup finals to claim their second midseason tournament title of the year. The Dragons finished the regular season atop the Asia region standings with 27–2 record, including bonus wins. Shanghai took down the New York Excelsior and Seoul Dynasty in the Asia bracket of the season playoffs, advancing them to the Grand Finals bracket. In the Grand Finals bracket, the Dragons took down the Fusion in the first round on October 8. The team faced the Shock in the upper bracket finals, but they lost the match, 2–3. The loss dropped them to the lower bracket finals, where they were upset by the Dynasty, losing 2–3 and ending their season. Fleta won the league's regular season Most Valuable Player award, while coach Moon was named the Coach of the Year.

In the offseason preceding the 2021 season, the team elected not to re-sign all five of their free agents, which included Geguri. Additionally, the Dragons transferred Fearless to the Dallas Fuel; team found his replacement in tank player Koo "Fate" Pan-seung, who was acquired from the Florida Mayhem. The Dragons advanced to the May Melee tournament, the first of four midseason double-elimination tournaments in the regular season, as the second-seeded Eastern team. The Dragons reached the finals of the tournament, where lost to the Dallas Fuel. The team again advanced to the finals, where they faced the Fuel; this time, the Dragons defeated the Fuel, claiming their first title of the 2021 season. The Dragons went undefeated in the Summer Showdown tournament cycle, ultimately defeating the Chengdu Hunters in the finals to claim their second consecutive midseason tournament title. In the final tournament cycle of the regular season, the Countdown Cup, the Dragons went 2–2 in the qualifiers, failing to advance to the regional knockouts for the first time in the season; Dragons' head coach Moon stated that they were "resting" their players during the tournament cycle. The team finished the regular season with 12 wins, 4 losses, 20 league points, and the top seed in the season playoffs. Lip, Void, Izayaki, and Leejaegon were all awarded Role Star commendations on the season. Shanghai selected the sixth-seeded San Francisco Shock as their opponent for the first round of the season playoffs; the Dragons swept the Shock, 3–0. The team next defeated the fourth-seeded Los Angeles Gladiators by a score of 3–1. Moving on to the upper bracket finals, the Dragons faced the second-seeded Dallas Fuel, marking the fifth time the two teams had played each other in a midseason or season playoff match in the 2021 season. Despite keeping the maps close, the Dragons came out with a 3–1 victory to advance the Grand Finals. In the Grand Finals match, the Dragons swept the Reign by a score of 4–0 to win their first OWL championship.

=== 2022–2023 ===
In the 2022 season, the Dragons won the East Summer Showdown tournament, the third midseason tournament of the season. The Dragons secured a playoff berth, but ultimately fell to the eventual second-place San Francisco Shock in a 3-1 loss to be eliminated from the playoffs.

The Dragons re-tooled their roster for the 2023 season, losing superstar DPS Lip to the Atlanta Reign, their support line of Izayaki and Leejaegon to the Boston Uprising, and off-tank Void to the Seoul Dynasty. The Dragons signed a number of new players to replace them, including veterans in Gangnamjin, Diem, and Heesu, as well as the rising flex DPS talent Viper. Fleta remained on the roster, shifting to the tank position after a disappointing 2022 season on DPS.

== Team identity ==
On September 27, 2017, the Shanghai Dragons brand was officially unveiled. The name "dragons" was chosen as the dragon is a symbol of a sacred, powerful, and supreme spirit. The logo for the Shanghai Dragons features a stylized dragon in the shape of the letter 'S' in the team's official colors of red, yellow, white, and black. Specifically, red is a theme color for the logo, as it emphasizes the team's Chinese connection.

== Personnel ==
=== Head coaches ===
Handle	Name	Seasons	Record	Notes	Ref.
U4	Chen Congshan	2018	0–14 (.000)	Released after 14 games in 2018	
Kong	Son Jun-young	2018	0–6 (.000)	Interim head coach.	
RUI	Wang Xingrui	2018	0–10 (.000)	Released after 10 games in 2018	
Kong	Son Jun-young	2018	0–10 (.000)	Interim head coach.	
BlueHaS	We Seong-hwan	2019	13–15 (.464)		
Moon	Moon Byung-chul	2020–2023	49–12 (.803)		

== Awards and records ==
=== Seasons overview ===
Season	P	W	L	W%	Finish	Playoffs
2018	40	0	40	.000	6th, Pacific	Did not qualify
2019	28	13	15	.464	7th, Pacific	Did not qualify
2020	21	19	2	.905	1st, Asia	Lost in GF Lower Round 2, 2–3 (Dynasty)
2021	16	12	4	.750	1st, East	OWL Champions, 4–0 (Reign)
2022	24	18	6	.750	2nd, East	Lost in Lower Round 1, 1–3 (Shock)
2023	17	5	12	.294	11th, East	Did not qualify

=== Individual accomplishments ===
Season MVP

- Fleta (Kim Byung-sun) – 2020

Grand Finals MVP

- LIP (Lee Jae-won) – 2021

Role Stars selections

- DDing (Yang Jin-hyeok) – 2019
- Fleta (Kim Byung-sun) – 2020
- LIP (Lee Jae-won) – 2020, 2021
- Fearless (Lee Eui-seok) – 2020
- Void (Kang Jun-woo) – 2020, 2021
- LeeJaeGon (Lee Jae-gon) – 2020, 2021
- Izayaki (Kim Min-chul) – 2021

All-Star Game selections

- Geguri (Kim Se-yeon) – 2018
- Diem (Bae Min-sung) – 2019
- Fearless (Lee Eui-seok) – 2020
- Void (Kang Jun-woo) – 2020
- Fleta (Kim Byung-sun) – 2020
- LeeJaeGon (Lee Jae-gon) – 2020
- Izayaki (Kim Min-chul) – 2020

All-Star Game head coaches

- Moon (Moon Byung-chul) – 2020

== Academy team ==
On January 10, 2018, the Dragons revealed "Team CC", their academy team for Overwatch Contenders China. In Season One, the team reached the playoff semi-finals before losing to eventual runners-up LGD Gaming 1–3.
