= Seoul Dynasty =

2017–2024 South Korean esports team

- Founded: July 12, 2017
- League: Overwatch League
- Region: East
- Team history: Seoul Dynasty (2017–2023)
- Based in: Seoul, South Korea
- Colors
- Owner: Kevin Chou
- Head coach: Yang "tobi" Jin-mo
- Main sponsor: Bithumb
- Website: Official website

Uniforms

Seoul Dynasty was a South Korean professional Overwatch esports team based in Seoul, South Korea. The Dynasty compete in the Overwatch League (OWL) as a member of the league's East region. Founded in 2017, Seoul Dynasty is one of the league's twelve founding members and one of two professional Overwatch teams based in South Korea. The team is owned by Kevin Chou of Generation Gaming, who also own and operate an academy team for the Dynasty that compete in Overwatch Contenders (OWC) under the moniker Gen.G Esports.

The team that would be the Seoul Dynasty competed under the moniker Lunatic-Hai and were considered to be one the best Overwatch teams heading into the OWL's inaugural season. However, the team failed to reach the playoffs in 2018. Seoul qualified for the playoffs for the first time in 2019, and in 2020, the team reached the Grand Finals, where they lost to the San Francisco Shock. In 2023, the team was disbanded.

== Franchise history ==
=== Team creation ===
On July 12, 2017, Blizzard officially announced KSV Esports International, an esports organization created by Kevin Chou and Kent Wakeford who previously ran Kabam together, would be the team owner of a Seoul-based Overwatch League franchise. On August 21, the team announced the acquisition of the players and coaching staff of Korean Overwatch esports team Lunatic-Hai. In September, the team signed an additional coach in veteran Kim "nuGget" Yo-han. In late October, they revealed 3 additional players to their Seoul-based roster, Kim "Fleta" Byung-sun, Byeon "Munchkin" Sang-beom, and Koo "xepheR" Jae-mo. Shortly afterwards, on October 26, 2017, the franchise name was revealed as the Seoul Dynasty. A day later, the addition of Choi "Wekeed" Seok-woo was broadcast in the Dynasty's roster preview video. The final two members for the inaugural season, Chae "Bunny" Jun-hyeok and Kim "KuKi" Dae-kuk, were revealed by Blizzard in November.

=== 2018–2021: Early years ===
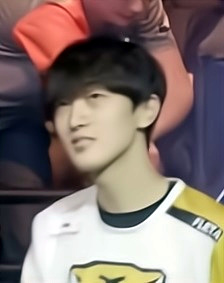
Fleta was with the Dynasty through the 2019 season.

Heading into the preseason of their 2018 season, the Dynasty were widely regarded as the team to beat. In the league's preseason the team further cemented their status as early favorites to win the inaugural season, after convincingly scoring victories over the Dragons, Outlaws, and Excelsior. The Dynasty began the first stage of the 2018 regular season well, winning their first five games. However, after key losses to the New York Excelsior, London Spitfire, and Los Angeles Valiant they fell out of playoff contention and finished the stage in fifth place, sparking discussions about a disappointing start to the season for a team favored to win it. They went on to finish fourth in the second stage as well, once again missing the stage playoffs. After the stage playoffs were expanded to include the team in fourth place, the Dynasty were predicted to be able to clinch a playoff spot thanks to their consistent fourth-place finishes in the prior stages, though their inability to defeat the top placing teams in the league brought up concerns over team management. With a rocky start to the third stage, coverage for the Dynasty shifted towards continued failure, with an article by ESPN's Emily Rand stating "Seoul's dynasty is already starting to crumble." They once again failed to reach the playoffs in both the third and fourth stages of the regular season, going 5–5 in Stage 3 and 3–7 in Stage 4. Falling further behind the top teams in map score. After finishing all four stages with worsening map scores, starting the first stage with a map differential of +9 and ending the last stage with a map differential of -6, the Dynasty fell out of season playoffs contention and finished the season in eighth place overall with a record of 22–18, a far cry from the expected and predicted success.

Prior to their 2019 season, the Dynasty announced Kim "KDG" Dong-gun as the team's new head coach. A 3–0 victory over the London Spitfire in the final match of Stage 1 gave the team a 4–3 record and qualified them Stage 1 Playoffs. Seoul took down the New York Excelsior 3–1 in the quarterfinals, but they were eliminated after losing to the Vancouver Titans, 0–4, in the semifinals. The Dynasty struggled in Stage 2, as they were only able to amass a 3–4 record. After the All-Star break, Seoul hit their stride. The team opened Stage 3 with three straight 4–0 sweeps over their opponents, leading to a 5–2 Stage 3 record. Qualified as the fifth seed in the Stage 3 Playoffs, the team fell to the San Francisco Shock, 1–3, in the quarterfinals. The Dynasty finished the regular season in eighth place, with a 15–13 record. After defeating the Guangzhou Charge, 3–1, in the play-in tournament, the Dynasty claimed the final spot in the season playoffs. Their playoff run opened with a 2–4 loss to the Vancouver Titans on September 5, sending the Dynasty to the lower bracket of the tournament. Seoul's season ended in the first round of the lower bracket, after they lost against the Hangzhou Spark, 1–4.

In the offseason preceding the 2020 season, the Dynasty released head coach KDG, with assistant coach Park "Changgoon" Chang-geun taking over as the team's head coach. The team made major roster changes, such as the departures of Kim "Fleta" Byung-sun and Ryu "Ryujehong" Je-hong and acquisitions of Park "Profit" Joon-yeong and Hong "Gesture" Jae-hui. In the first tournament cycle of the season, the May Melee, the Dynasty finished in last place in the Asia region qualifiers. However, the team turned things around in the knockouts, advancing the Asia region finals, where they faced the Shanghai Dragons. The Dynasty won the first three maps of the series; however, they lost the following four, losing the finals match 3–4. The team found middling results throughout the rest of the regular season, finishing with a 12–12 record, which included bonus wins from knockout matches. Seoul defeated the Hangzhou Spark on September 5 in the Asia region play-in tournament to advance to the Asia region bracket of the season playoffs. In the Asia bracket, a double-elimination tournament, the Dynasty defeated the Guangzhou Charge in the first round but lost to the Shanghai Dragons in the following round. The team defeated the New York Excelsior in the lower bracket finals, advancing them to the Grand Finals bracket. The Dynasty's first match in the Grand Finals bracket, a four-team double elimination tournament, was against the San Francisco Shock on October 8; Seoul lost the match 2–3, dropping to the lower bracket. The team defeated the Philadelphia Fusion, 3–0, in the first round of the lower bracket. In the lower finals, they upset the Shanghai Dragons, 3–2, to advance to the Grand Finals match against the Shock. The Dynasty fell short of an OWL title, however, losing the Grand Finals match, 2–4, on October 10.

The Dynasty parted ways with several players after the 2020 season, including support player Yang "tobi" Jin-mo, who was the last remaining member from Seoul's inaugural season team. The team picked up two veterans in former New York Excelsior players Jeong "ANAMO" Tae-seong and Park "Saebyeolbe" Jong-ryeol. However, Saebeyeolbe did not play the entire season, after Chinese teams boycotted him due to statements he made about Taiwan prior to the team's first game. In the 2021 season, the Dynasty was the only Eastern team to advance past the qualifying rounds in all four midseason tournament cycles; however, they were only able to advance past the regional knockouts once, in the Countdown Cup. The Dynasty finished the regular season in third place in the Eastern region standings with a 12–4 record. As the third seed, Seoul advanced to the Eastern play-in tournament, for a chance to make it to the season playoffs. However, on September 5, they lost their play-in match to the Fusion, 1–3, ending their season.

=== 2022–2023 ===
The Dynasty parted ways with five of their players, including Saebyeolbe and Gesture, as well as head coach Changgoon following the 2021 season; shortly after, the team brought in former player Yang "tobi" Jin-mo as their new head coach. Seoul also signed several new players to their team, including former Shock tank player Yoo "smurf" Myeong-hwan and former Excelsior support player Bang "JJonak" Sung-hyeon, although JJonak left the team for health reasons prior to the start of the 2022 season. The Dynasty won the Eastern region Kickoff Clash, the first tournament of the season, after they defeated the Philadelphia Fusion in the finals by a score of 4–0.

On November 21, 2023, Seoul Dynasty was disbanded.

== Team identity ==
On October 26, 2017, the organization's branding was unveiled.

After comprehensive feedback from the team's fans, staff, and players, the name "Dynasty" was chosen. The name was selected for its universal appeal, its representation of the team's aspirations of continual long-term success, and to pay homage to the Lunatic-Hai core of its inaugural season roster who had won back-to-back championships in OGN's Overwatch APEX.

Designed as a modernized royal seal, the logo for the Seoul Dynasty features a tiger in the team's colors, with the tiger's forehead featuring a stylized version of the Korean Hanja character for king (王 wang). The tiger was selected due to its symbolism in Korean culture where it represents "strength, courage, and good fortune".

The official team colors are black, gold, and white. Gold was chosen for its historical association with royal dynasties, whilst Black was chosen to convey power and elegance.

== Personnel ==
=== Current roster ===
Seoul Dynasty roster
Players	Coaches
Role / No. / Handle / Name / Nationality	Head coach: Vacant
Legend: (I) Inactive; (S) Suspended; (2W) Two-way player; Substitute; (injured) Injury / Illness	Latest roster transaction: October 16, 2023.

=== Head coaches ===
Handle	Name	Seasons	Record	Notes	Ref.
beast	Baek Kwang-jin	2018	22–18 (.550)		
KDG	Kim Dong-gun	2019	15–13 (.519)		
Changgoon	Park Chang-geun	2020–2021	21–16 (.568)		
tobi	Yang Jin-mo	2021–2023	19–5 (.792)		

== Awards and records ==
=== Seasons overview ===
Season	P	W	L	W%	Finish	Playoffs
2018	40	22	18	.550	3rd, Pacific	Did not qualify
2019	28	15	13	.536	5th, Pacific	Lost in Lower Round 1, 1–4 (Spark)
2020	21	9	12	.429	7th, Asia	Lost in Grand Finals, 2–4 (Shock)
2021	16	12	4	.750	3rd, East	Did not qualify
2022	24	19	5	.792	1st, East	Lost in Lower Round 3, 0–3 (Shock)

=== Individual accomplishments ===
All-Star Game selections

- Zunba (Kim Joon-hyeok) – 2018
- Fleta (Kim Byung-sun) – 2018, 2019
- ryujehong (Ryu Je-hong) – 2018, 2019
- Profit (Park Joon-yeong) – 2020
- Tobi (Yang Jin-mo) – 2020

== Academy team ==
Seoul Dynasty's official Overwatch Contenders academy team plays under the name of their parent company, Gen.G esports. The team revealed their Korean Contenders roster on November 4, 2018.
