= 2018 Dallas Fuel season =

- Head coach: Kyle "KyKy" Souder (Released April 16); Aaron "Aero" Atkins
- Owner: Mike Rufail; Kenneth Hersh
- Division: Pacific

Results
- Record: 12–28 (.300)
- Place: Pacific: 5th; League: 10th
- Stage 1 Playoffs: Did not qualify
- Stage 2 Playoffs: Did not qualify
- Stage 3 Playoffs: Did not qualify
- Stage 4 Playoffs: Semifinals
- Season Playoffs: Did not qualify
- Total Earnings: $50,000

The 2018 Dallas Fuel season was the first season of the Dallas Fuel's existence in the Overwatch League (OWL). After Envy Gaming acquired the Dallas franchise slot for the OWL on October 5, 2017, the roster and staff of Team EnVyUs was transferred to the Dallas Fuel. The Fuel struggled throughout the first three quarters of the season, winning only six games, largely due to the instability of their roster. The team also went through a head coaching change, releasing Kyle "KyKy" Souder and signing Aaron "Aero" Atkins. Dallas had their most successful stage in Stage 4 and qualified for the Stage 4 playoffs. However, they lost in the semifinals to the New York Excelsior. The team finished with a regular season record of 12–28 placing them tenth overall and did not qualify for the season playoffs.

== Preceding offseason ==
On September 20, 2017, Blizzard officially announced that Envy Gaming had acquired the Dallas-based Overwatch League franchise spot. All of the existing members of Team EnVyUs were transferred to the new team, the Dallas Fuel, which consisted of:

- Timo "Taimou" Kettunen
- Jonathan "HarryHook" Tejedor Rua
- Sebastian "Chipshajen" Widlund
- Christian "cocco" Jonsson
- Hyeon "EFFECT" Hwang
- Pongphop "Mickie" Rattanasangchod

The team announced the signing of popular player and streamer Brandon "Seagull" Larned three days later. Dallas rounded out their roster in late October, signing support player Scott "Custa" Kennedy on October 27 and tank player Félix "xQc" Lengyel on October 28.

== Regular season ==
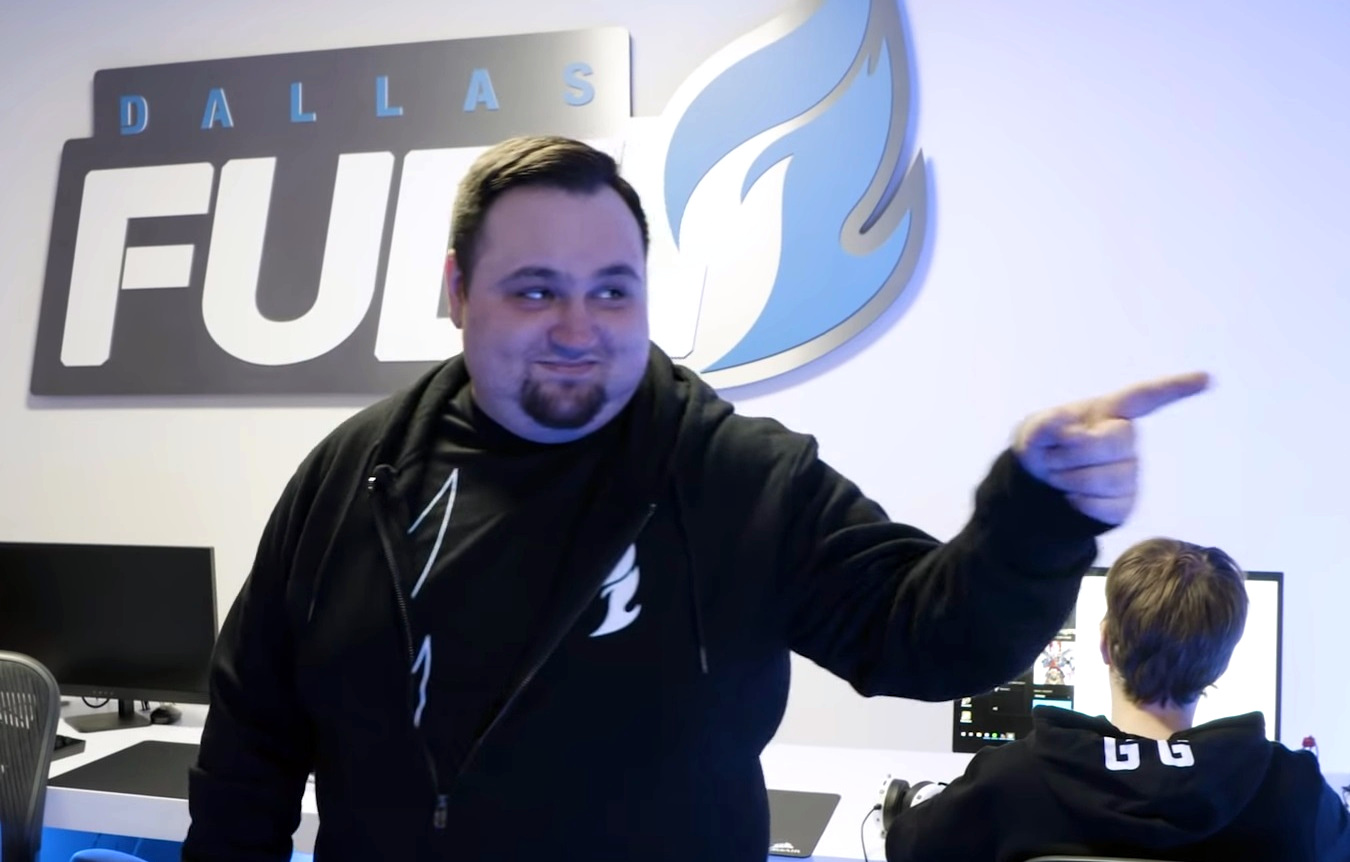
Aaron "Aero" Atkins took over as head coach in 2018 Stage 4.

Fuel's first-ever OWL regular season match was on January 10, 2018, and resulted in a 1–2 loss to the Seoul Dynasty. The first three quarters of the Fuel's season was plagued with player discipline issues and an inconsistent roster. On January 19, the Overwatch League suspended xQc for four games after he made anti-gay remarks towards a Houston Outlaws player the day before. The Fuel extended the suspension to the entirety of Stage 1 shortly after. Between Stages 1 and 2, the Fuel acquired damage players Dylan "aKm" Bignet and Kim "Rascal" Dong-jun from free agency and the London Spitfire, respectively. On March 8, in the middle of Stage 2, the Fuel signed tank player Son "OGE" Min-seok, maxing out their roster at 12 players. Two days later, xQc was suspended for another four matches, after he "used an emote in a racially disparaging manner on the league’s stream and on social media, and used disparaging language against Overwatch League casters and fellow players on social media and on his personal stream." The following day, on March 11, the Fuel released xQc. The Fuel's player discipline issues continued later on in the stage, as OGE received a four-game suspension on March 23 for account boosting, a process in which a player is paid to increase another player's skill rating, back in Summer 2017. On April 2, prior to the start of Stage 3, Dallas traded Custa to the Los Angeles Valiant in exchange for support player Benjamin "uNKOE" Chevasson. On April 15, the Fuel released head coach Kyle "KyKy" Souder and assistant coach Emanuel "Peak" Uzoni was named the interim head coach. Additionally, Rascal was released due to commitment issues and his unwillingness to communicate. Along with periodical absences, including missing most of Stage 3, during the season from Hwang "EFFECT" Hyeon, the Fuel amassed 24 losses in the first three stages; the six matches they won included three over the winless Shanghai Dragons.

On May 15, a day before the start of Stage 4, Dallas announced the signing of former Fusion University head coach Aaron "Aero" Atkins as their new head coach. The stage also saw the support hero Brigitte become a strong character to play; Fuel's Pongphop "Mickie" Rattanasangchod performed particularly well with the hero throughout the stage. The Fuel doubled their number of wins Stage 4, going 6–4, which included victories over top teams such as the Valiant, Uprising, Spitfire, and Fusion. The record would be good enough to claim the fourth seed in the Stage 4 playoffs. In the stage semifinals on June 16, the team lost to the New York Excelsior, 2–3. Dallas ended the season 10th place with a record of 12–28.

On August 23, Mickie, OGE, and Seagull were announced to represent the Fuel in the 2018 All-Star Game; however, Seagull announced his retirement before the game and was subsequently replaced by Los Angeles Gladiators tank player Bischu.

== Final roster ==
2018 Dallas Fuel roster
Players
Coaches

Role	No.	Handle	Name	Nationality
Damage	10	aKm	Bignet, Dylan	France
Damage	13	Taimou	Kettunen, Timo	Finland
Damage	39	EFFECT	Hwang Hyeon	South Korea
Tank	2	OGE	Son Min-seok	South Korea
Tank	55	cocco	Jonsson, Christian	Sweden
Support	4	Chipshajen	Widlund, Sebastian	Sweden
Support	9	HarryHook	Tejedor, Jonathan	Spain
Support	24	Unkoe	Chevasson, Benjamin	France
Flex	7	Mickie	Rattanasangchod, Pongphop	Thailand
Flex	7	Seagull	Larned, Brandon	United States

Head coach

- Aaron Atkins

Legend:
- (I) Inactive
- (S) Suspended
- (2W) Two-way player
- Substitute
- (injured) Injury / Illness

Latest roster transaction: April 16, 2018.

=== Transactions ===
Transactions of/for players on the roster during the 2018 regular season:

- On February 13, Fuel signed Dylan "aKm" Bignet.
- On February 13, Fuel acquired Kim "Rascal" Dong-jun from London Spitfire.
- On March 8, Fuel signed Son "OGE" Min-seok.
- On March 11, Fuel released Félix "xQc" Lengyel.
- On April 2, Fuel traded Scott "Custa" Kennedy to Los Angeles Valiant in exchange for Benjamin "Unkoe" Chevasson.
- On April 15, Fuel released Kim "Rascal" Dong-jun.

== Standings ==
=== Record by stage ===
Stage	Pld	W	L	Pct	MW	ML	MT	MD	Pos
1	10	3	7	.300	14	25	3	-11	10
2	10	2	8	.200	13	28	1	-15	11
3	10	1	9	.100	9	30	2	-21	11
4	10	6	4	.600	22	17	1	+5	4
Overall	40	12	28	.300	58	100	7	-42	10
Qualified for playoffs

=== League ===
Pos	Div	Team	Pld	W	L	PCT	MW	ML	MT	MD	Qualification
1	ATL	New York Excelsior	40	34	6	0.850	126	43	4	+83	Advance to season playoffs semifinals
2	PAC	Los Angeles Valiant	40	27	13	0.675	100	64	7	+36	Advance to season playoffs semifinals
3	ATL	Boston Uprising	40	26	14	0.650	99	71	3	+28	Advance to season playoffs quarterfinals
4	PAC	Los Angeles Gladiators	40	25	15	0.625	96	72	3	+24	Advance to season playoffs quarterfinals
5	ATL	London Spitfire	40	24	16	0.600	102	69	3	+33	Advance to season playoffs quarterfinals
6	ATL	Philadelphia Fusion	40	24	16	0.600	93	80	2	+13	Advance to season playoffs quarterfinals
7	ATL	Houston Outlaws	40	22	18	0.550	94	77	2	+17	
8	PAC	Seoul Dynasty	40	22	18	0.550	91	78	3	+13	
9	PAC	San Francisco Shock	40	17	23	0.425	77	84	5	−7	
10	PAC	Dallas Fuel	40	12	28	0.300	58	100	7	−42	
11	ATL	Florida Mayhem	40	7	33	0.175	42	120	5	−78	
12	PAC	Shanghai Dragons	40	0	40	0.000	21	141	2	−120	

Source: The Overwatch League
Rules for classification: 1) winning percentage; 2) map differential; 3) head-to-head map differential; 4) head-to-head record

== Game log ==
=== Preseason ===
2018 preseason game log
Preseason (2–0)

1	December 7	Dallas Fuel	3	–	2	Houston Outlaws	Burbank, CA

2	December 9	Florida Mayhem	1	–	3	Dallas Fuel	Burbank, CA

=== Regular season ===
2018 game log (Regular season record: 12–28)
Stage 1 (3–7)

1	January 10	Dallas Fuel	1	–	2	Seoul Dynasty	Burbank, CA

2	January 12	Los Angeles Valiant	3	–	0	Dallas Fuel	Burbank, CA

3	January 18	Dallas Fuel	0	–	4	Houston Outlaws	Burbank, CA

4	January 19	London Spitfire	3	–	1	Dallas Fuel	Burbank, CA

5	January 26	Dallas Fuel	3	–	0	San Francisco Shock	Burbank, CA

6	January 27	Dallas Fuel	2	–	3	Boston Uprising	Burbank, CA

7	February 01	Philadelphia Fusion	4	–	0	Dallas Fuel	Burbank, CA

8	February 03	Dallas Fuel	1	–	3	New York Excelsior	Burbank, CA

9	February 07	Shanghai Dragons	2	–	3	Dallas Fuel	Burbank, CA

10	February 09	Los Angeles Gladiators	1	–	3	Dallas Fuel	Burbank, CA

Stage 2 (2–8)

11	February 21	Dallas Fuel	3	–	1	Shanghai Dragons	Burbank, CA

12	February 23	Dallas Fuel	3	–	1	Los Angeles Gladiators	Burbank, CA

13	February 28	Seoul Dynasty	3	–	1	Dallas Fuel	Burbank, CA

14	March 02	Dallas Fuel	1	–	3	Los Angeles Valiant	Burbank, CA

15	March 07	San Francisco Shock	3	–	0	Dallas Fuel	Burbank, CA

16	March 10	Florida Mayhem	3	–	2	Dallas Fuel	Burbank, CA

17	March 14	Boston Uprising	4	–	0	Dallas Fuel	Burbank, CA

18	March 17	Dallas Fuel	0	–	4	Philadelphia Fusion	Burbank, CA

19	March 22	New York Excelsior	3	–	2	Dallas Fuel	Burbank, CA

20	March 24	Dallas Fuel	1	–	3	London Spitfire	Burbank, CA

Stage 3 (1–9)

21	April 04	Shanghai Dragons	1	–	3	Dallas Fuel	Burbank, CA

22	April 06	Los Angeles Gladiators	3	–	1	Dallas Fuel	Burbank, CA

23	April 11	Dallas Fuel	2	–	3	Seoul Dynasty	Burbank, CA

24	April 13	Los Angeles Valiant	2	–	1	Dallas Fuel	Burbank, CA

25	April 18	Dallas Fuel	0	–	4	San Francisco Shock	Burbank, CA

26	April 21	Houston Outlaws	3	–	0	Dallas Fuel	Burbank, CA

27	April 25	Dallas Fuel	1	–	3	Florida Mayhem	Burbank, CA

28	April 27	Dallas Fuel	0	–	4	Boston Uprising	Burbank, CA

29	May 02	Philadelphia Fusion	3	–	1	Dallas Fuel	Burbank, CA

30	May 03	Dallas Fuel	0	–	4	New York Excelsior	Burbank, CA

Stage 4 (6–4)

31	May 16	Dallas Fuel	3	–	1	Shanghai Dragons	Burbank, CA

32	May 18	Dallas Fuel	0	–	4	Los Angeles Gladiators	Burbank, CA

33	May 23	Boston Uprising	0	–	3	Dallas Fuel	Burbank, CA

34	May 26	Dallas Fuel	3	–	1	Philadelphia Fusion	Burbank, CA

35	May 31	San Francisco Shock	3	–	1	Dallas Fuel	Burbank, CA

36	June 02	London Spitfire	1	–	3	Dallas Fuel	Burbank, CA

37	June 06	Dallas Fuel	1	–	3	Houston Outlaws	Burbank, CA

38	June 08	Florida Mayhem	0	–	4	Dallas Fuel	Burbank, CA

39	June 13	Seoul Dynasty	3	–	1	Dallas Fuel	Burbank, CA

40	June 15	Dallas Fuel	3	–	1	Los Angeles Valiant	Burbank, CA

Semifinals	June 16	Dallas Fuel	2	–	3	New York Excelsior	Burbank, CA
