= List of Dallas Fuel players =

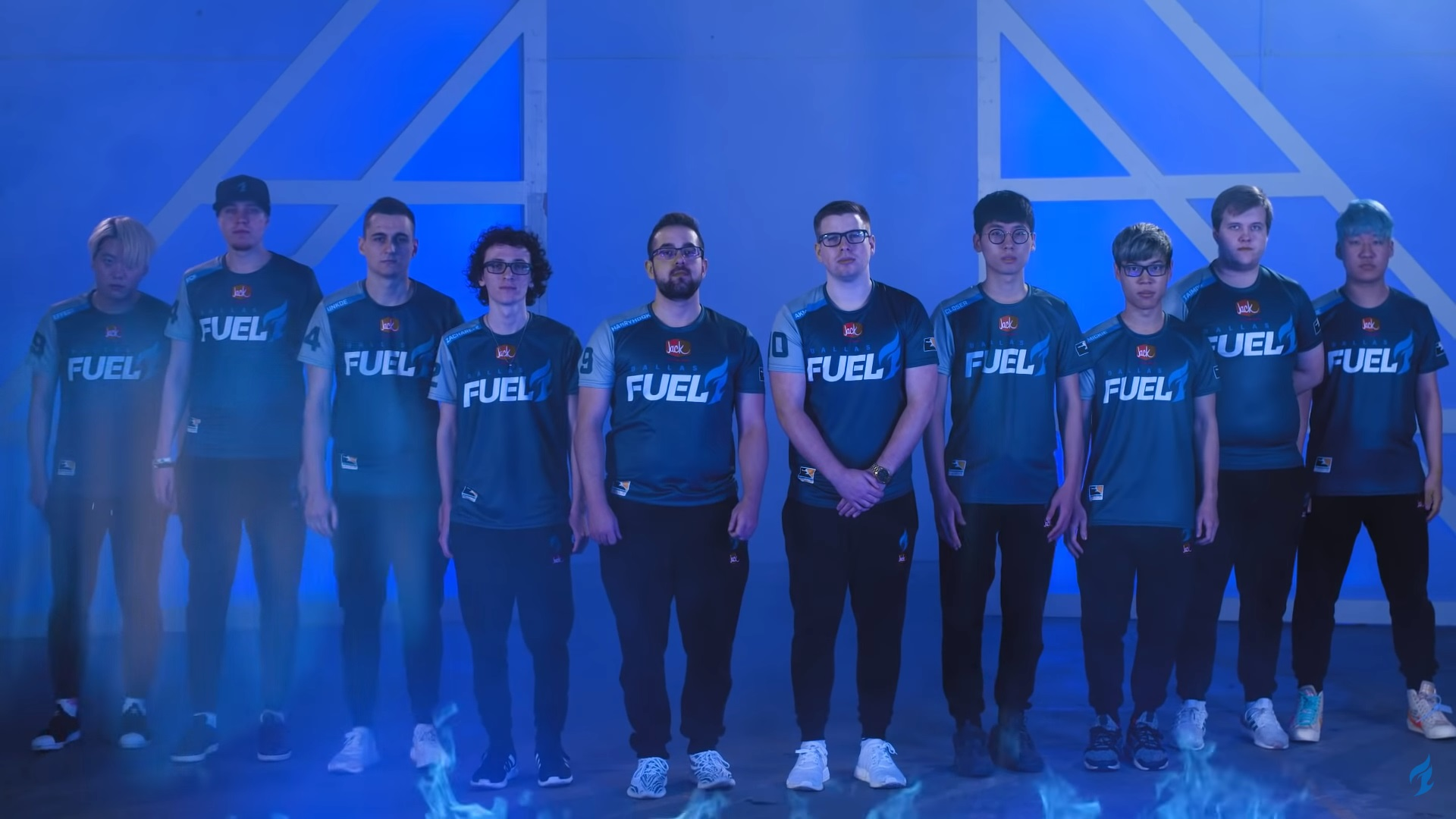
Dallas Fuel players introduced prior to the 2019 season.

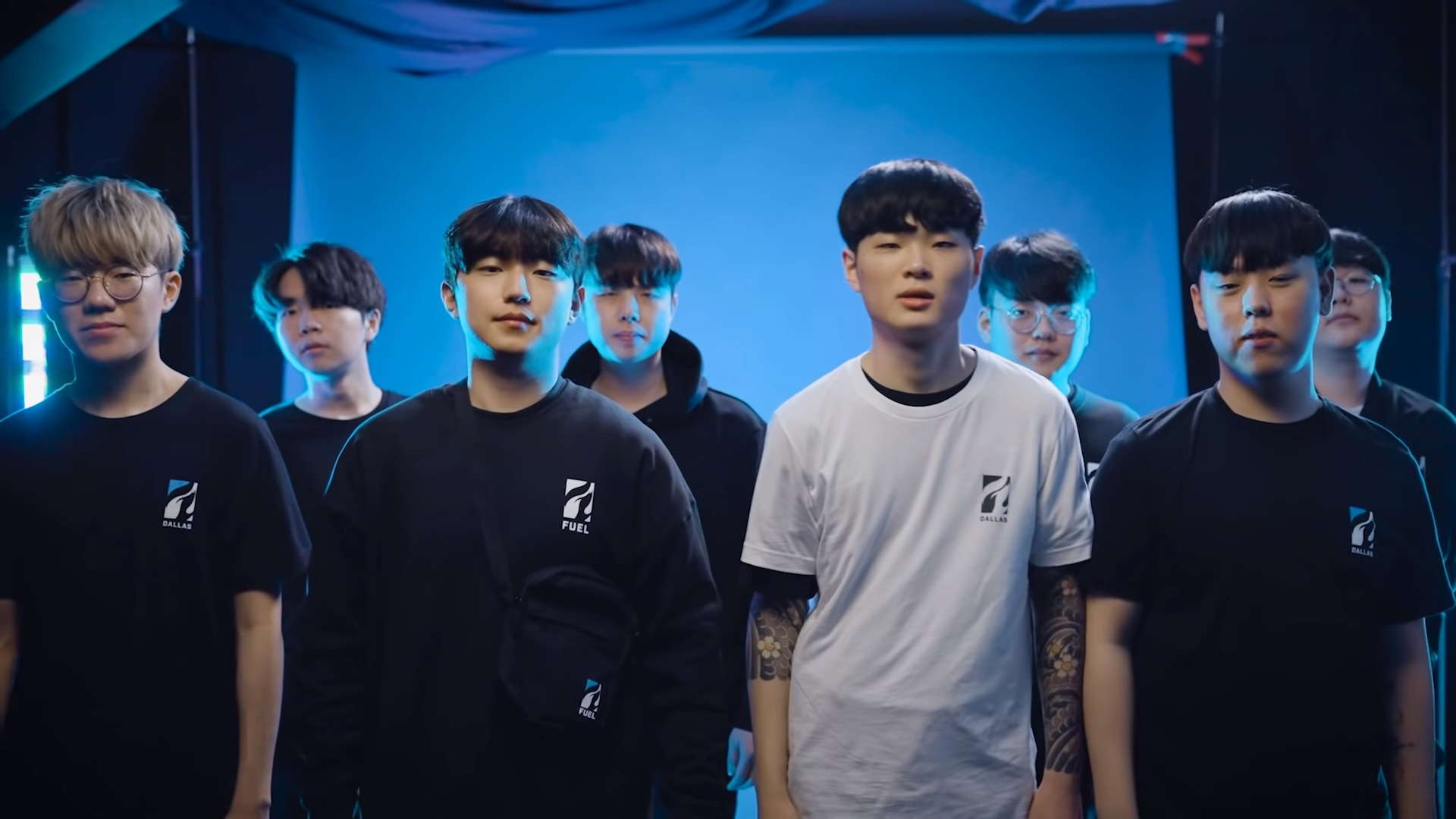
Dallas Fuel players introduced prior to the 2021 season.

Dallas Fuel is an American esports team founded in 2017 that competes in the Overwatch League (OWL). The Fuel began playing competitive Overwatch in the 2018 season.

All rostered players during the OWL season (including the playoffs) are included, even if they did not make an appearance.

== All-time roster ==
As of December 14, 2021

Handle	Name	Role	Country	Seasons	Ref.
aKm	Dylan Bignet	Damage	France	2018–2020	
chipshajen	Sebastian Widlund	Support	Sweden	2018	
ChiYo	Hyeonseok Han	Support	South Korea	2022–present	
Closer	Wonsik Jung	Support	South Korea	2019–2020	
cocco	Christian Jonsson	Tank	Sweden	2018	
Crimzo	William Hernandez	Support	Canada	2020	
Custa	Scott Kennedy	Support	Australia	2018	
Decay	Guiun Jang	Damage	South Korea	2020	
Doha	Dongha Kim	Damage	South Korea	2020–present	
Edison	Taehoon Kim	Damage	South Korea	2022–present	
EFFECT	Hyeon Hwang	Damage	South Korea	2018–2019	
Fearless	Euiseok Lee	Tank	South Korea	2021–present	
Fielder	Jun Kwon	Support	South Korea	2021–present	
Gamsu	Noh Yeong-Jin	Tank	South Korea	2020	
guriyo	Minseo Kang	Damage	South Korea	2022–present	
HarryHook	Jonathan Tejedor Rua	Support	Spain	2018–2020	
Hanbin	Hanbin Choi	Tank	South Korea	2021–present	
Jecse	Seungsoo Lee	Support	South Korea	2021	
Mickie	Pongphop Rattanasangchod	Tank	Thailand	2018–2019	
NotE	Lucas Meissner	Tank	Canada	2019–2020	
OGE	Minseok Son	Tank	South Korea	2018–2019	
ONIGOD	Stefan Fiskerstrand	Damage	Norway	2020	
Paintbrush	Nolan Edwards	Support	United States	2020	
Pine	Kim Do-hyeon	Damage	South Korea	2021	
Rapel	Junggeun Kim	Support	South Korea	2021	
Rascal	Dongjun Kim	Damage	South Korea	2018	
rCk	Richard Kanerva	Tank	Finland	2019	
Seagull	Brandon Larned	Flex	United States	2018	
SP9RK1E	Yeonghan Kim	Damage	South Korea	2021–present	
Taimou	Timo Kettunen	Damage	Finland	2018–2019	
Trill	Ashley Powell	Tank	Australia	2019–2020	
uNKOE	Benjamin Chevasson	Support	France	2018–2020	
xQc	Félix Lengyel	Tank	Canada	2018	
Xzi	Kihyo Jung	Damage	South Korea	2020-2021	
ZachaREEE	Zachary Lombardo	Damage	United States	2019–2020	
