= LinGan e-Sports =

Chinese Overwatch team

- Divisions: Overwatch; League of Legends; PUBG: Battlegrounds
- Founded: 2016
- Based in: Nanchang, China
- Colors: Brown, black, white
- Owner: Cao Hanlin
- Affiliation: LinGan e-Sports Institute
- Website: www.lingane-sport.com

LinGan e-Sports, or simply LGE, is a Chinese esports organization founded in August 2016 in Shenzhen, Guangdong Province. Based in Nanchang, China, it has fielded teams for video games such as Overwatch, League of Legends, and PUBG: Battlegrounds. In 2019, LGE partnered with the Chengdu Hunters of the Overwatch League (OWL) to play as an academy team in 2019 as LGE.Huya.

== Overwatch ==
LGE competed in the first season of Overwatch Contenders China, which occurred in 2018. The team made it to the playoffs in Season 1, but fell to LGD Gaming in the quarterfinals. In Season 2, LGE, again, made it to the playoffs, only to get defeated in the quarterfinals by LGD. Season 3 ended in the same manner, as LGE made it to the playoffs and lost in the quarterfinals to LGD for the third straight season.

On January 27, LinGan e-Sports Club announced their partnership with the Chengdu Hunters and became their academy team, where they changed the name of their Overwatch team to LGE.Huya.

In 2019 Season 1, LGE.Huya went a perfect 5–0 group stages, with only a single map loss, and qualified for the playoffs for the fourth straight season. In the playoffs, LGE defeated Triple Six Legend in the quarterfinals, defeated Hangzhou Spark's academy team Bilibili Gaming in the semifinals, and swept The One Winner in the Grand Finals by a score of 4–0 to claim the Overwatch Contenders China title. Due to their performance in Season 1, the team qualified for the 2019 Pacific Showdown – a double-elimination interregional tournament – with a first-round bye. After losing to O2 Blast in Round 1 of the winners' bracket, the team was eliminated by Talon Esports to place 5th in the tournament. In 2019 Season 2, LGE finished second in their group to qualify for the regional playoffs, where they took down the Shanghai Dragons' academy Team CC in the finals to claim their second consecutive Contenders title. Due to their regional title, the team qualified for The Gauntlet, an interregional, Contenders tournament, as the sole representative from the China region; however, they were eliminated in the group stages after getting swept by both Gen.G and Gladiators Legion.
