= InternetHulk =

German professional Overwatch player (1987–2017)

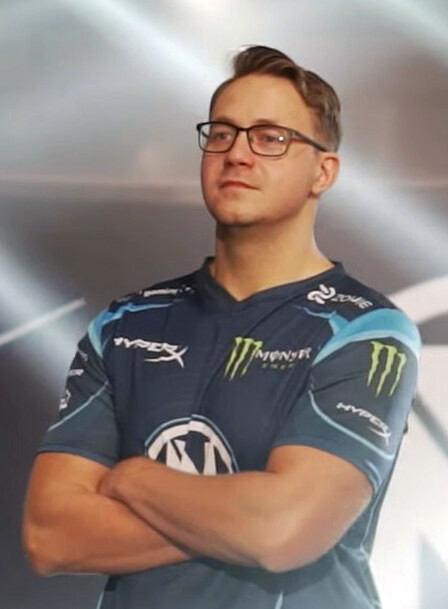
- Hawelka in 2016

Personal information
- Name: Dennis Hawelka
- Born: March 22, 1987; Germany
- Died: November 8, 2017 (aged 30); Santa Monica, California

Career information
- Games: Overwatch; League of Legends
- Playing career: 2015–2017
- Coaching career: 2017

Team history

As player:
- 2016: IDDQD
- 2016–2017: Team EnVyUs

As coach:
- 2017: Rogue (Note: Temporary coach)
- 2017: Team Liquid

Career highlights and awards
- OGN APEX champion (2016); MLG Vegas champion (2016)

Dennis Hawelka (March 22, 1987 – November 8, 2017), also known as InternetHulk, was a German professional esports player and coach. He rose to prominence in 2016, after establishing and playing for team IDDQD in the beta release of Overwatch. He went on to play for Team EnVyUs, winning several major tournaments, including season one of Overwatch Apex. In mid-2017, he transitioned to a coaching position for Team Liquid's Overwatch team, and later for their League of Legends team.

Hawelka died in November 2017 due to an enlarged heart. Several tributes were made in his name, including the Overwatch League's annual Dennis Hawelka Award.

== Early life ==
Hawelka was born in Neuss, Germany, to Jürgen and Gisela Hawelka on March 22, 1987.

== Career ==
Hawelka's esports career began with playing a multitude of game titles, including World of Warcraft, League of Legends, StarCraft 2, and Call of Duty 1 and 2. He won three World of Warcraft: Wrath of the Lich King titles and was the first player in the world to reach the "Challenger" rank in season four of League of Legends. He also played for Team Germany for Call of Duty 1 and 2.

Hawelka began his Overwatch career in February 2016, founding and playing for team IDDQD. From February to April 2016, during Overwatch's closed beta, he and the team did not lose a single series, and on April 23, 2016, they were signed by Team EnVyUs. As the captain of the team, Hawelka led EnVyUs to a 57-game winning streak, spanning from June 11 to August 22, 2016. He and the team went on to win the first season of Overwatch Apex, the premier Overwatch tournament series in South Korea, after defeating Afreeca Freecs Blue in the Grand Finals match in December 2016. The same month, they won the MLG Vegas Overwatch Invitational, after defeating FaZe Clan 4–0 in the finals. He also played for Team Germany in the 2016 and 2017 Overwatch World Cups. A month after a top-eight finish at Apex season 2 in March 2017, Hawelka departed from EnVyUs.

In late April 2017, Hawelka was signed by Rogue as a temporary coach and strategic analyst for Apex season three. He was then signed by Team Liquid as the team's head coach on June 2, 2017. Following the disbandment of Team Liquid's Overwatch division, Team Liquid picked up Hawelka as a coach for their League of Legends division for their upcoming 2018 season. Prior to his death in November 2017, Team Liquid co-CEO and owner Steve Arhancet planned to promote Hawelka to the team's head coach.

== Death ==
Hawelka died on November 7, 2017, in Santa Monica, California. His death was announced the following day by Team Liquid owners Victor Goossen and Steve Arhancet via a statement on Twitter. While some initial reports stated that the cause of death was due to complications associated with tonsillitis, a forensic investigation revealed that his death was caused by an enlarged heart.

Following his death, the Overwatch community organized the "Hulktastic Cup", a charity tournament to honor Hawelka and his contributions to the Overwatch community, which took place on November 11, 2017. The tournament raised over US$10,000 for charity and his family.

On November 16, 2017, Blizzard Entertainment added a tribute to Hawelka in Overwatch. A white flower, candle, and symbol were added to the German-based map of Eichenwalde. In addition, the Overwatch League created the "Dennis Hawelka Award", an annual award given to the player deemed to have made the most positive impact on the community.
