= British Hurricane =

British Overwatch esports team

- Founded: 2018
- Disbanded: 2021
- League: Overwatch Contenders
- Division: Atlantic
- Region: Europe
- Team history: British Hurricane; 2018–present
- Based in: London, United Kingdom
- Colours: Dark blue, light blue, white
- Owner: Jack Etienne
- General manager: Ysabel "Noukky" Müller
- Affiliation: London Spitfire
- Regional titles: 2; 2018 Season 1; 2020 Season 1
- Interregional titles: 1; 2018 Atlantic Showdown

British Hurricane was a British esports team for the video game Overwatch competing in Overwatch Contenders (OWC) and an academy team for the London Spitfire of the Overwatch League (OWL). The team was based in London, United Kingdom and played in the Europe region of OWC. Since inception, Hurricane won two regional and one interregional championships. In December 2021, the team announced that they would not be competing in future Contenders seasons.

== Franchise history ==
On 15 February 2018, the London Spitfire formally announced that their academy team for Overwatch Contenders Europe would be called the British Hurricane and revealed their all-European 2018 Season 1 squad. Cloud9 owner Jack Etienne worked with Code Red Esports owner Paul "ReDeYe" Chaloner and popular Overwatch YouTuber Tom "Stylosa" Stewart on helping them target the British demographic for their roster.

In their first season, the Hurricane took home the 2018 Season 1 European championship after defeating Team Gigantti 4–3 in the European Overwatch Contenders Grand Finals. Following, the team defeated North America Contenders Champions Fusion University in the 2018 Atlantic Showdown by a score of 3–1. Hurricane struggled in 2018 Season 2 – only amassing one win – and was dropped down to Contenders Trials for Season 3, where they finished atop the rankings and joined Contenders 2018 Season 3. They were able to qualify for the Season 3 playoffs but fell to Team Gigantti in the quarterfinals.

British Hurricane had a dominant performance in 2019 Season 1, as the team went a perfect 7–0 in the European region, and made it to the Europe Grand Finals for the second time in two years. However, they fell to the German-based team Angry Titans in the finals by a score of 1–4. Due to their performance in Season 1, the team qualified for the 2019 Atlantic Showdown – a double-elimination interregional tournament. After defeating Lowkey Esports in Round 1 and losing to Team Envy in the bottom-half bracket, the team was eliminated by ATL Academy by a score of 0–3, placing 5th in the tournament.

On 17 December 2021, Cloud9 announced that British Hurricane would cease operations at the end of 2021.

== Seasons overview ==
Year	Season	Region	OWC regular season				Regional playoffs	Interregional events
Year	Season	Region	Finish (Note: Placements prior to 2019 reflect standings in the team's respective group and not the entire region.)	Wins	Losses	Win %	Regional playoffs	Interregional events
British Hurricane
2018	1	Europe	1st	4	1	.800	Winners	Atlantic Showdown – Winners
2018	2	Europe	5th	1	4	.200		None held
2018	3	Europe	3rd	3	2	.600	Quarterfinals	None held
2019	1	Europe	1st	7	0	1.000	Runners-up	Atlantic Showdown – Lower Round 1
2019	2	Europe	4th	3	4	.429	Semifinals	Did not qualify
2020	1	Europe	1st	12	0	1.000	Winners	None held
Regular season record				30	11	.732		
Playoff record				9	3	.750		

== OWL buyouts and promotions ==
All Overwatch Contenders players are eligible to be promoted by their affiliated Overwatch League team or signed to any other Overwatch League during specified non-blackout periods.

=== 2018 ===
- DPS Finley "Kyb" Adisi was signed by expansion team Guangzhou Charge on 22 November.

=== 2021 ===
- Tank Ilari "Vestola" Vestola was signed by Paris Eternal as their new starting off-tank on 2 June.
- Support Oliver "Admiral" Vahar was promoted to the London Spitfire on 9 December.
