= Seagull (gamer) =

American video game streamer and retired professional Overwatch player

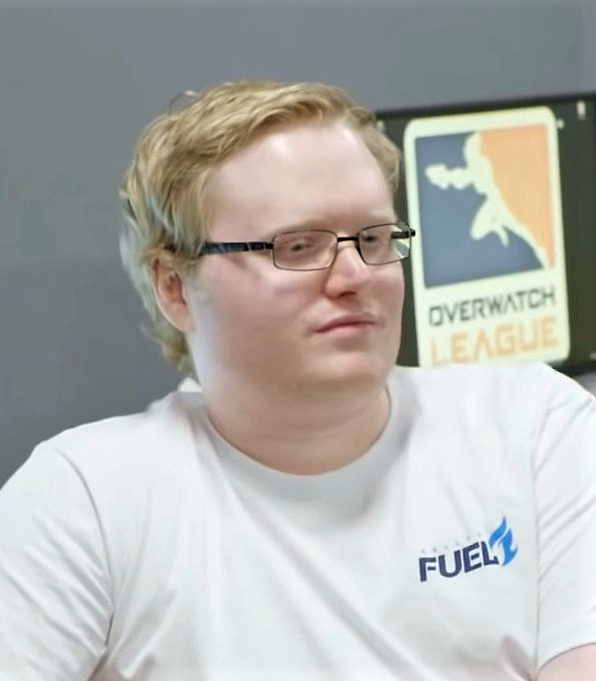
- Larned in 2018

Personal information
- Name: Brandon Larned
- Nationality: American

Career information
- Game: Overwatch
- Playing career: 2016–2018

Team history
- 2016: Luminosity Gaming
- 2016–2017: NRG Esports
- 2017: Team EnVyUs
- 2018: Dallas Fuel

Career highlights and awards
- OWL All-Star (2018)

Twitch information
- Channel: A_Seagull
- Years active: 2010–present
- Followers: 1.1 million
- Last updated: November 2022

Brandon Larned, better known as Seagull, is an American video game streamer and retired professional Overwatch player. Early in the game's history, Larned established himself as one of the most popular Overwatch streamers on Twitch.

As an esports competitor, Larned represented Luminosity Gaming and then NRG Esports, before leaving the active roster of the latter to resume streaming full-time. He returned to competitive play with Team EnVyUs shortly before its roster became the Dallas Fuel, one of the teams in the newly launched Overwatch League.

At the end of the League's inaugural season, Larned once again announced that he would be stepping away from competitive play in favor of full-time streaming.

== Career ==
=== Early career ===
Seagull begain competitive play with Half-Life 2: Deathmatch when that game was released in late 2004: he was 12 years old at the time. (The handle "Seagull" comes from a prank he played in his Half-Life 2: Deathmatch days.) After approximately mid-2008 he switched to playing competitive Team Fortress 2. In Team Fortress 2, Seagull was a respected player, specializing in the Soldier character class, and was a member of the tournament competition team Classic Mixup.

Larned was invited to Overwatch's public beta, and during the beta he streamed the game on Twitch. Despite his own modest expectations, Larned's streams regularly pulled 30,000 concurrent viewers and made him one of the game's most popular figures.

During the beta, Larned played for the team Not Enigma alongside his regular streaming. He then went on to co-found team Mixup, alongside fellow former-Team Fortress 2 players Yomar "Milo" Toledo, Carl "Enigma" Yangsheng, Anthony "Harbleu" Ballo, Brian "Pierow" Alesandr, and James "Esper" Southall.

A month prior to Overwatch's official release, Mixup signed with Luminosity Gaming, an organization that fields teams across several esports, using their players' popularity to attract sponsors, and paying their players salaries in return. Larned became Luminosity's star player, and by May 2016 the team amassed a 60% win-rate over 56 tournament games, good enough to be considered the second-best North American team behind Cloud9, and the fourth-best team in the world.

=== NRG ===
On July 24, 2016, Shaquille O'Neal, a co-owner of NRG Esports, sent a tweet directed at Larned, inviting him and his team to join O'Neal's organization. A week later, Luminosity announced that Larned and his teammates had declined to renew their contracts, and on August 4, 2016, NRG announced that they had signed Larned. Larned was joined on NRG by four other former ex-Luminosity players; Milo and Enigma from the original Mixer roster, as well as Daniel "Gods" Graeser and Mark "Pookz" Rendon, who joined the team later on. The sixth player, Tim "Dummy" Olson, played for another multi-esport organization, Team Liquid, before joining NRG. Throughout 2016 NRG remained a popular team, despite lacking top results in tournament play. In October of that year they were one of four non-Korean teams to receive invitations to Season 1 of the Korean OGN APEX tournament.

In the 2016 Overwatch World Cup, fans from each participating nation selected four of their team's six players through a vote, with the player receiving the most votes becoming the captain. The captain then selected the remaining two players on their team. Larned received 57% of the vote, 24% higher than the next most-voted American player, and was named captain of the United States team. The United States team were knocked out by eventual tournament winners South Korea, who named the United States team as their toughest challenge.

In April 2017, Larned stepped down from the active roster of NRG, remaining on the team as a substitute and as a streamer under their brand. Larned tweeted that he was struggling to juggle his roles as a competitive tournament player and as a streamer, and mentioned that, with the Overwatch League set to launch in a few months, the number of tournaments available for him to compete in had decreased significantly.

=== EnVyUs and Dallas Fuel ===
Larned went on to join Team EnVyUs in September of that year. EnVyUs was already one of the most successful teams in the world, with several major tournament wins, including the season of OGN APEX that Larned competed in. Larned claimed that several teams were vying for his signature, and picking EnVyUs was an incredibly difficult decision, but that he accepted their offer because of the team's culture, history of winning, and strong organization. He joined as a rotation player, with the team owner explaining that players would be rotated in and out on a per-map basis. The team immediately went on to win the inaugural season of the Contenders North America tournament, going undefeated over the six-week event.

The same month that Larned signed with EnVyUs, Overwatch publisher Blizzard Entertainment announced that EnVyUs had purchased a franchise slot in the Overwatch League, and would compete as the Dallas Fuel. Larned was announced as a member of the Fuel roster the following month.

The Dallas Fuel entered the inaugural season with high expectations. ESPN placed them as fourth out of the 12 teams in their preseason rankings, PC Gamer placed them third, and several other rankings also had them in the top four. However, the team struggled extensively, ending the season with 12 wins and 28 losses. Several suspensions and the eventual release of starting tank player Félix "xQc" Lengyel and internal conflict among players hampered the team, especially early in the season; half of the team's 12 wins were in the final ten games.

On August 7, 2018, Larned announced that he would once again be retiring from competitive play to focus on streaming, stating that during his time on the Fuel, he gained 40 pounds and developed sleep apnea.
