= Uprising Academy =

American Overwatch team

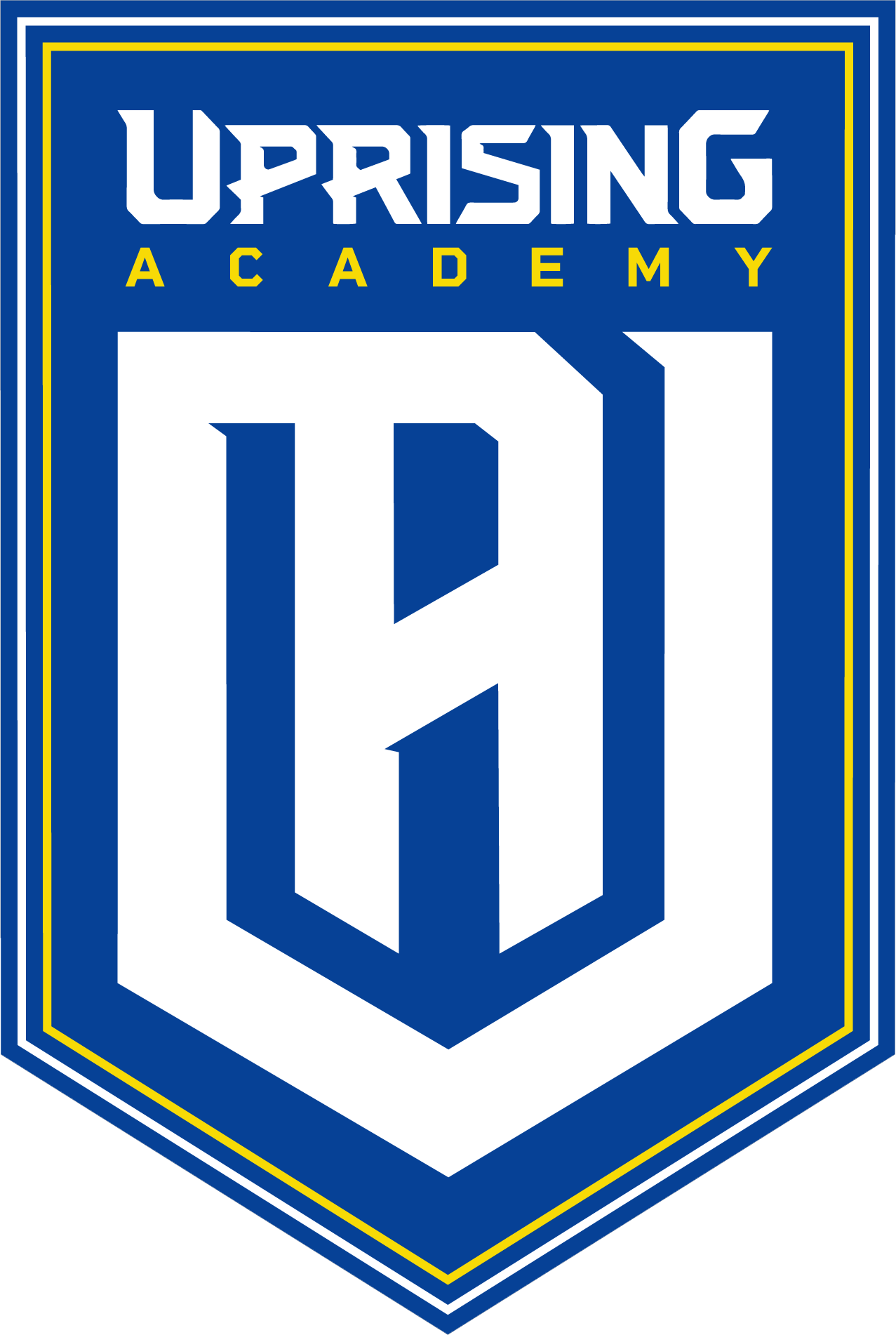
- Founded: 2016
- League: Overwatch Contenders
- Division: America
- Region: North America
- Team history: Toronto Esports; 2016–2018; Uprising Academy; 2018–present
- Based in: Boston, Massachusetts
- Colors: Blue, yellow, white
- Owner: Robert Kraft
- Head coach: Amir "Amir" Ahmed
- Affiliation: Boston Uprising

Uprising Academy is an American esports team for the video game Overwatch competing in Overwatch Contenders (OWC) and an academy team for the Boston Uprising of the Overwatch League (OWL). The franchise played its first four seasons as Toronto Esports; shortly after being purchased by the Kraft Group, the team rebranded as Uprising Academy due to a naming rights issue with Toronto Defiant. The team is based in Boston, Massachusetts and recently played in the North American region of OWC.

== Franchise history ==
=== 2016–2018: Toronto Esports ===
Toronto Esports Club, a multi-game esports organization, announced their intention to enter the competitive Overwatch scene under the name Toronto Esports on August 6 with the hiring of Chris "HuK" Loranger as the team's Overwatch consultant manager; a month later, the club announced their first professional Overwatch roster. Toronto Esports competed in North America Contenders 2017 Season 0, but failed to qualify for 2017 Season 1.

On February 19, 2018, Uprising announced that Toronto Esports would be competing as Boston's academy team in Contenders for 2018 Season 1. In their first season as an affiliate team, Toronto made it to the North America Grand Finals, where the team fell 1–4 to Fusion University. The team again qualified for the playoffs in 2018 Season 2, where they faced Fusion University in the quarterfinals; although the match was closer than their Grand Finals match the previous season, Toronto lost 2–3.

In November 2018, Blizzard Entertainment informed Toronto Esports Club that the team must drop the word "Toronto" from its Overwatch team brand, as the new Overwatch League expansion team Toronto Defiant had "exclusive naming rights" in the city. The club responded by attempting to disband their Overwatch team altogether, posting on Twitter,

We have been informed by Blizzard that we will be forced to remove 'Toronto' from our brand in only 6 weeks. Mid Contenders season 3. The reason cited: @TorontoDefiant have purchased 'exclusive naming rights.' We will be leaving Overwatch effective immediately. Good riddance.

However, Loranger clarified that the Kraft organization still owned all the rights to the players, coaches, and the Contenders slot held by the team and would continue to compete in Contenders, albeit under a new brand.

=== 2018–present: Uprising Academy ===
On November 28, 2018, the team officially announced that they would be competing under the name Uprising Academy. In 2018 Season 3, Uprising qualified for the playoffs, but fell to XL2 Academy in the quarterfinals. The team did not qualify for the playoffs the following season, posting a 1–6 record, and marking the first time they failed to qualify for the playoffs since becoming an OWL affiliate team. In 2019 Season 2, Uprising Academy finished the regular season with a 5–2 record to qualify for the NA East regional playoffs. However, the team fell to the Gladiators Legion in the NA East quarterfinals match.

In 2021, Uprising Academy announced it would be playing in OWC Korea for 2021 season 1.

In May 2021, Uprising Academy announced its return to North America for Contenders Trials Season 2.

In October 2022, Uprising Academy announced that it would no longer be competing in Overwatch Contenders 2022.

== Seasons overview ==
Year	Season	Region	OWC regular season				Regional playoffs	Interregional events
Year	Season	Region	Finish (Note: Placements in 2017 Season 0 and all of 2018 reflect standings in the team's respective group and not the entire region.)	Wins	Losses	Win %	Regional playoffs	Interregional events
Toronto Esports
2017	0	North America	3rd	1	3	.250		None held
2017	1	North America	Did not qualify					None held
2018	1	North America	1st	4	1	.800	Runners-up	
2018	2	North America	4th	2	3	.400	Quarterfinals	None held
Uprising Academy
2018	3	North America	4th	2	3	.400	Quarterfinals	None held
2019	1	North America East	8th	1	6	.143		
2019	2	North America East	3rd	5	2	.714	Quarterfinals	
2020	1	North America	8th	1	2	.333		None held
2020	2	North America	–	0	1	.000	None held	The Gauntlet: NA – Lower Round 4
Regular season record				16	21	.432		
Playoff record				2	4	.333		

== Current roster ==
Uprising Academy roster
Players
Coaches

Role	Handle	Name	Nationality
Damage	Arrow	Park Min-seok	South Korea
Damage	Yoppin	Song Yu-bin	South Korea
Tank	ITSAL (2W)	Kim Chang-hee	South Korea
Tank	Cowha	Jang Hyeong-seok	South Korea
Tank	BONO	Kang Yeong-seo	South Korea
Support	Aiden	Lee Seung-jun	South Korea
Support	Simple	Kim Ji-Sung	South Korea

Head coach

- Lee “P1ko” Youn-seok

Legend:
- (I) Inactive
- (S) Suspended
- (2W) Two-way player
- Substitute
- (injured) Injury / Illness

Latest roster transaction: August 15, 2022.

== OWL buyouts and promotions ==
All Overwatch Contenders players are eligible to be promoted by their affiliated Overwatch League team or signed to any other Overwatch League during specified non-blackout periods.

=== 2018 ===
- Support Harrison "Kruise" Pond was signed by new expansion franchise Paris Eternal on October 23.
- Tank Park "Axxiom" Min-seob and DPS Kelsey "Colourhex" Birse were promoted to Boston Uprising on October 30.
- DPS Charlie "nero" Zwarg and support Kim "Shu" Jin-seo were signed to Guangzhou Charge on November 22.

=== 2019 ===
- Tank Cameron "Fusions" Bosworth was promoted to Boston Uprising on February 12.
- Support Gabriel "Swimmer" Levy and tank Walid "Mouffin" Bassal were promoted to Boston Uprising on November 7, with Mouffin on a two-way contract.
- DPS Chris "MirroR" Trinh was signed to the Los Angeles Gladiators on November 12.

=== 2021 ===
- Tank Yun "GaeBullSsi" Young-sun was promoted to Boston Uprising on April 16.
- DPS Lim "Finale" Jung-woo was signed to the Toronto Defiant on December 12.
- DPS Oh "Victoria" Gi-hun was promoted to Boston Uprising on December 22.

=== 2022 ===
- Tank Kim "ITSAL" Chang-hee was promoted to Boston Uprising on March 23.

== OWL affiliates ==
Uprising Academy

- Boston Uprising (2018–present)

Toronto Esports

- Boston Uprising (2018)
