= RunAway =

Former South Korean esports team

- Founded: 2016
- League: OWCS
- Colors: Pink, blue, black
- Owners: Yoon Dae-hoon; Lee Hyun-ah
- Divisions: Overwatch 2
- Regional titles: Contenders Korea; 2018 Season 2; 2018 Season 3; 2019 Season 2

RunAway (Korean: 러너웨이) is a South Korean esports team, best known for their Overwatch division that competed in Overwatch Apex and Overwatch Contenders (OWC). The team was founded in 2016 by Yoon "Runner" Dae-hoon and is co-owned with his wife Lee "Flowervin" Hyun-ah. RunAway has competed in numerous major tournaments and fielded the team that would become the Vancouver Titans of the Overwatch League (OWL). The team's Overwatch division competed in the Korea region of OWC, and since inception, they won three OWC regional titles and four NetEase Esports X Tournament (NeXT) titles. They expanded into League of Legends in late 2019 before shutting down the division shortly afterwards. In June 2021, RunAway disbanded its Overwatch division. The organization announced its return to competitive Overwatch in February 2024.

== Overwatch ==
=== History ===
==== Overwatch APEX (2016–2017) ====
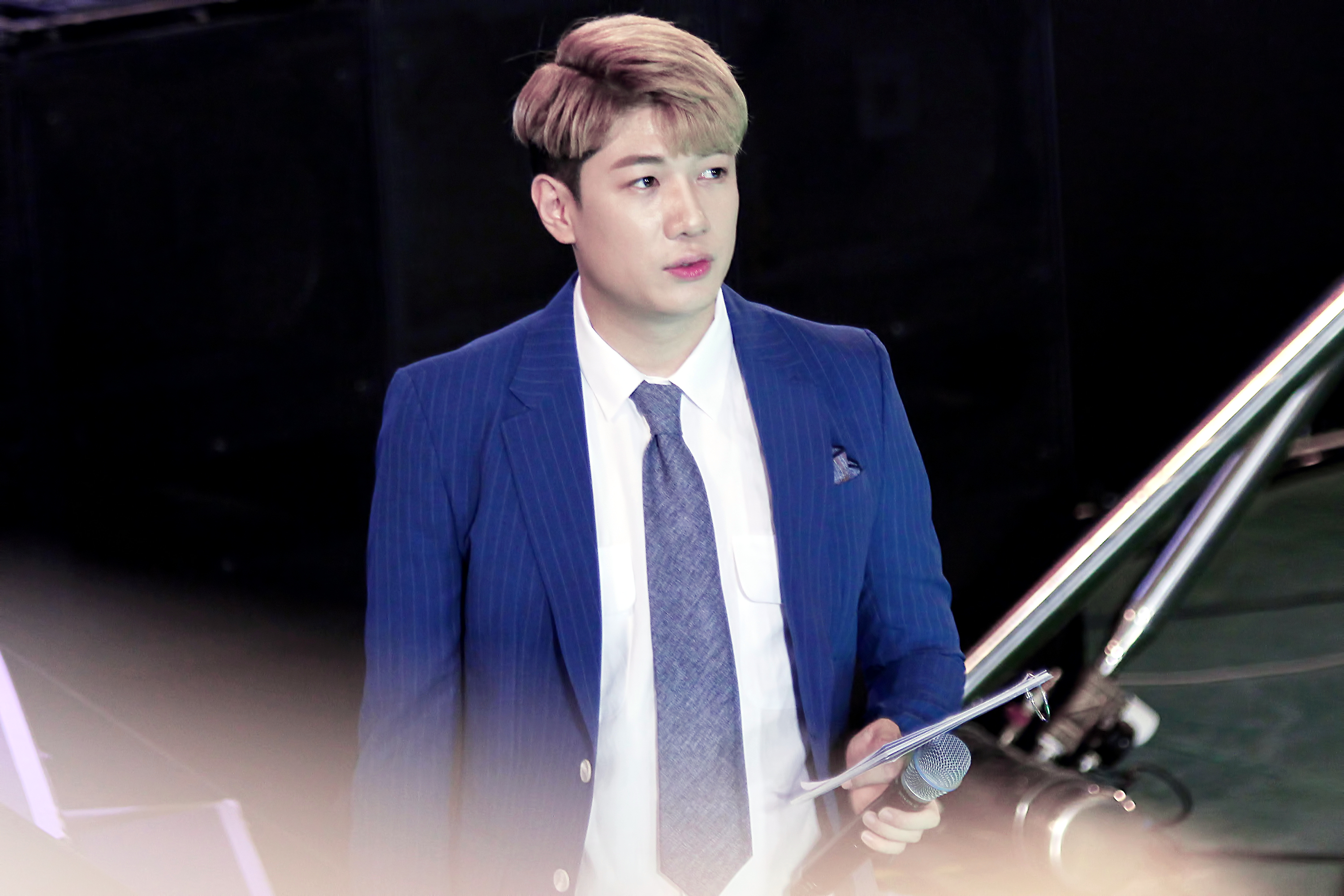
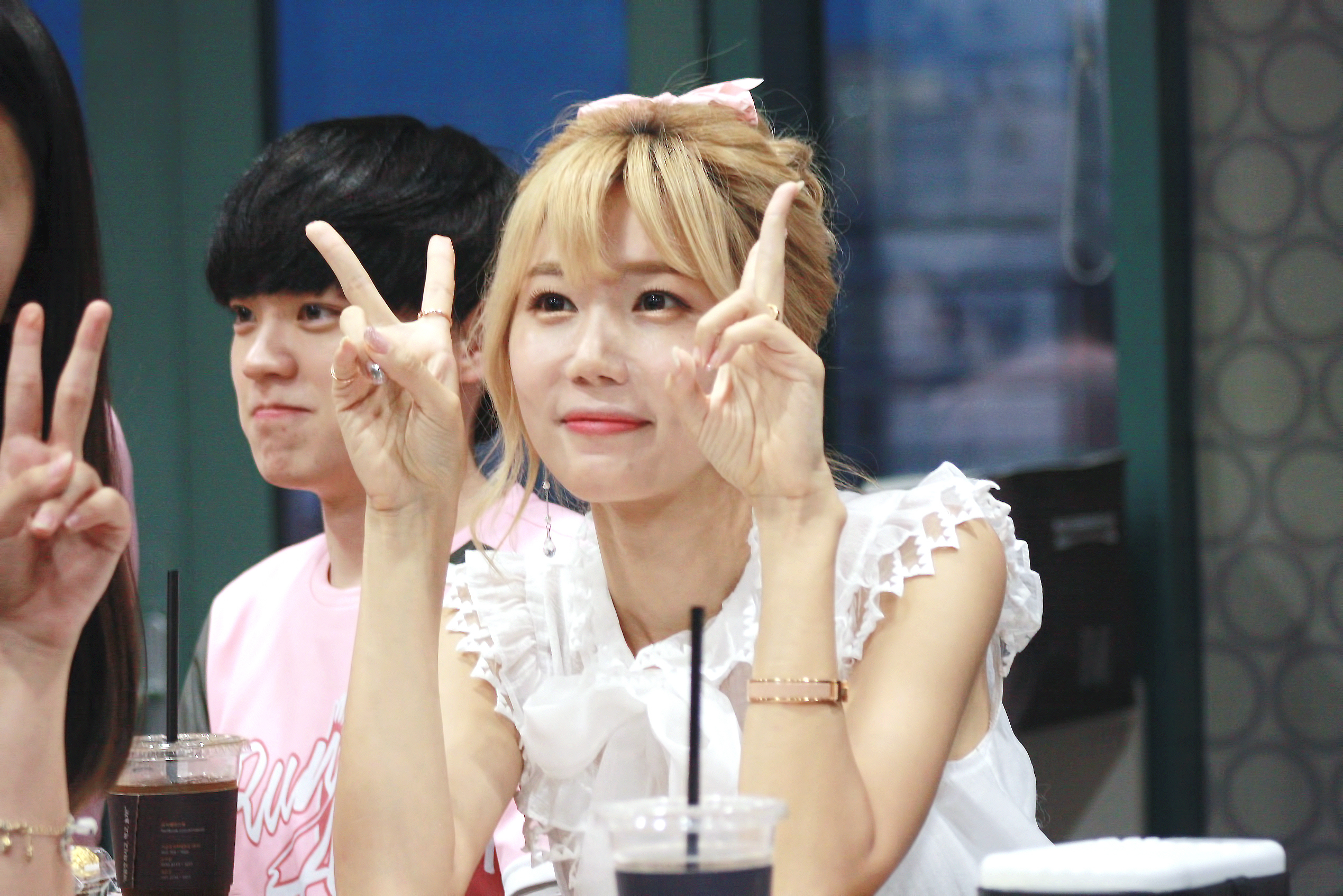
Yoon "Runner" Dae-hoon (left) and Lee "Flowervin" Hyun-ah (right)

After the release of Overwatch in 2016, League of Legends streamer Yoon "Runner" Dae-hoon created and founded the team RunAway. The team's initial roster included Kim "Shine" Min-hyuk, Kim "Mono" Hyung-sun, Kim "Haksal" Hyo-jong, Ryu "Kaiser" Sang-hoon, Seok "Quad" Joo-hyung, and Runner himself. Funded entirely by Runner, RunAway did not have a team house or analysts like many other professional Overwatch teams but was able to qualify for OGN APEX Season One, a major Overwatch tournament series in South Korea. However, they were eliminated from the tournament after going 1–2 in the group stages.

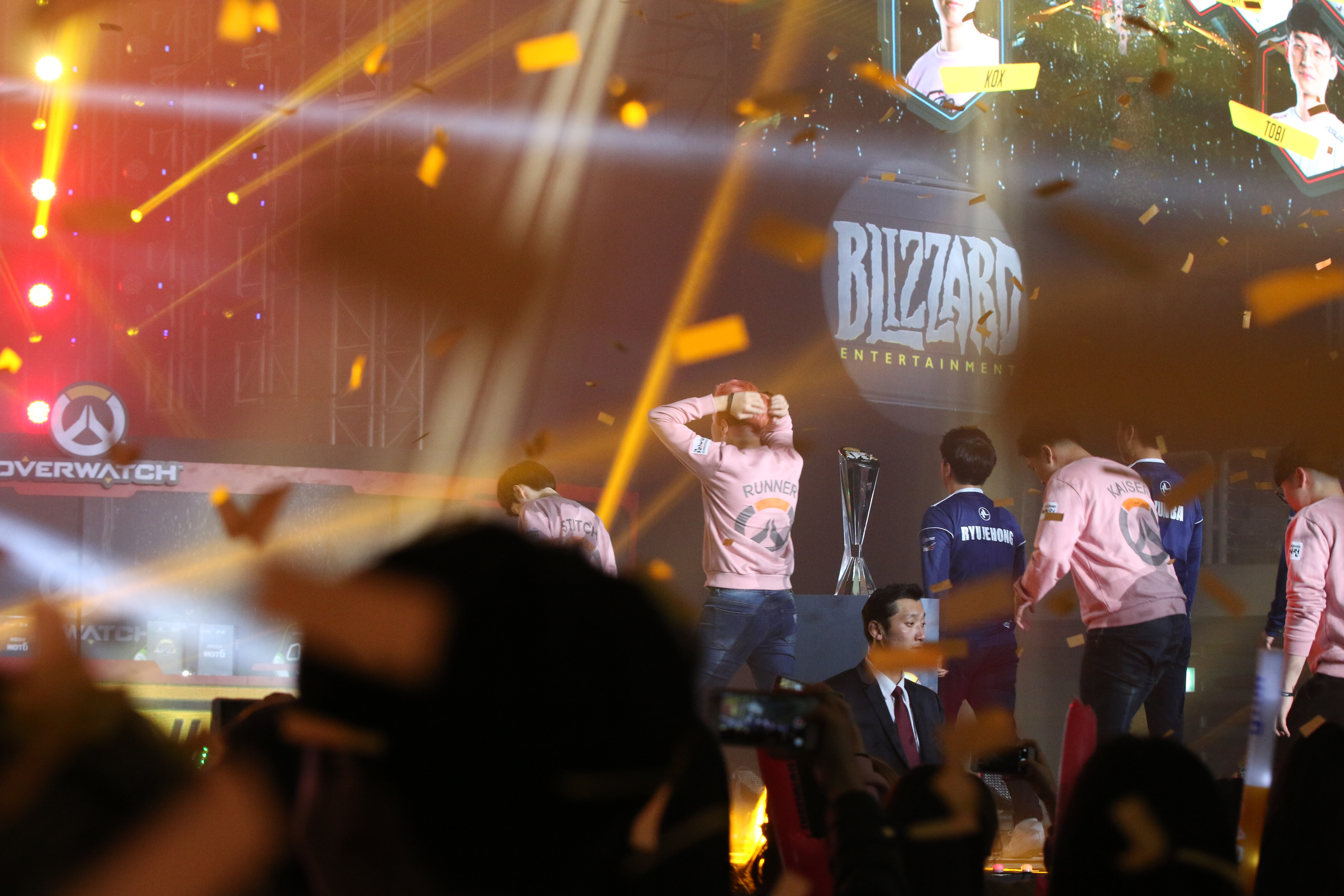
RunAway at the Overwatch Apex Season 2 Finals

After qualifying for OGN APEX Season Two, RunAway was able to make it past the two group stages and into the playoffs, where the team faced LW Blue in the semifinals. After four maps, the series was tied 2-2. In the fifth map, Kaiser, on Reinhardt, executed a five-man Earthshatter on RunAway's Eichenwalde attack to secure a victory and send RunAway to the Grand Finals. The team faced Lunatic-Hai in the finals. While RunAway took a quick 3–1 lead in the series, they dropped three consecutive maps to end the tournament in second place.

With no sponsors and no team house for practice, financial struggles burdened the team during APEX Season Three. Main Tank Kaiser left the team to join Cloud9 only two matches into the season; Runner noted that the Kaiser's decision to leave was to find a more stable income. In APEX, RunAway failed to advance past the first round of the group stages. In the following weeks, two players and team coach Kim "Nomy" Min-yong left the team.

Needing more time and income to support his family and feeling that the players deserved a better team to play on, Runner considered disbanding RunAway, but his wife Lee "Flowervin" Hyun-ah convinced him to change his mind. Flowervin and Runner rented an apartment using their money from their streaming incomes and surprised the players of RunAway. The team then succeeded in securing an equipment sponsorship with Logitech, Runner decided to take on the role of the team coach, and Kaiser returned to the team after playing two months with Cloud9 as the team prepared for APEX Season Four.

During APEX Season Four, the team performed solidly in the two group stages and advanced to the playoffs, where they took on NC Foxes in the semifinals. Despite a close first map, RunAway swept NC Foxes by a score of 4–0 to advance to the Grand Finals, where they took on GC Busan. In the finals matchup, the series was tied up 3–3 after six maps. In the final map, Eichenwalde, GC Busan was able to push the payload to the end with no time remaining on their attack; RunAway was unable to complete the map, as the team fell in map seven of the APEX Grand Finals for the second time. Seven days later, the team made it to the finals of the APAC Premier 2017, major Chinese Overwatch tournament, but fell, again, to GC Busan by a 1–4 scoreline.

==== Overwatch Contenders (2018–2021) ====
In the following months after the team's loss at the APAC Premier, multiple players left the team and Runner announced that he would be stepping down from the team to serve his mandatory military service; in his stead, Flowervin took up the role as team manager. As the inception of the Overwatch League was approaching, players from all over the world were being signed to the new franchises, but all the players of RunAway decided to stay together with a core of Kim "Haksal" Hyo-jong, Choi "JJANU" Hyeon-woo, Park "Bumper" Sang-beom, and Lee "Stitch" Chung-hee. RunAway began preparing to compete in the newly formed Overwatch Contenders.

RunAway performed well in the group stages of the first season of Korean Contenders and made it to the playoffs. In the quarterfinals, the team narrowly defeated KongDoo Panthera by a score of 3–2, however, they were defeated by X6 Gaming in the semifinals.

Heading into season two of Contenders, RunAway signed Lee "Hooreg" Dong-eun from the London Spitfire to join the existing players of Haksal, Bumper, Stitch, JJANU, Twilight, SLIME, and SeoMinSoo. The team once again made it to the playoffs, where they defeated MVP Space and Element Mystic in the quarterfinals and semifinals, respectively. They faced KongDoo Panthera in the Grand Finals. The match went to 8 maps in a best-of-7 series, and RunAway emerged victorious, claiming their first ever championship. The team carried on that success into their next tournament, the 2018 Summer NetEase Esports X Tournament (NeXT), where they defeated The One Winner in the finals to claim another tournament title.

With the Overwatch League adding eight new expansion franchises, RunAway was expected to be picked up in its entirety by one of the expansion teams. In October 2018, Flowervin announced that her team's full roster was signed by an undisclosed Overwatch League team, later to be revealed as the Vancouver Titans.

Under an entirely new roster, RunAway continued their dominance in 2018 Season Three of Contenders, bolstering one of the most statistically successful iterations of the organization. The team defeated KongDoo Panthera and WGS Armament in the playoffs to move on to the Korea regional finals. RunAway defeated Element Mystic in the finals to claim their second Overwatch Contenders title. Less than a week later, the team won the 2018 Winter NetEase Esports X Tournament, their second NeXT title, defeating LGD Gaming in the finals by a score of 4–1.

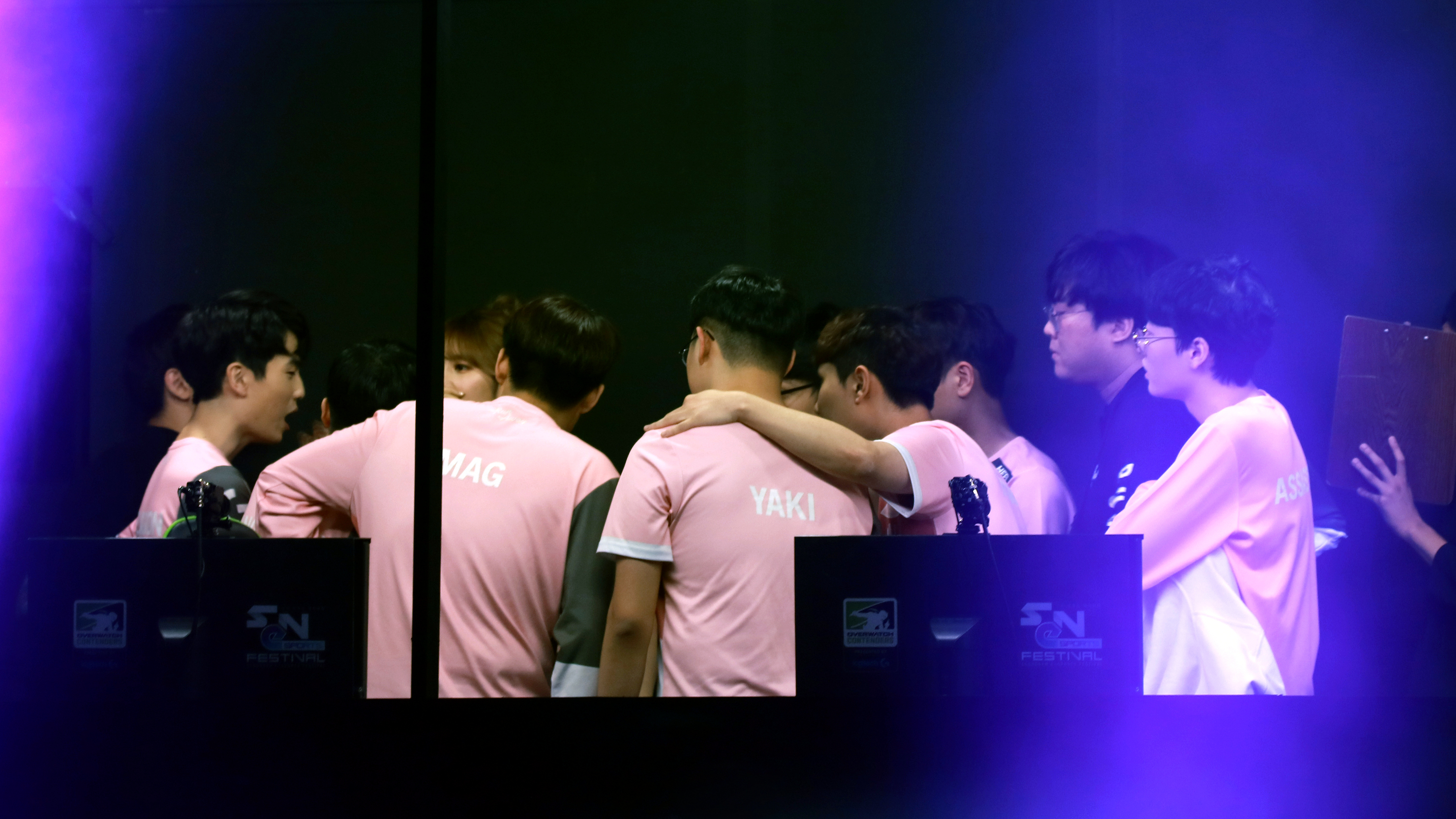
RunAway at the OWC Korea 2019 Season 2 Finals

In 2019 Season One of Contenders, RunAway claimed the top seed in the playoffs, but were eliminated in their first playoff match, the semifinals, by O2 Blast; the 0–3 loss subsequently disqualified RunAway from the Pacific Showdown. Following the loss, RunAway competed in the 2019 Spring NetEase Esports X Tournament, where they claimed their third straight NeXT title. The following season, RunAway posted a 4–3 record in the group stages to claim the fourth seed in the regional playoffs. After defeating Fusion University and O2 Blast in the quarterfinals and semifinals, respectively, the team took on Element Mystic in the finals. After five maps, RunAway held a 3–2 lead, as the match went to King's Row. Led by a stellar performance by DPS Jeong "Heesu" Hee-su on Hanzo, RunAway won the map in overtime rounds to claim their third Overwatch Contenders title. Due to their regional title, the team qualified as the top seed in The Gauntlet, an interregional, Contenders tournament. Bypassing the group stages due to their seed, RunAway first took down Gen.G Esports, 3–0, in the upper-bracket semifinals of the double-elimination tournament. In the winners' final, the team fell to Element Mystic, sending them to the lower bracket finals. The team was eliminated in lower bracket finals, losing to ATL Academy and finishing the tournament in third place. The following month, RunAway competed in the 2019 Autumn NeXT tournament, finishing in second place after falling to Element Mystic in the finals, 3–4.

In the 2020 season, RunAway finished as the runners-up in Season 2. In 2021 Season 1, they finished in fifth.

In June 2021, RunAway disbanded its Overwatch division.

==== Overwatch Champions Series (2024–present) ====
On February 14, 2024, Runner announced on Twitter that RunAway would be returning to competitive play for the inaugural Overwatch Champions Series season.

=== Roster ===
RunAway roster
Players
Coaches

Role	Handle	Name	Nationality
Damage	JaeWoo	Kim Jae-woo	South Korea
Damage	Zest	Kim Hyun-woo	South Korea
Damage	Prophet	Kim Hyun-been	South Korea
Tank	Mag	Kim Tae-sung	South Korea
Support	LeeJaeGon	Lee Jae-gon	South Korea
Support	Vigilante	Kim Joon	South Korea

Head coach

- Kim "Chara" Jung-yeon

Legend:
- (I) Inactive
- (S) Suspended
- Substitute
- (injured) Injury / Illness

Roster updated February 14, 2024.

=== Seasons overview ===
==== Overwatch Contenders ====
Year	Season	Region	OWC regular season				Regional playoffs	Interregional events
Year	Season	Region	Finish	Wins	Losses	Win %	Regional playoffs	Interregional events
2018	1	Korea	1st (Note: Placement reflects standings in the team's respective group and not the entire region.)	4	1	.800	Semifinals	None held
2018	2	Korea	2nd	4	1	.800	Winners	None held
2018	3	Korea	1st	5	0	1.000	Winners	None held
2019	1	Korea	1st	6	1	.857	Semifinals	Pacific Showdown – Did not qualify
2019	2	Korea	4th	4	3	.571	Winners	The Gauntlet – Lower Finals
2020	1	Korea	6th	5	4	.556	Runners-up	Pacific Showdown – Did not qualify
2020	2	Korea	2nd	3	1	.750	Runners-up	The Gauntlet – Lower Finals
2021	1	Korea	3rd	2	2	.500	Round three	None held
Regular season record				33	13	.717		
Playoff record				18	6	.750		

==== Other tournaments ====
- 2nd – Overwatch APEX Season 2
- 2nd – Overwatch APEX Season 4
- 2nd – Overwatch APAC Premier 2017
- 1st – 2018 Summer NetEase Esports X Tournament
- 1st – 2018 Winter NetEase Esports X Tournament
- 1st – 2019 Spring NetEase Esports X Tournament
- 2nd – 2019 Autumn NetEase Esports X Tournament
- 1st – 2020 Summer NetEase Esports X Tournament

== League of Legends ==
In November 2019, Runner was in negotiations to acquire a League of Legends Challengers Korea team. The following month, RunAway announced its inaugural roster, consisting of top laner Shin "Seraph" Woo-yeong, mid laner Lee "Edge" Ho-seong, bot laner Lim "Moo" Mu-heon, support Jang "Zzus" Joon-soo, and junglers Kim "Crush" Jun-seo and Kim "Bluff" Hyeon-jun. The team competed in the Challengers Korea 2020 Spring Qualifiers, where they finished atop their group in the group stages but fell in the elimination match to Nine Tale. Failing to qualify for the Spring Split 2020, the club released the entirety of its roster and technical staff so that they could possibly find another team in the following months.
