= Team Envy Overwatch =

Overwatch team representing Team Envy

Team Envy
- Game: Overwatch
- Founded: 2016
- League: Overwatch Contenders
- Division: Atlantic
- Region: North America West
- Team history: Team EnVyUs; 2016–2017; Team Envy; 2018–2020
- Based in: Dallas, Texas
- Colors: Dark blue, blue, black
- Owner: Envy Gaming
- Affiliation: Dallas Fuel
- Regional titles: 3; 2017 Season 1; 2019 Season 1; 2019 Season 2
- Interregional titles: 0
- Website: Official website

The Team Envy Overwatch team represented Team Envy, an American esports franchise, in the video game Overwatch. Originally competing under the name Team EnVyUs, the team won multiple regional and international competitions before being transferred to the Dallas Fuel franchise of the Overwatch League (OWL) by their parent organization, Envy Gaming. The franchise reestablished its Overwatch division in 2018 and currently competes in the North America West region of Overwatch Contenders (OWC) as an academy team for the Dallas Fuel. The division disbanded in April 2020.

== Franchise history ==
=== 2016–2017: Pre-Overwatch League ===
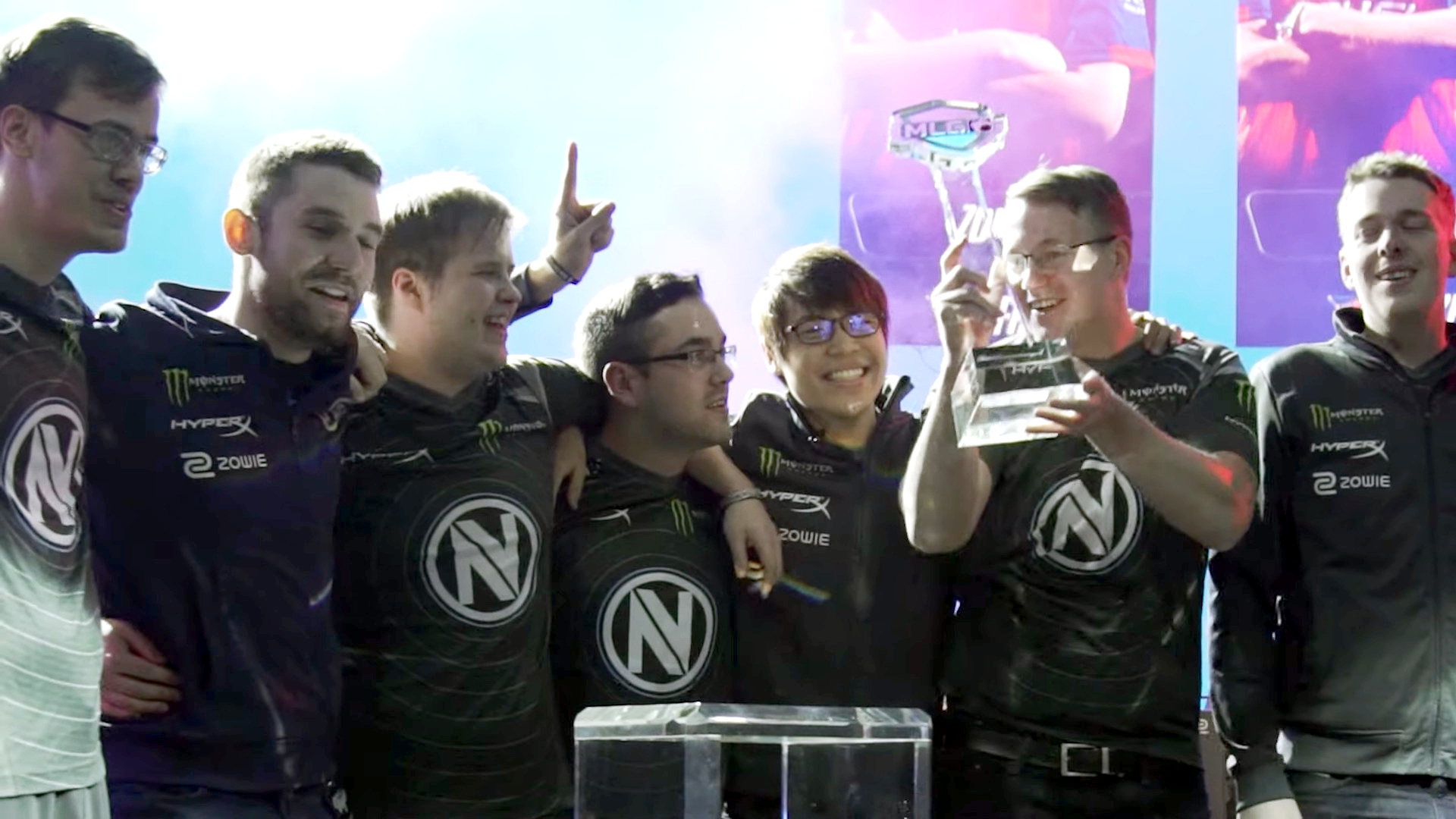
Team EnVyUs won MLG Vegas 2016. From left to right: chipshajen, TazMo, Taimou, HarryHook, Mickie, INTERNETHULK, cocco.

Formed during the Overwatch closed beta in February 2016, Team EnVyUs acquired the players of Team Hubris, a North American squad that finished first in six of the seven tournaments played during the beta, to officially create their Overwatch esports division. Even though their original roster showed some early promise in online tournaments, just prior to the official launch of Overwatch, the team disbanded. A week later, EnVyUs formed a roster by looking abroad, eventually bringing players from across Europe to their Charlotte headquarters and securing the core of what would become the Dallas Fuel in Sebastian "chipshajen" Widlund, Christian "cocco" Jonsson, Jonathan "HarryHook" Tejedor Rua, and Timo "Taimou" Kettunen.

Amassing a 57-game winning streak, the new roster showed why they were widely considered the best team in the world. However, their early dominance resulted in disappointing results, when, as heavy favorites, the team failed to win either of their first two LAN tournaments. It was not until the arrival of Pongphop "Mickie" Rattanasangchod as a stand-in that Team EnVyUs had their first taste of success, winning Season 1 of OGN's Overwatch Apex in Seoul, Korea, marking the first time that a Western-owned team had taken home an esports title on Korean soil. They soon followed it up with a victory on home soil, winning the Overwatch North American Invitational at MLG Vegas. With their back-to-back tournament wins, Team EnVyUs ended 2016 once again in contention for the title of best team in the world.

In January 2017, just prior to Season 2 of OGN's Overwatch APEX, it was announced that Kyle "KyKy" Sounder would try out as coach for the team. However, even with the addition, Season 2 was disappointing after the team was eliminated in the second round of group stages. Hoping to improve in Season 3 and re-find their 2016 form, the team recruited Hwang "EFFECT" Hyeon; however, the tournament also proved to be a let-down, after the team placed 4th. Returning home from Korea, Team EnVyUs ended their pre-Overwatch League journey on a high, going undefeated and winning Season 1 of North America's Overwatch Contenders. The tournament's playoffs marked both the debut of Brandon "Seagull" Larned, as well as the final event played under the "Team EnVyUs" moniker.

On September 20, 2017, Blizzard officially announced that Envy Gaming had acquired the Dallas-based Overwatch League franchise spot, making them one of twelve teams competing in the inaugural season. The team was branded as the Dallas Fuel, and all of the existing members of Team EnVyUs were transferred to the Fuel roster – ending Team Envy's Overwatch division.

=== 2018–2020: Rejoining Contenders ===
On July 2, 2018, the Envy Gaming formally announced Team Envy's return to Overwatch Contenders as an academy team for the Dallas Fuel, as the team acquired EnVision Esports' Contenders slot and roster and signed former Team EnVyUs member Ronnie "Talespin" DuPree. The team rejoined Contenders in season two of 2018, where they finished the North American group stages with a 4–1 and qualified for the playoffs. After a close victory against Last Night's Leftovers in the quarterfinals, Envy was swept by Philadelphia Fusion's academy team Fusion University in the semifinals. The following season, Envy again qualified for the North American playoffs but fell to Fusion University in the quarterfinals.

In 2019 Season 1 of Contenders, Team Envy posted a perfect 7–0 record in the group stages to claim the top seed in the North American West region. The team cruised through the regional playoffs, defeating NRG Esports in the semifinals and ATL Academy in the finals by a combined map record of 7–1 to claim their second Overwatch Contenders regional title. Following their regional title, Envy was one of three North American teams that qualified for the Atlantic Showdown, an interregional double-elimination tournament. In the tournament, Envy took down London Spitfire's academy team British Hurricane in the first round, but fell to Fusion University in their next match. Following this, the team defeated Angry Titans to again face Fusion University in the finals. Fusion had been the only team to ever defeat Envy in a post-season matchup, and that distinction was reinforced, as Envy lost the finals by a score of 0–4. Envy continued their dominance in 2019 Season 2 of Contenders, posting another perfect 7–0 record in the group stages. The team took out Second Wind in the NA West semifinals and defeated the New York Excelsior's academy team XL2 Academy in the finals to secure their third Contenders regional title. Due to their regional title, the team qualified as for The Gauntlet, an interregional, Contenders tournament. After advancing past the group stages, Envy was eliminated from the tournament after losing to XL2 Academy, 0–3, in their first match.

On April 27, 2020, Team Envy disbanded their Overwatch Contenders division.

== Seasons overview ==
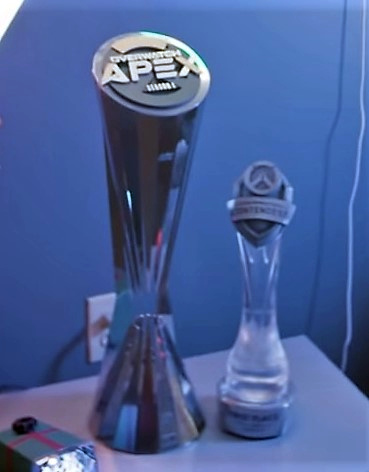
Team Envy have won multiple competitive Overwatch titles, including OGN Apex and Contenders.

=== Overwatch Contenders ===
Year	Season	Region	OWC regular season				Regional playoffs	Interregional events
Year	Season	Region	Finish (Note: Placements in 2018 reflect standings in the team's respective group and not the entire region.)	Wins	Losses	Win %	Regional playoffs	Interregional events
Team EnVyUs
2017	1	North America	1st	7	0	1.000	Winners	None held
Team Envy
2018	1	Did not compete						
2018	2	North America	2nd	4	1	.800	Semifinals	None held
2018	3	North America	4th	2	3	.400	Quarterfinals	None held
2019	1	North America West	1st	7	0	1.000	Winners	Atlantic Showdown – Runners-up
2019	2	North America West	1st	7	0	1.000	Winners	The Gauntlet – Lower Round 1
2020	1	North America	DNF (Note: Team Envy withdrew from Contenders after the first week.)	2	1	.667		
Regular season record				29	5	.853		
Playoff record				7	2	.778		

=== Other tournaments ===
- 1st – OG Invitational
- 2nd – Overwatch Open
- 1st – Overwatch APEX Season 1
- 1st – Major League Gaming Vegas 2016
- 4th – Overwatch APEX Season 3

== OWL buyouts and promotions ==
All Overwatch Contenders players are eligible to be promoted by their affiliated Overwatch League team or signed to any other Overwatch League during specified non-blackout periods.

=== 2019 ===
- Tank Caleb "McGravy" McGarvey was signed by Florida Mayhem on February 22.
- Tank Ashley "Trill" Powell was promoted to the Dallas Fuel on May 7.
- Tank Elliot "ELLIVOTE" Vaneryd and tank Lukas "LullSiSH" Wiklund were signed by Washington Justice on July 14.
- DPS Jason "Jaru" White was signed by the Los Angeles Gladiators on December 12.

=== 2020 ===
- Support William "Crimzo" Hernandez was promoted to the Dallas Fuel on February 3.

== OWL affiliates ==
Team Envy

- Dallas Fuel (2018–2020)
