= NYXL Academy =

American Overwatch esports team

- Founded: 2018
- League: Overwatch Contenders
- Division: Atlantic
- Region: North America West
- Team history: XL2 Academy 2018–2019; NYXL Academy 2023–present
- Based in: New York City, New York
- Colors: Dark blue, blue, white
- Owner: Jeff Wilpon
- Affiliation: New York Excelsior

NYXL Academy, formerly XL2 Academy, is an American esports team for the video game Overwatch that competed in Overwatch Contenders (OWC) as an academy team for the New York Excelsior of the Overwatch League (OWL). The team is based in New York City, New York and plays in the North America West region of OWC. Since inception, NYXL Academy has qualified for the playoffs in every season of play. XL2 took a hiatus from OWC play beginning in November 2019. The team returned to play in 2023, under the name NYXL Academy.

== Franchise history ==
=== XL2 Academy (2018–2019) ===
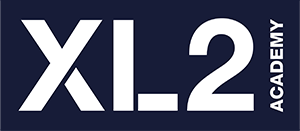
XL2 Academy logo

On February 20, 2018, New York Excelsior formally announced their academy team would go under the name "XL2 Academy" for Overwatch Contenders North America, as well as revealing their initial 6-player squad, where notably, 17-year-old star DPS player Hwang "Fl0w3R" Yeon-oh was not on the roster, as he was waiting to become eligible for the Overwatch League. Shortly afterwards, on March 24, they announced that Fl0w3R would be joining the academy roster. The 17-year-old had been an inactive member of parent team Excelsior, after being deemed ineligible to compete in the inaugural Overwatch League season due to age restrictions.

XL2 began play in the North America region of Contenders 2018 Season 1. In their first season of play, XL2 qualified for the playoffs, but fell to EnVision eSports in the quarterfinals by a score of 2–3. The following season, the team posted a perfect 5–0 in the group stages and qualified for the playoffs. After defeating Mayhem Academy and NRG Esports in the quarterfinals and semifinals, respectively, XL2 went on to face Fusion University in the North America Grand Finals; however, XL2 was swept 0–4 in the contest. In 2018 Season 3, XL2 again qualified for the playoffs, where they defeated Uprising Academy in the quarterfinals. The team went on to lose to ATL Academy in the semifinals by a score of 1–3.

In 2019, XL2 was forced to rebuild their roster after new regional lock rules came into effect. XL2 posted a meager 2–5 record in the 2019 Season 1 group stages. Nonetheless, the team qualified for the playoffs for the fourth time in four seasons, where they were swept 0–3 in the first round to ATL Academy. The team found more success in 2019 Season 2, posting a 5–2 record in the group stages; in the playoffs, XL2 made it to the finals, but they were unable to secure their first title, as the team was defeated by Team Envy in the finals match. Due to their regional performance, the team qualified for The Gauntlet, an interregional, Contenders tournament. Advancing past the group stages, XL2 first took down Team Envy in a 3–0 sweep, but in their next match, they were swept, 0–3, by ATL Academy, eliminating them from the tournament.

On November 11, 2019, XL2 announced that they would be temporarily ceasing play in Contenders, noting that they are "currently working with other organizations."

=== NYXL Academy (2023–present) ===
In April 2023, the New York Excelsior announced that their academy team would be returning to play, under the name NYXL Academy, in both Overwatch Contenders and Calling All Heroes.

== Seasons overview ==
Year	Season	Region	OWC regular season				Regional playoffs	Interregional events
Year	Season	Region	Finish (Note: Placements prior to 2019 reflect standings in the team's respective group and not the entire region.)	Wins	Losses	Win %	Regional playoffs	Interregional events
XL2 Academy
2018	1	North America	3rd	3	2	.600	Quarterfinals	
2018	2	North America	1st	5	0	1.000	Runners-up	None held
2018	3	North America	1st	4	1	.800	Semifinals	None held
2019	1	North America West	6th	2	5	.286	Quarterfinals	
2019	2	North America West	2nd	5	2	.714	Runners-up	The Gauntlet – Lower Round 2
Regular season record				19	10	.600		
Playoff record				4	5	.444		

== Roster ==
NYXL Academy roster
Players
Coaches

Role	Handle	Name	Nationality
Damage	Bun	Chloe	United States
Damage	sheep	–	United States
Damage	wsps	–	United States
Tank	sniper	Morrell, Cameron	United States
Tank	kindred	Rivera, Stevie	United States
Support	Dax	–	United States
Support	keroppi	–	United States
Support	Wicca	Haggerty, Veronica	United States

Head coach

- Vacant

Legend:
- (I) Inactive
- (S) Suspended
- (2W) Two-way player
- Substitute
- (injured) Injury / Illness

Roster updated May 5, 2023.

== OWL buyouts and promotions ==
All Overwatch Contenders players are eligible to be promoted by their affiliated Overwatch League team or signed to any other Overwatch League during specified non-blackout periods.

=== 2018 ===
- DPS Hwang "Fl0w3R" Yeon-oh was signed to New York Excelsior on October 29.
- DPS Jeong "Nenne" Yeon-kwan was signed to New York Excelsior on November 8.

=== 2019 ===
- Off-tank Kim "BiaNcA" Dong-wook was signed to New York Excelsior on November 22.
