= ATL Academy =

Defunct American esports team

- Founded: 2018
- Disbanded: 2020
- League: Overwatch Contenders
- Division: Atlantic
- Region: North America East
- Team history: Last Night's Leftovers; 2018; ATL Academy; 2018–2020
- Based in: Atlanta, Georgia, U.S.
- Colors: Red, charcoal, light gray
- Owner: Atlanta Esports Ventures
- Head coach: Dillain Odeneal
- Affiliation: Atlanta Reign
- Regional titles: 1; 2019 Season 2
- Interregional titles: 0

ATL Academy was an American esports team for the video game Overwatch competing in Overwatch Contenders (OWC) and an academy team for the Atlanta Reign of the Overwatch League (OWL). The franchise played its first two seasons as Last Night's Leftovers before becoming an OWL affiliate team. The team is based in Atlanta, Georgia and plays in the North America East region of OWC. Atlanta won their first Contenders regional title in Season 2 of 2019 in a 4–1 victory over Gladiators Legion. In March 2020, ATL Academy was disbanded.

== Franchise history ==
=== 2018: Last Night's Leftovers ===
The franchise began in 2018 as Last Night's Leftovers (LNL), an unsponsored Overwatch Open Division team. In 2018 Season 1, the team was promoted from the Open Division to North America Contenders Trials, where they claimed the top seed and moved to North America Overwatch Contenders 2018 Season 1. In Season 2 of 2018, LNL became the first unsponsored team in North America to beat an academy team. The team went on to qualify for the playoffs, marking the first time that a team promoted from the Open Division had made it to the Contenders playoffs.

=== 2018–present: ATL Academy ===
On November 23, 2018, the Atlanta Reign announced that Last Night's Leftovers would be competing as Atlanta's Overwatch League academy team under the name ATL Academy. The team has made it to the regional finals in 2018 Season 3, but they fell to Fusion University.

In 2019 Season 1, ATL Academy again made it to the regional finals and again, the team lost; this time it was to Team Envy. Following the regional finals, the team defeated Gladiators Legion in a qualifier match for the Atlantic Showdown, an interregional double-elimination tournament, where in the tournament, team took fourth place. In 2019 Season 2, ATL posted a perfect 7–0 win–loss record and 28–0 map record in the regular season to claim the top seed in the regional playoffs. Atlanta went on to roll through the playoffs, dropping only one map throughout its entirety, and defeated Gladiators Legion in the finals to claim their first Contenders title. Due to their regional title, the team qualified as the top seed in The Gauntlet, an interregional, Contenders tournament. Bypassing the group stages due to their seed, ATL first fell to Element Mystic, 2–3, in the upper-bracket semifinals of the double-elimination tournament. The team ran through the lower bracket, sweeping XL2 Academy, Gen.G, and RunAway to make it to the Grand Finals, where they again faced Element Mystic. ATL were unable to take down Element Mystic, losing by a 1–4 scoreline to finish second in the tournament.

After qualifying for the second week of the 2020 season, ATL Academy announced that they would withdraw from Contenders and go on an indefinite hiatus.

== Seasons overview ==
Year	Season	Region	OWC regular season				Regional playoffs	Interregional events
Year	Season	Region	Finish (Note: Placements in 2019 reflect standings in the team's respective group and not the entire region.)	Wins	Losses	Win %	Regional playoffs	Interregional events
Last Night's Leftovers
2018	1	North America	6th	1	4	.200		
2018	2	North America	3rd	3	2	.600	Quarterfinals	None held
ATL Academy
2018	3	North America	2nd	4	1	.800	Runners-up	None held
2019	1	North America West	3rd	5	2	.667	Runners-up	Atlantic Showdown – Lower Round 2
2019	2	North America East	1st	7	0	1.000	Winners	The Gauntlet – Runners-up
2020	1	North America	DNF (Note: ATL Academy withdrew from Contenders after the first week.)	0	1	.000		
Regular season record				20	8	.714		
Playoff record				6	3	.667		

== OWL buyouts and promotions ==
All Overwatch Contenders players are eligible to be promoted by their affiliated Overwatch League team or signed to any other Overwatch League during specified non-blackout periods.

=== 2018 ===
- DPS Ilya "NLaaeR" Koppalov was promoted to Atlanta Reign on October 29.

=== 2019 ===
- Support Dusttin "Dogman" Bowerman was promoted to Atlanta Reign on February 11.
- Tank Xander "Hawk" Domecq was promoted to Atlanta Reign on October 31.
