= XQc =

Canadian streamer (born 1995)

xQc
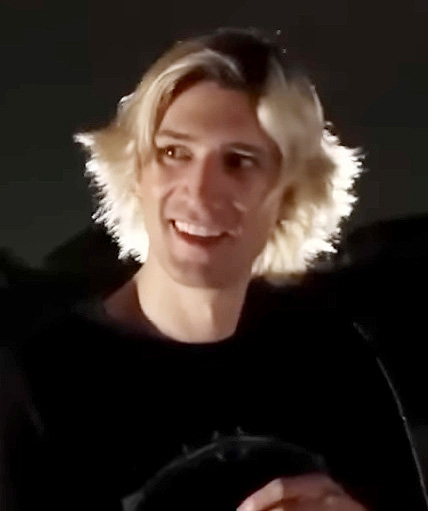
- Lengyel in 2023
- Born: Félix Lengyel; November 12, 1995 (age 31); Laval, Quebec, Canada
- Occupations: Streamer, influencer

Kick information
- Channel: xQc
- Years active: 2023–present
- Followers: 1.1 million

Twitch information
- Channel: xQc
- Years active: 2014–present
- Followers: 12.6 million

YouTube information
- Channel: xQc
- Years active: 2015–present
- Subscribers: 2.51 million
- Views: 1.94 billion

Esports career information
- Game: Overwatch
- Playing career: 2016–2019
- Role: Tank

Career highlights and awards
- OWWC Most Valuable Player (2017)
- Last updated: August 2, 2026
- Website: xQc Store

Félix Lengyel (French pronunciation: [feliks lɑ̃ʒɛl]; (Note: The original Hungarian pronunciation of Lengyel is [ˈlɛɲɟɛl].) born November 12, 1995), better known as xQc (formerly xQcOW), is a Canadian online streamer, influencer, Youtuber, and former professional Overwatch player.

While he is best known for his streaming career, Lengyel initially gained recognition as a professional Overwatch player. His esports career began in 2016, during which he also started streaming regularly. He joined Dallas Fuel, a team competing in the inaugural season of the Overwatch League, in late 2017. However, his time with Dallas Fuel was marred by controversy, resulting in repeated suspensions and ultimately his release from the team midway through the season. Lengyel represented Team Canada in the Overwatch World Cup from 2017 to 2019.

Following his departure from competitive Overwatch, Lengyel shifted his focus to a full-time streaming career on Twitch. During this period, he signed with several esports organizations, such as Sentinels and Luminosity Gaming, as a content creator. Throughout his streaming career, Lengyel has faced several bans and suspensions on Twitch for violating platform guidelines. These incidents involved showing explicit content, making offensive remarks, and engaging in stream sniping.

Despite these controversies, Lengyel maintained a large and dedicated fanbase, consistently attracting high viewership numbers. He was the most-watched streamer on Twitch for three consecutive years, from 2020 to 2022. In June 2023, Lengyel signed a two-year, non-exclusive $100 million deal to stream on Kick.

== Career ==
=== Early streaming ===
After finishing high school, Lengyel enrolled in a CEGEP, studying business administration until dropping out in his second year after feeling "directionless". At the age of 19, Lengyel subsequently began streaming on the platform Twitch, where he initially played League of Legends (LoL) under the pseudonym xQcLoL. The name xQc was derived from the last letter of his first name, x, combined with the abbreviation for his home province of Quebec, Canada; QC. As his streaming career progressed, Lengyel gained recognition and prominence primarily through his involvement with Overwatch, a video game developed by Blizzard Entertainment. Consequently, he adjusted his alias to xQcOW to reflect his association with Overwatch (OW).

=== Esports ===
Lengyel embarked on his professional esports career in Overwatch by initially competing in smaller online tournaments as a tank player for teams such as DatZit Gaming. In October 2016, he was recruited by Denial Esports, a prominent multi-game esports organization. However, after a brief period, Denial disbanded, leading Lengyel and his former teammates to form an independent roster called Yikes, which later underwent a name change to Arc 6.

During their tenure, the team participated in Season Zero of Overwatch Contenders, where Lengyel's competitive drive appeared to reach unhealthy levels. He acknowledged prioritizing gaming over fundamental aspects of life, such as sleep, nutrition, and personal relationships, and he would dedicate all of his time to playing ranked matches to regain confidence following subpar performances.

Lengyel also had the opportunity to represent Team Canada in the 2017 Overwatch World Cup. The team reached the tournament finals before ultimately being defeated by the reigning champions, South Korea. Despite the loss, Lengyel was named the event's most valuable player.

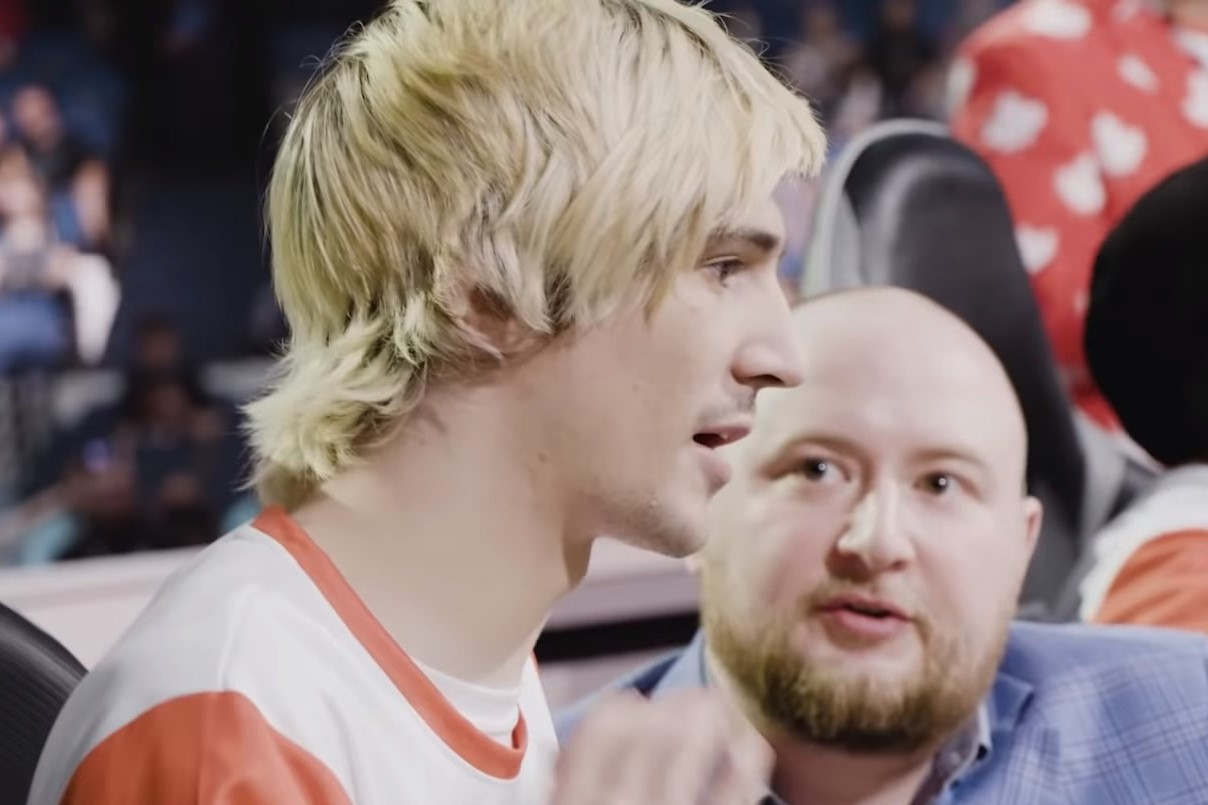
Lengyel (left) at the 2018 Overwatch World Cup

In October 2017, Lengyel joined Dallas Fuel, one of the teams competing in the inaugural season of the Overwatch League (OWL). However, before the start of the season, he faced two suspensions on his personal Overwatch account from Blizzard. The first suspension was a 72-hour penalty in November for misusing the game's reporting system. The second suspension, a seven-day penalty in December, was a result of him throwing games on stream. Lengyel's debut in the Overwatch League occurred during the Fuel's first match of the season on January 10, 2018. The team suffered a 1–2 loss to the Seoul Dynasty.

Following the Fuel's third match, a 0–4 defeat against the Houston Outlaws on January 18, Lengyel made homophobic remarks directed at Austin "Muma" Wilmot, a player from the Outlaws who is openly gay, during his personal Twitch stream. Lengyel later issued an apology to Muma on Twitter, expressing that his comments were not intended to be malicious and that he had spoken hastily. In response to the incident, the Fuel decided to bench Lengyel for the subsequent match on January 19. The Overwatch League fined him $2,000 and suspended him for four matches. The Fuel then extended the suspension through February 10.

Lengyel made his return to the Overwatch League on February 23 in a 3–1 victory over the Los Angeles Gladiators. However, his comeback was short-lived. On March 10, he received a fine of $4,000 and another four-match suspension from the league. The disciplinary action was taken due to his usage of an emote in a "racially disparaging manner" during an Overwatch League stream and on his personal social media accounts. Additionally, Lengyel had used "disparaging language" against Overwatch League broadcasters and players on his social media and personal stream. The following day, Lengyel was released from the Dallas Fuel team. In an interview with The Washington Post, he expressed that there were no racial undertones intended with his use of the emote. While Lengyel did not feel that he had made a mistake, he expressed regret for how his actions were misconstrued. He also admitted uncertainty about whether pursuing a professional career in Overwatch was the right path for him.

Lengyel's involvement in the Overwatch scene continued as he joined various teams over the years. He became a part of the Overwatch Contenders teams GOATS and Gladiators Legion. Additionally, he represented Team Canada in the 2018 and 2019 Overwatch World Cups.

=== Return to full-time streaming ===
After his departure from Dallas Fuel in 2018, Lengyel shifted his focus primarily towards his streaming career. In February 2019, he joined esports organization Sentinels as a content creator. By May 2019, Lengyel had gained significant success as one of the most prominent variety streamers on Twitch. However, Lengyel also faced some controversies during his streaming career. In July 2019, he received a three-day ban from Twitch for streaming a video that contained brief explicit content, specifically showing a penis. Although a Twitch employee had reportedly permitted the video, the ban was enforced. However, Lengyel's ban was lifted after just one day.

Despite these incidents, Lengyel achieved notable milestones on Twitch. In December 2019, he emerged as Twitch's most watched streamer, accumulating nearly eight million hours of watch time, surpassing other popular channels by a significant margin. Overall, he ranked as the sixth-most watched streamer of the year, accumulating nearly 54 million hours of watch time, with over 14% coming from December alone.

In 2020, Lengyel faced a series of bans and controversies during his streaming career. On February 29, he received a three-day ban from Twitch for streaming explicit content in the game Strip 4: Classmate Study. Lengyel entered a code that uncensored nudity in the game, leading to a brief exposure of the female character's breasts. Twitch upheld the ban even after his appeal, and the game gained attention, reaching the top of Steam's "new and trending" list.

In March 2020, Lengyel started playing chess on his stream. In April, he received mentoring from chess grandmaster Hikaru Nakamura. Twitch and Chess.com collaborated to organize the inaugural PogChamps, a chess tournament that took place from June 5 to 19. Lengyel participated in the tournament, and in a match against Charlie "MoistCr1TiKaL" White, he was defeated in just six moves. The match became the most-watched video on Chess.com's YouTube channel, garnering over ten million views by May 2021. In the PogChamps tournament, Lengyel reached the consolation bracket semifinals but ultimately lost to Ludwig Ahgren. During PogChamps, on June 12, 2020, Lengyel received a 24-hour Twitch ban after accidentally opening a video of gorillas engaging in sexual activity, which was submitted by one of his viewers. Sentinels decided to part ways with him on August 27, 2020, after his request for release. He then joined Luminosity Gaming on October 1, 2020. Lengyel faced another suspension from Twitch on November 18, 2020, when he and his team stream sniped an opposing team during a Twitch Rivals event for Fall Guys. This marked his fourth suspension from Twitch, resulting in a seven-day ban. He was also banned from Twitch Rivals for six months and had to forfeit his prize winnings from the event. Despite the bans and controversies, Lengyel achieved remarkable Twitch viewership in 2020. He accumulated the highest watch hours at over 174 million, surpassing all other channels by nearly 50 million watch hours.

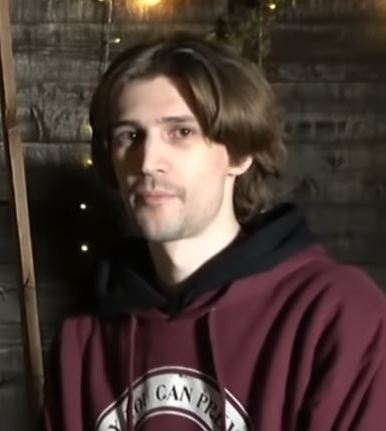
Lengyel in 2021

By mid-2021, Lengyel continued to dominate Twitch viewership, with 163 million hours watched that year, nearly double that of the second-largest channel. In June 2021, Lengyel made the decision to move back to Canada after experiencing multiple instances of swatting, a dangerous prank targeting streamers. He expressed genuine fear for his safety and cited concerns about his well-being.

In October 2021, a leak exposed the earnings of top Twitch streamers, including Lengyel. The leak revealed that he was the highest-paid individual streamer, earning over $8 million since 2019. While the accuracy of the leak was questioned, Lengyel confirmed that his reported earnings were correct. Lengyel maintained his position as the most-watched streamer on Twitch in 2021, accumulating 274 million hours watched. His peak viewership reached 173,000 viewers, although it fell short compared to the channel with the highest peak, which garnered 2.5 million viewers.

In April 2022, Lengyel participated in the r/place social experiment on Reddit, an online canvas in which registered users could edit by changing the colour of a single pixel. During the event, he targeted a My Little Pony art piece, which resulted in an influx of death threats. Lengyel said that he received more death threats in just one hour during that month than he had throughout his previous six years of streaming combined. Despite the negativity, he broke his Twitch viewership record, peaking at over 293,000 viewers during the event. Later that month, he surpassed that record while streaming a beta build of Overwatch 2, reaching a peak of over 312,000 viewers. He continued to lead all Twitch streamers in terms of hours watched for the year 2022.

In January 2023, Lengyel announced his departure from Luminosity Gaming. In June 2023, Lengyel signed a deal with the streaming platform Kick. The deal was valued at $70 million over two years, established a non-exclusive partnership between Lengyel and Kick. The agreement included the potential for performance-based bonuses, totaling approximately $30 million. The deal was noted as potentially one of the largest in entertainment history. Lengyel finished 2023 as Twitch's fourth-most watched streamer with a total of 89 million hours watched on the platform.

In October 2024, Forbes ranked the influencer 28th in their Top Creators 2024 list.

== Personal life ==
Lengyel was born on November 12, 1995, in Laval, Quebec, Canada. He is of Hungarian descent.

From 2017 to 2022, Lengyel was in a relationship with fellow streamer Samantha Lopez, known by her Twitch username adeptthebest. Later, Samantha filed for divorce, claiming they were married under common law marriage, while Lengyel denied this claim. In August 2023, she also filed an assault case against Lengyel. In December 2023, he announced on his stream that he won both cases.

In October 2024, it was reported that Samantha filed the case against him again, this time in the state of California.

On August 5, 2024, Lengyel accompanied online streamer Adin Ross during a meeting with then-former president of the United States Donald Trump.

== Awards and nominations ==
Year	Ceremony	Category	Result	Ref.
2017	2017 Overwatch World Cup	Most Valuable Player	Won	
2018	2018 Esports Awards	Streamer of the Year	Nominated	
2020	Canadian Game Awards	Best Streamer	Nominated	
2020	2020 Esports Awards	Streamer of the Year	Nominated	
2021	2021 Esports Awards	Streamer of the Year	Nominated	
2021	The Streamer Awards	Best GTA Role-play Streamer	Nominated	
2021	The Streamer Awards	Streamer of the Year	Nominated	
2022	Canadian Game Awards	Best Streamer	Nominated	
2022	12th Streamy Awards	Streamer of the Year	Nominated	
2022	12th Streamy Awards	Just Chatting	Won	
2022	The Streamer Awards	Best Variety Streamer	Won	
2022	The Streamer Awards	Streamer of the Year	Nominated	
2023	13th Streamy Awards	Streamer of the Year	Nominated	
2023	13th Streamy Awards	Just Chatting	Nominated	
2023	The Streamer Awards	Best Variety Streamer	Nominated	
2025	Esports Decade Awards	Streamer of the Decade	Won	
2025	2025 Esports Awards	Streamer of the Year	Nominated	
2025	The Streamer Awards	Best Just Chatting Streamer	Nominated	

== See also ==
- List of most-followed Twitch channels
