= Gladiators Legion =

- Founded: 2018
- League: Overwatch Contenders
- Division: Atlantic
- Region: North America East
- Team history: Gladiators Legion; 2018–present
- Based in: Los Angeles, California
- Colors: Purple, white, black
- Owner: Josh Kroenke; Stan Kroenke
- Affiliation: Los Angeles Gladiators

Gladiators Legion is an American esports team for the video game Overwatch competing in Overwatch Contenders (OWC) and an academy team for the Los Angeles Gladiators of the Overwatch League (OWL). The team is owned by Stan Kroenke and Josh Kroenke of Kroenke Sports & Entertainment, based in Los Angeles, California, and plays in the North American East region of OWC. In December 2019, the team announced that they would not be competing in the 2020 season of Contenders.

== Franchise history ==
On February 15, 2018, the Los Angeles Gladiators formally announced their academy team would go under the name "Gladiators Legion" for Overwatch Contenders North America and revealed their 6-player 2018 Season 1 roster, led by head coach Gannon "RaptorZ" Nelson.

In their first season of play, Legion posted a 4–1 record in the group stages, but fell to the Houston Outlaws' academy team OpTic Academy in the quarterfinals of the playoffs. The following season, the team, again, qualified for the playoffs but lost to San Francisco Shock's academy team NRG Esports in the quarterfinals. Gladiators Legion did not qualify for the 2018 Season 3 playoffs.

Prior to 2019 Season 1, the team announced popular Twitch streamer and former OWL player Félix "xQc" Lengyel was signed to the team as a substitute main tank. Additionally, Thomas "maid" Mok was signed as the team's new head coach. Gladiators Legion posted a 3–4 record for the group stages of the season, and qualified for the playoffs. The team defeated Chicken Contendies in the quarterfinals, defeated Mayhem Academy in the semifinals, and faced Philadelphia Fusion's academy team Fusion University in the finals; Gladiators lost the match by a score of 1–4. Following the regional finals, the team fell to ATL Academy in a qualifier match for the Atlantic Showdown, an interregional double-elimination tournament. In 2019 Season 2, the Legion started the season with a 2–0 record, but it was followed by five consecutive losses to give the team a 2–5 record for the regular season. However, due to a map differential tiebreaker, the Legion qualified for the NA East playoffs as the final seed. The team won their quarterfinal and semifinal match, but they fell to ATL Academy in the finals match. Finishing in 4th place in the region, the team qualified for The Gauntlet, an interregional tournament. While they were able to make it past the group stages, the team fell in a sweep to Talon Esports in their first match of the knockout stage, eliminating them from the tournament.

On December 5, 2019, the team announced that they would not be competing in the 2020 season of Contenders, making them the fourth academy team to drop out of the league in 2019.

== Seasons overview ==
Year	Season	Region	OWC regular season				Regional playoffs	Interregional events
Year	Season	Region	Finish (Note: Placements prior to 2019 reflect standings in the team's respective group and not the entire region.)	Wins	Losses	Win %	Regional playoffs	Interregional events
Gladiators Legion
2018	1	North America	2nd	4	1	.800	Quarterfinals	
2018	2	North America	2nd	3	2	.600	Quarterfinals	None held
2018	3	North America	5th	2	3	.400		None held
2019	1	North America East	4th	3	4	.429	Runners-up	
2019	2	North America East	6th	2	5	.286	Runners-up	The Gauntlet – Lower Round 1
Regular season record				14	15	.483		
Playoff record				4	4	.500		

== OWL buyouts and promotions ==
All Overwatch Contenders players are eligible to be promoted by their affiliated Overwatch League team or signed to any other Overwatch League during specified non-blackout periods.

=== 2018 ===
- DPS Jeffrey "blasé" Tsang was signed by Boston Uprising on October 22.
- Tank Lee "Panker" Byung-ho was promoted to Los Angeles Gladiators on December 10 while still remaining a member of Gladiators Legion on a two-way contract.

=== 2019 ===
- Tank Nathan "frd" Goebel was signed to Atlanta Reign on April 3.
- Tank Seo "Stand1" Ji-won was signed to the Shanghai Dragons on November 25.
