= Overwatch Contenders =

Overwatch esports league

- Game: Overwatch
- Founded: 2017
- Folded: 2024
- Owner: Blizzard Entertainment
- Related competitions: Overwatch League; Overwatch Open Division
- Website: overwatchcontenders.com

Overwatch Contenders (OWC) was an international esports league for the video game Overwatch organized by Blizzard Entertainment. The series acts as the development league for aspiring Overwatch League (OWL) professionals. Founded in 2017, Contenders was created in part to consolidate existing regional tournaments into a structure to support the Overwatch League, including the Overwatch Apex tournament, Overwatch Premier Series, and Overwatch Pacific Championship.

Overwatch Contenders ceased operations in 2024, coinciding with the end of the Overwatch League.

== History ==
The Contenders league was launched in 2017 to be a developmental league for players aspiring to play in the Overwatch League, with regions in North America and Europe. Teams competed in an online open qualifier known as 2017 Season Zero, where the top eight teams from Europe, the top six teams from North America, and invited teams Team Envy and Rogue would compete in 2017 Season 1.

In 2018, Blizzard merged Contenders with existing regional tournaments into a structure to support the Overwatch League; it was divided into five divisions with 12 teams each: Korea (replacing the Overwatch Apex tournament), China (replacing the Overwatch Premier Series), and Pacific (replacing Overwatch Pacific Championship for other Asian-Pacific countries), and adding in North America and European divisions. Prior to the second 2018 Contenders season, Blizzard added two additional divisions, Australia and South America, bringing the total to seven. Further, Blizzard gave the opportunity to the top eight teams from the Open Division within each region to compete in Contenders Trials, which would be held at the end of each Contenders season; the qualified teams would take place in a promotion-relegation tournament for the chance to compete in the next Contenders season.

For its second year in 2019, Blizzard adjusted the format by reducing the number of teams in each region to eight, while dividing the North American region into East and West divisions. Blizzard also added a regional limit of the number of "import players", which are those that live outside the division's region, to a maximum of three.

Blizzard made several changes for Contenders for the 2020 year after the rise of the COVID-19 pandemic. The North America East and West regions were merged back into the single North America region, reducing the total amount of regions back to seven, and the Atlantic and Pacific Divisions were renamed to the Atlantic and Pacific Conferences. Aside from China, the regional player restrictions was also reverted, now allowing any number of players from any region to be on a team in any region. The number of two-way players allowed to compete on a given day for a team was increased from two to four. Blizzard also made a major format change for 2020 year. The qualification to make regional playoffs was changed from a round-robin format to a point system, which includes four Contenders tournaments that will dictate the number of points a team earns based on their finishing place. After the first half of the 2020 season, Overwatch Contenders adjusted the structure of each region, with South Korea and Australia reverting back to the standard "league" format used in previous seasons, North America and Europe shifting to monthly tournaments, South America shifting to a hybrid format between the two, and China making no changes. Additionally, the Pacific region of Contenders was cancelled; Blizzard committed US$100,000 to "exploring ways to build a unique experience for Pacific players" in the region. In February 2021, South America Contenders was cancelled, leaving only five regions. Teams in South America, as well as the previously cancelled Pacific, would be able to qualify for international Contenders tournaments via third-party tournaments in their respective regions.

For the 2022 year, Overwatch Contenders, along with the Overwatch League, will be played on a beta build of Overwatch 2. It will also shift to an open-registration format, with the top teams from the 2021 season being directly invited to the first event of the year without needing to qualify.

On January 23, 2024, Blizzard announced that the Overwatch League and Contenders had officially folded; on the same day, they would announce a multi-year deal with ESL FACEIT Group and WDG Esports to create the Overwatch Champions Series (OWCS) to replace the OWL.

== Structure and seasons ==
Promotion and relegation flow chart of an Overwatch Contenders season: Contenders Playoffs Contenders Contenders Trials Open Division T Top B Bottom

The league was divided into two conferences, the Atlantic Conference and the Pacific Conferences. Each division was divided into a total of seven regions; the Pacific Division consists of the Australia, China, Korea, and Pacific regions, and the Atlantic Division consists of the Europe, North America, and South America regions.

Each region was broken down into three divisions:

- Open Division: a six-week Swiss-system tournament open to any player of any skill level. The Swiss culminates with a one-week, single-elimination tournament.
- Contenders Trials (or simply Trials): a one-week, twelve-team, single-elimination tournament.
- Contenders: a twelve-team, single-elimination tournament.

Additionally, each region's promotion and relegation into several phases:

1. Open Division: The top eight teams advance to Trials Week 1.
2. Trials Week 1: The top eight teams from advance to Contenders Week 1, while the bottom four move to Trials Week 2.
3. Contenders Week 1: The top four teams move to Contenders Week 2, while the bottom eight drop into Trials Week 2.
4. Trials Week 2: The top eight teams advance to Contenders Week 2, while the bottom four drop into Open Division.
5. Contenders Week 2: The top four teams move to Contenders Week 3, while the bottom eight drop into Trials Week 3.
6. Open Division: The top four teams advance to Trials Week 3.
7. Trials Week 3: The top eight teams advance to Contenders Week 3, while the bottom four move to Trials Week 4.
8. Contenders Week 3: The top four teams move to Contenders Week 4, while the bottom eight drop into Trials Week 4.
9. Trials Week 4: The top eight teams advance to Contenders Week 4.
10. Contenders Week 4.

Points are awarded only in Contenders and are based on placements in the tournament. First place was awarded 100 points, second was awarded 50 points, third and fourth are awarded 25 points, fifth through eighth are awarded 20 points, and ninth through twelfth are awarded 10 points.

=== Championship and interregional play ===
Each region's playoffs, known as the Contenders Playoffs, was a double-elimination tournament. The top eight teams, based on points, from each region will qualify for their region's playoffs. Each playoff match winner was determined by which team win three maps first until the Grand Finals, which was first-to-four. The top four teams from Playoffs move on to the next season's Contenders Week 1, while the bottom four teams drop to the next season's Trials Week 1. Additionally, the top performers in each regional playoff had the chance to qualify for international events.

Since 2019, the top teams from the Pacific and Atlantic Conference in each year's first season have competed in double-elimination tournaments, called the Pacific Showdown and Atlantic Showdown, respectively. Similarly, at the end of each year's second season, the top teams from the every region compete in The Gauntlet, which consists of group stages culminating in a double-elimination tournament.

== Academy teams ==
Ownership models vary across Overwatch Contenders. Any team that moves from the Open Division to Contenders Trials must have a proper team owner; that is, the owner must not be player or by an individual acting as a proxy for a player. Contenders teams may be affiliated with an OWL team, known as an "academy team", and players can be freely moved between these affiliated teams during set periods of each OWL season. As such, there are three main models for ownership of a Contenders team: OWL affiliates, third-party sponsored teams, and unsigned rosters.

=== Current ===
Academy team	OWL team	Region	Years active	Relationship	Ref
Bilibili Gaming	Hangzhou Spark	China	2019–present	Ownership	
Gen.G esports	Seoul Dynasty	Korea	2018–present	Ownership	
Ultra Prime Academy	Guangzhou Charge	China	2020–present	Ownership	
T1	Seoul Infernal	Korea	2019–present	Partnership	
Team Chaser	Chengdu Hunters	China	2020–present	Ownership	
Team CC	Shanghai Dragons	China	2018–present	Ownership	
Uprising Academy	Boston Uprising	Korea (Note: Previously North America)	2019–present	Ownership	

=== Former ===
Academy team	OWL team	Region	Years active	Relationship	Ref
ATL Academy	Atlanta Reign	North America	2019–2020	Ownership	
British Hurricane	London Spitfire	Europe	2018–present	Ownership	
Eternal Academy	Paris Eternal	Europe	2019, 2020	Ownership	
GG Esports Academy	Houston Outlaws	North America	2018	Ownership	
Gladiators Legion	Los Angeles Gladiators	North America	2018–2019	Ownership	
LGE.Huya (Note: Ended partnership with OWL team but did not disband)	Chengdu Hunters	China	2019–2020	Partnership	
Mayhem Academy	Florida Mayhem	North America	2018–2019	Ownership	
Montreal Rebellion	Toronto Defiant	North America	2019–2020	Ownership	
NRG Esports	San Francisco Shock	North America	2018–2019	Ownership	
T1w.GZA	Guangzhou Charge	China	2019–2020	Partnership	
Team Envy	Dallas Fuel	North America	2018–2020	Ownership	
XL2 Academy	New York Excelsior	North America	2018–2019	Ownership	

== Player allocations ==
While there was no limit to how many players may be signed to a team, all Contenders teams could have only eight players designated as eligible to compete in a given week. The minimum age to play in Contenders was 13, except in the China region, where the minimum age was 16.

=== Two-way contracts ===
In 2018, the Overwatch League allowed OWL teams to sign up to four players to two-way contracts with their associated academy team. A maximum of four of the two-way players could play in a single Contenders match, and a two-way player could not play in a Contenders match and Overwatch League match in the same week. These players would spend the majority of their time on a team's Contenders roster, but could freely move to their respective OWL team for up to two matches in any stage of regular season. Players under two-way contracts counted against both the OWL team's roster limit and OWC team's roster limit. In addition, two-way players had to be paid the same minimum salary ($50,000 as of 2018) and benefits as any other Overwatch League player. In August 2020, the OWL removed the limit on the number of players that a team could have on a two-way contract.

=== Buyouts ===
Any Overwatch League team may contact, tryout, and sign any player competing in Contenders during specified periods, but must give a one-day notice to the player's current team before doing so. Should the OWL team decide to sign a Contenders player, the OWL team may have to pay a one-time buyout fee to the Contenders team, which was up to 100% of the players annual base salary. Contenders teams and their affiliate OWL team have "right-to-match" clauses, which will allow the parent team to match any other OWL offer within seven days of the offer being made.

== Past seasons ==
=== Regional champions ===
Year	Season	Pacific				Atlantic				
Year	Season	Australia	China	Korea	Pacific	Europe		North America		South America
2017	0	–	–	–	–	eUnited		Immortals		–
2017	1	–	–	–	–	Team Gigantti		Team EnVyUs		–
2018	1	Sydney Drop Bears	Lucky Future Zenith	X6-Gaming	DeToNator.KOREA	British Hurricane		Fusion University		Brasil Gaming House
2018	2	Sydney Drop Bears	Lucky Future Zenith	RunAway	Talon Esports	Eagle Gaming		Fusion University		Brasil Gaming House
2018	3	Sydney Drop Bears	The One Winner	RunAway	Hong Kong Attitude	Team Gigantti		Fusion University		LFTOWL
2019	1	ORDER	LGE.Huya	Element Mystic	Talon Esports	Angry Titans		Fusion University (Note: North America East winner.)	Team Envy (Note: North America West winner.)	Lowkey Esports
2019	2	ORDER	LGE.Huya	RunAway	Talon Esports	HSL Esports		ATL Academy	Team Envy	Lowkey Esports
2020	1	Mindfreak	Team CC	O2 Blast	Talon Esports	British Hurricane		Team Doge		Dignity
2020	2	Ground Zero Gaming	Flag Gaming	WGS Phoenix	None held	None held		None held		Majestados
2021	1	Dire Wolves	Team Chaser	O2 Blast	–	British Hurricane (Note: March winner.)	New Kings (Note: April winner.)	Revival	American Tornado	–
2021	2	Dire Wolves	Team Chaser	O2 Blast	–	British Hurricane (Note: June winner.)	Falcons Esport EU (Note: July winner.)	American Tornado	American Tornado	–
2021	3	None held	None held	None held	–	Falcons Esport EU (Note: September winner.)	Falcons Esport EU (Note: October winner.)	Redbird Esports	Redbird Esports	–

=== Interregional champions ===
Year	Season	Event	Location	Champions	Score	Runners-up	Prize pool
2018	1	Atlantic Showdown	Alwernia, Poland	British Hurricane	3–1	Fusion University	$0
2019	1	Pacific Showdown	Shanghai, China	Element Mystic	4–2	O2 Blast	$125,000
2019	1	Atlantic Showdown	Krefeld, Germany	Fusion University	4–0	Team Envy	$125,000
2019	2	The Gauntlet	Seoul, Korea	Element Mystic	4–1	ATL Academy	$250,000
2020	2	The Gauntlet	Online	Team CC	4–1	Gen.G	$150,000
2020	2	The Gauntlet	Online	British Hurricane	4–0	Obey Alliance	$100,000
2020	2	The Gauntlet	Online	American Tornado	4–0	Odyssey	$100,000
2020	2	The Gauntlet	Online	War Pigs	4–2	Majestados	$75,000
