= Fusion University =

American esports team

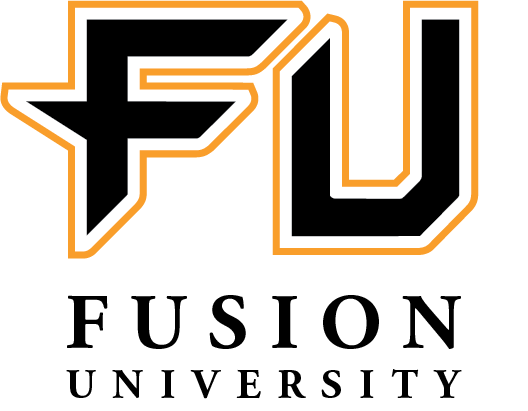
- Founded: 2018
- Disbanded: 2021
- League: Overwatch Contenders
- Conference: Atlantic
- Region: Europe
- Team history: Fusion University; 2018–present
- Colors: Orange, black, white
- Owner: Comcast Spectacor
- Affiliation: Philadelphia Fusion
- Regional titles: 4; 2018 Season 1; 2018 Season 2; 2018 Season 3; 2019 Season 1
- Interregional titles: 1; 2019 Atlantic Showdown

Fusion University (FU) was an American esports team for the video game Overwatch competing in Overwatch Contenders (OWC) and an academy team for the Philadelphia Fusion of the Overwatch League (OWL). The team is based in Philadelphia, Pennsylvania and plays in the Europe region of OWC. Fusion has won four consecutive North America Contenders titles and most recently won the 2019 Atlantic Showdown. The team began competition in the North America region of OWC and moved to the Korea division in 2019. Prior to the 2020 season, Fusion University disbanded. They returned to competition for the Europe 2021 season.

== Franchise history ==
On January 29, 2018, the Philadelphia Fusion formally announced their academy team would be named Fusion University and begin competition in the North American region of Overwatch Contenders.

In their first season of play, FU posted a perfect 5–0 record en route to qualify for the playoffs, where they capped off the season with victory over Toronto Esports to claim the 2018 Season 1 North America title. Following the win, the team fell to the Contenders Europe Champions British Hurricane in the 2018 Atlantic Showdown by a score of 1–3. The following season, Fusion University again posted perfect a 5–0 record in the group stages and defeated XL2 Academy in the 2018 Season 2 North America Grand Finals to win back-to-back regional titles. For the third season of 2018, the team, again, did not drop a match and defeated ATL Academy in the North America Grand Finals, taking home their third regional title in three seasons.

Fusion competed in the North America East region for season one of 2019. Going into their last match of the group stages, FU had a 6–0 record and was set to face Mayhem Academy; Mayhem won the match 3–1, snapping Fusion's 30-game win streak. As the second seed, the team had a first-round bye for the first week of the playoffs, and went on to defeat Gladiators Legion in the finals to claim their fourth consecutive North America Contenders title. As the North America champions, Fusion qualified for the 2019 Atlantic Showdown, an interregional double-elimination tournament. The team did not lose a single match, and dropped only one map throughout its entirety, to claim the title of Atlantic Contenders Champions.

After winning the first Atlantic Showdown, Fusion University announced that they would be moving from the North American division to compete in Korean Trials; the move was reportedly made to abide by the new region lock rules, which were implemented in 2019 Season 1, though FU was given a season-long grace period. The team qualified for Korea Contenders, but they struggled in the group stages, posting a meager 3–4 record. FU qualified for the Korea regional playoffs, but they fell in the quarterfinals to RunAway.

In December 2019, T1, who is also owned by Comcast Spectacor, became the Philadelphia Fusion's academy team and took Fusion University's spot in Contenders Korea.

In May 2021, Fusion University announced that it was returning to Overwatch Contenders as the second academy team for the Philadelphia Fusion. The team competed in the Europe division during the June 2021 tournament, placing 4th in the tournament after losing to British Hurricane 3–1 on June 17. The team disbanded after the tournament ended.

== Seasons overview ==
Year	Season	Region	OWC regular season				Regional playoffs	Interregional events
Year	Season	Region	Finish	Wins	Losses	Win %	Regional playoffs	Interregional events
Fusion University
2018	1	North America	1st	5	0	1.000	Winners	Atlantic Showdown – Runners-up
2018	2	North America	1st	5	0	1.000	Winners	None held
2018	3	North America	1st	5	0	1.000	Winners	None held
2019	1	North America East	2nd	6	1	.857	Winners	Atlantic Showdown – Winners
2019	2	Korea	5th	3	4	.429	Quarterfinals	The Gauntlet – Did not qualify

== OWL buyouts and promotions ==
All Overwatch Contenders players are eligible to be promoted by their affiliated Overwatch League team or signed to any other Overwatch League during specified non-blackout periods.

=== 2018 ===
- Support Elijah "Elk" Gallagher was promoted to Philadelphia Fusion on September 25 while still remaining a member of Fusion University on a two-way contract.
- DPS Zachary "ZachaREEE" Lombardo was signed by Dallas Fuel on December 3.

=== 2019 ===
- Support Kim "Alarm" Kyeong-bo was promoted to the Philadelphia Fusion on October 30.
- Tank Shin "BERNAR" Se-won and support Kim "Fuze" Tae-hoon were traded to the London Spitfire on October 30.
- Tank Adam "Beast" Denton was signed by Toronto Defiant on October 30.
- DPS Lee "WhoRU" Seung-joon was signed to the New York Excelsior on December 4.
