= Overwatch Apex =

South Korean Overwatch tournament series

- Apex logo used for Season 4
- Game: Overwatch
- Founded: 2016
- Folded: 2017
- Replaced by: Overwatch Contenders
- Owner: OnGameNet
- No. of teams: 16
- Country: South Korea
- Venue: OGN Giga Arena
- Last champion: GC Busan
- Most titles: Lunatic Hai (2 titles)
- Relegation to: Apex Challengers
- Website: ogn.tving.com/ogn

Overwatch Apex, or simply Apex, was a competitive esports tournament series in South Korea for the video game Overwatch run by South Korean cable television channel OnGameNet (OGN) from 2016 to 2017. The tournament was contested mostly by South Korean teams, although several Western teams were invited to compete throughout most of its seasons. After four seasons, Apex was expected to continue operations as Overwatch Contenders Korea, but after Blizzard Entertainment, the owners of the Contenders, opted to use a different broadcaster for the Korean Contenders league, OGN shut down the Apex series.

== Format ==
Every season of Apex was contested by 16 teams from both Korea and invited non-Korean teams, aside from season four, which had no invited non-Korean teams. For the first season, 64 South Korean teams advanced from an online qualifier to an offline qualifiers, with the top 12 teams advancing to the main league, and the following 12 teams after that qualified for Overwatch Apex Challengers, a promotion tournament for the second season onwards. Seasons began with group stages, followed by playoffs. Each match in the season was a best-of-five series, aside from the finals, which was a best-of-seven series.

== History ==
=== Formation ===
On September 16, 2016, OnGameNet, a South Korean cable television channel that specialized in broadcasting video game-related content and esports matches, announced that it would be hosting a 16-team Overwatch league called OGN Apex. A total of 1,531 people from 230 South Korean teams signed up for the online qualifiers of first season.

=== Inaugural season ===
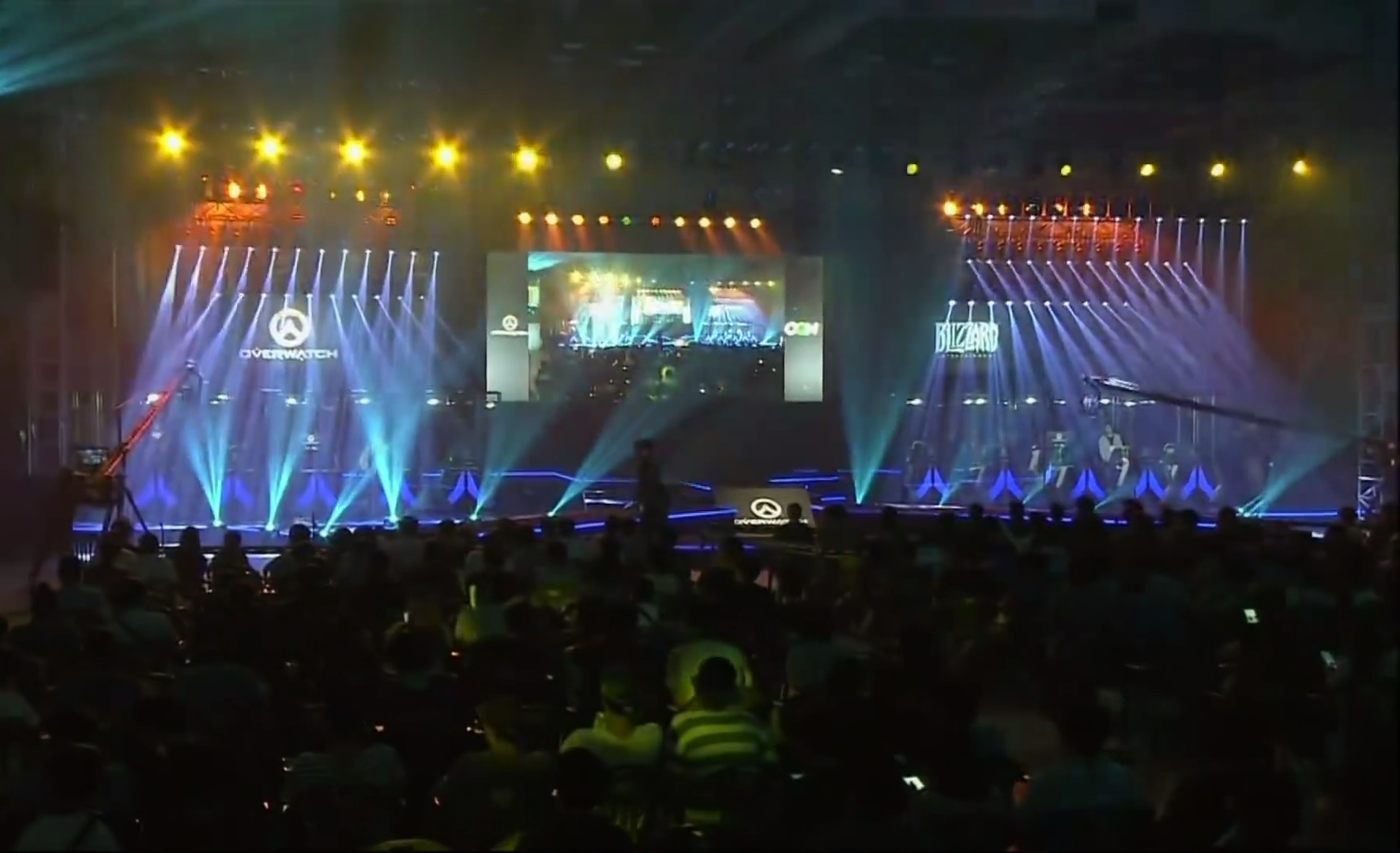
Matches were played at the OGN Giga Arena.

Twelve South Korean teams, Afreeca Freecs Blue, MVP Space, BK Stars, Luxury Watch Blue, Rhinos Gaming Titan, Flash Lux, Mighty Storm, KongDoo Panthera, Kongdoo Uncia, RunAway, CONBOX T6, and Lunatic-Hai, qualified for the main league. Additionally two North American teams, Team EnVyUs and NRG Esports, and two European teams, Rogue and Reunited, were invited to compete in season one. English broadcasts featured the casting duo Christopher "MonteCristo" Mykles and Erik "DoA" Lonnquist. The league's inaugural season began on October 7, 2016, with the group stage of the tournament. Following the group stage, an eight-team, single elimination tournament took place. The finals, which took place in Ilsan, South Korea on December 3, 2016, saw Team EnVyUs defeat Afreeca Freecs Blue, 4–1.

=== Continuation ===
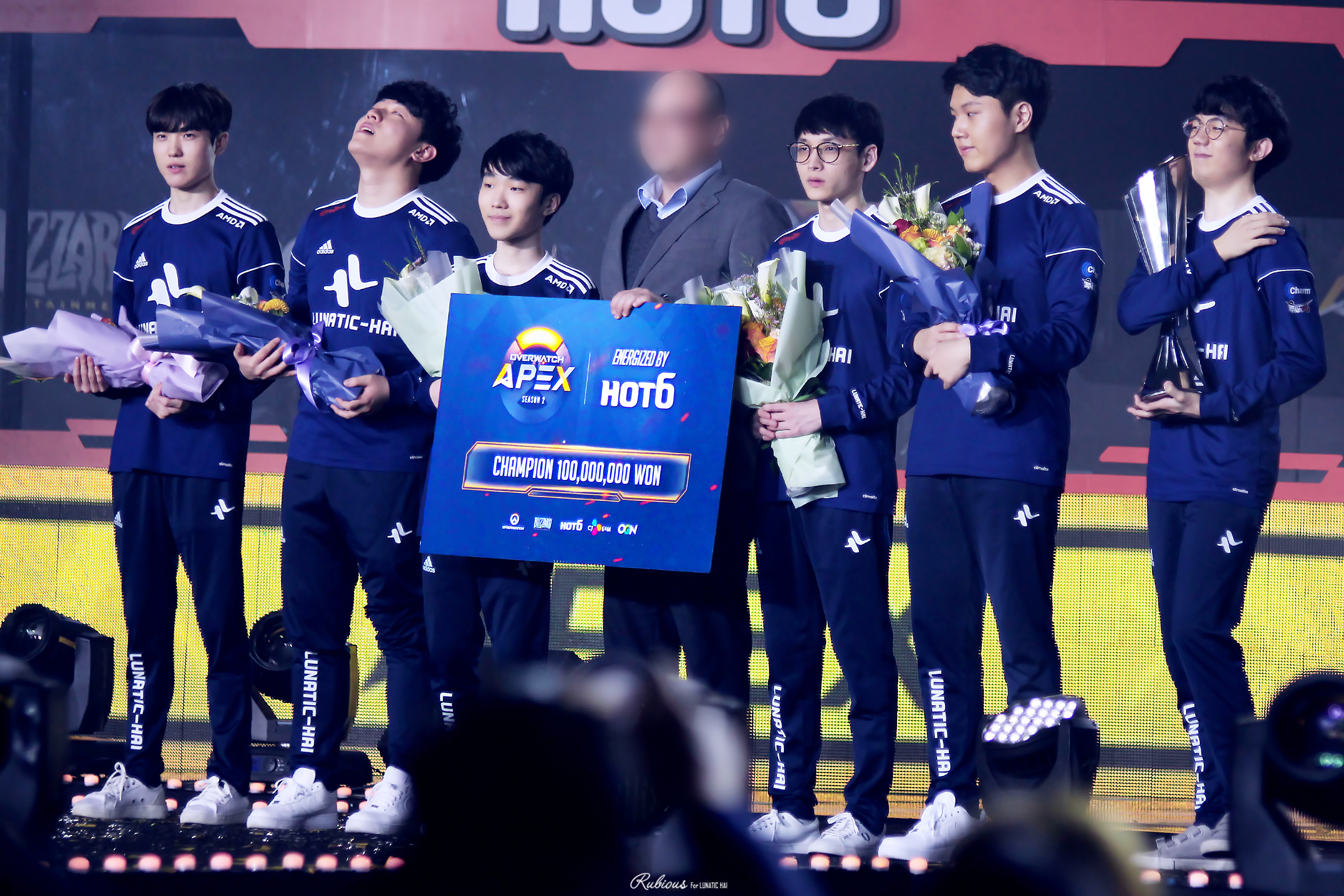
Lunatic-Hai won Apex Season 2.

Several changes were made for the second season of Apex. The league added a double-elimination bracket between the group stage and the playoffs, and the top four teams from the double-elimination bracket advanced to the playoffs. Additionally, teams were allotted one timeout in the middle of a match. The second season was contested by twelve South Korean teams, three North American teams, and one European team. Of the South Korean teams from the first season, MVP Space, Rhinos Gaming Titan, and Mighty Storm did not qualify, while MVP Infinity, Meta Athena, and Afreeca Freecs Red qualified for the group stage. The Western teams invited were Team EnVyUs, Fnatic, Cloud9, and Misfits. The season began with its first group stage on January 17, 2017, in Seoul, South Korea.

The third season followed the same format as the second, with the twelve-team group stage, eight-team double-elimination bracket, and a four-team playoff. The league introduced a new rule in which teams were allowed to substitute players between maps; with this rule change, many teams increased the number of players on their roster from six to seven or more. English casting duo Mykles and Lonnquist departed from Apex to prepare for Blizzard Entertainment's upcoming Overwatch League. The league reduced the amount of invited non-Korean teams from four to two. Returning South Korean teams from Season 2 included Lunatic-Hai, KongDoo Panthera, Afreeca Freecs Blue, RunAway, KongDoo Uncia, Luxury Watch Blue, BK Stars, and Meta Athena, while qualified teams from Challengers included Mighty AOD, X6-Gaming, CONBOX Spirit, MVP Space, Flash Lux, and Rhinos Gaming Wings. The two invited Western teams were Rogue and Team EnVyUs. Season 3 began April 28, 2017.

In May 2017, Blizzard Entertainment announced plans to launch Overwatch Contenders, a "development league" in North America and Europe. Following, OGN announced that no international teams would be invited to compete in Apex for its fourth season; instead, OGN cancelled Apex's promotion and relegation event and invited the top five teams from the Challengers league. Season 4 was contested by MVP Space, Meta Athena, KongDoo Uncia, Flash Lux, Afreeca Freecs, ROX Orcas, Meta Bellum, LW Blue, Lunatic-Hai, RunAway, KongDoo Panthera, NC Foxes, LW Red, GC Busan, X6-Gaming and CONBOX.

=== Disbandment ===
In late 2017, Blizzard Entertainment announced that Overwatch Contenders would operate in seven regions globally, and that Overwatch Apex would be re-branded as Contenders Korea. OGN had planned to run a fifth season of Apex before it was rebranded to Contenders; however, in December 2017, Korean news outlet Sports Chosun reported that Blizzard had sold the Contenders Korea broadcasting rights to television channel MBC. In January 2018, OGN announced that they would be ending the Apex tournament series and would not be a part of Contenders Korea, confirming that Blizzard had sold the broadcasting rights in an interview, stating, "We did our best and agreed to most of Blizzard's conditions on continuing the competition, but we were notified that Blizzard was preparing a competition with another broadcast. Until that notification, OGN had been preparing for the next season, so we are very regretful."

== Seasons summary ==
Season	Champions	Score	Runners-up	Third place	Score	Fourth place	Ref.
1	Team EnVyUs	4–0	Afreeca Freecs Blue	No third place match			
2	Lunatic-Hai	4–3	RunAway	LW Blue	3–1	Meta Athena	
3	Lunatic-Hai	4–3	KongDoo Panthera	Afreeca Freecs Blue	4–1	Team EnVyUs	
4	GC Busan	4–3	RunAway	Cloud9 KongDoo	4–0	Nc Foxes	

== Legacy ==
The first Overwatch Contenders Gauntlet, the premier tournament in the Contenders series, took place at the OGN Giga Arena, the venue that hosted the Apex tournament. In the Overwatch League's 2021 season, the league produced a hype video for one of their matches that was reminiscent of the videos that OGN produced for Apex.
