= 2020 Florida Mayhem season =

- Head coach: Kim "KuKi" Dae-kuk
- General manager: Albert Yeh
- Owner: Ben Spoont
- Conference: Atlantic
- Division: South
- Region: North America

Results
- Record: 14–7 (.667)
- Place: North America: 4th; League: 6th
- May Melee: Finals
- Summer Showdown: Semifinals
- Countdown Cup: Knockouts
- Season Playoffs: NA Lower Round 3
- Total Earnings: $120,000

The 2020 Florida Mayhem season was the third season of the Florida Mayhem's existence in the Overwatch League and the team's first season under head coach Kim "KuKi" Dae-kuk. The Mayhem planned to host two homestand weekends in the 2020 season at the Watsco Center at the University of Miami and the Full Sail Live Venue at Full Sail University, but all homestand matches were canceled due to the COVID-19 pandemic.

The Mayhem opened the season going 7–4 heading into the May Melee tournament, where they reached the finals before being defeated by the San Francisco Shock. Florida finished the season with 14 wins, 3 bonus wins from midseason tournaments, and 7 losses to claim the fourth seed in the North America season playoffs. A 0–3 loss to the Washington Justice on September 12 eliminated the Mayhem from the North America bracket.

== Preceding offseason ==
=== Organizational changes ===
In early October 2019, Florida released assistant general manager Scott "Bearhands" Tester and promoted assistant general manager Andrew "yeHHH" Yeh to general manager. Assistant coach Kim "KH1" Hyung-il was released from the team a few days later. On November 20, Florida announced the signing of former RunAway coach Kim "KuKi" Dae-kuk as their head coach and former MVP Space coach Kim "Dox" Min-seok as an assistant coach.

For the 2020 season, the Mayhem debuted new colors, trading the yellow and red color scheme that the team had used for two years in favor of a 1980s Miami color scheme, featuring pink, teal, and black.

=== Roster changes ===
The Mayhem enter the new season with no free agents, ten players which they have the option to retain for another year, and two players under contract. The OWL's deadline to exercise a team option is November 11, after which any players not retained will become a free agent. Free agency officially began on October 7.

On October 7, Florida announced that they would not pick up the team option for flex support Jo "HaGoPeun" Hyeon-woo, tank Yoon "Swon" Seong-won, substitute off-tank Koo "Xepher" Jae-mo, substitute support Park "RaiN" Jae-ho, and substitute DPS Choi "DPI" Yong-joon. Florida's first acquisitions of the offseason were announced on November 20, when the team announced the signings of DPS Kim "Yaki" Jun-ki and support Gang "Gangnamjin" Nam-jin from Korean Contenders team RunAway.

== Roster ==
2020 Florida Mayhem roster
Players
Coaches

Role	No.	Handle	Name	Nationality
Damage	4	Sayaplayer (I)	Ha Jeong-woo	South Korea
Damage	22	BQB	Lee Sang-bum	South Korea
Damage	7	Yaki	Kim Jun-ki	South Korea
Tank	1	Fate	Koo Pan-seung	South Korea
Tank	20	Karayan	Choi San-ha	South Korea
Tank	18	Gargoyle	Lee Beom-jun	South Korea
Support	24	Byrem	Lee Seong-ju	South Korea
Support	11	Gangnamjin	Gang Nam-jin	South Korea
Support	96	Kris	Choi Jun-doo	South Korea

Head coach

- Kim "KuKi" Dae-kuk

Legend:
- (I) Inactive
- (S) Suspended
- (2W) Two-way player
- Substitute
- (injured) Injury / Illness

Latest roster transaction: June 6, 2020.

=== Transactions ===
Transactions of/for players on the roster during the 2020 regular season:

- On May 29, the Mayhem signed DPS Josh "Sideshow" Wilkinson on a 14-day contract.
- On June 6, the Mayhem DPS transferred Josh "Sideshow" Wilkinson to the Los Angeles Gladiators.

== Standings ==
Pos	Con	Team	Pld	W	BW	L	PCT	MW	ML	MT	MD	Qualification
1	ATL	Philadelphia Fusion	21	19	5	2	0.905	59	19	0	+40	Advance to playoffs
2	PAC	San Francisco Shock	21	18	7	3	0.857	56	17	2	+39	Advance to playoffs
3	ATL	Paris Eternal	21	15	4	6	0.714	50	31	0	+19	Advance to playoffs
4	ATL	Florida Mayhem	21	14	3	7	0.667	48	30	0	+18	Advance to playoffs
5	PAC	Los Angeles Valiant	21	11	1	10	0.524	41	41	0	0	Advance to playoffs
6	PAC	Los Angeles Gladiators	21	11	0	10	0.524	43	39	5	+4	Advance to play-ins
7	ATL	Atlanta Reign	21	10	0	11	0.476	43	35	0	+8	Advance to play-ins
8	PAC	Dallas Fuel	21	9	0	12	0.429	35	44	0	−9	Advance to play-ins
9	ATL	Toronto Defiant	21	7	1	14	0.333	32	48	0	−16	Advance to play-ins
10	ATL	Houston Outlaws	21	6	0	15	0.286	32	50	3	−18	Advance to play-ins
11	PAC	Vancouver Titans	21	6	0	15	0.286	23	48	0	−25	Advance to play-ins
12	ATL	Washington Justice	21	4	0	17	0.190	21	54	1	−33	Advance to play-ins
13	ATL	Boston Uprising	21	2	0	19	0.095	14	61	4	−47	Advance to play-ins

Source: The Overwatch League
Rules for classification: 1) Wins plus bonus wins 2) winning percentage (excluding bonus wins); 3) map differential; 4) head-to-head record; 5) head-to-head map differential

== Game log ==
=== Regular season ===
2020 game log (Regular season record: 14–7)
February–April: 4–4

1	February 15	Florida Mayhem	3	–	0	Houston Outlaws	Philadelphia, PA
	4:00 pm EST						The Met Philadelphia
		2	Busan			0	
		1	Havana			0	
		3	Eichenwalde			2	

2	February 16	Florida Mayhem	0	–	3	Philadelphia Fusion	Philadelphia, PA
	6:00 pm EST						The Met Philadelphia
		1	Lijiang Tower			2	
		2	Junkertown			3	
		0	Blizzard World			3	

3	February 29	New York Excelsior	3	–	0	Florida Mayhem	Houston, TX
	3:00 pm EST						Revention Music Center
		2	Ilios			0	
		4	King's Row			3	
		2	Temple of Anubis			1	

4	March 01	London Spitfire	3	–	2	Florida Mayhem	Houston, TX
	5:00 pm EST						Revention Music Center
		1	Ilios			2	
		2	Eichenwalde			1	
		3	Horizon Lunar Colony			4	
		3	Havana			2	
		2	Oasis			0	

5	March 07	Toronto Defiant	1	–	3	Florida Mayhem	Washington, DC
	3:00 pm EST						The Anthem
		2	Busan			1	
		0	Junkertown			1	
		1	Blizzard World			2	
		0	Hanamura			1	

6	March 29	Florida Mayhem	0	–	3	Atlanta Reign	Online
	8:00 pm UTC						

7	April 17	Florida Mayhem	3	–	0	Paris Eternal	Online
	11:00 pm UTC						

8	April 26	Florida Mayhem	3	–	0	Boston Uprising	Online
	8:00 pm UTC						

May Melee qualifiers: 3–0

9	May 03	Florida Mayhem	3	–	0	Boston Uprising	Online
	9:00 pm UTC						

10	May 10	Florida Mayhem	3	–	0	Vancouver Titans	Online
	11:00 pm UTC						

11	May 16	Florida Mayhem	3	–	1	Washington Justice	Online
	9:00 pm UTC						

Summer Showdown qualifiers: 2–1

12	June 13	Florida Mayhem	3	–	1	Dallas Fuel	Online
	9:00 pm UTC						

13	June 21	Florida Mayhem	1	–	3	Los Angeles Valiant	Online
	9:00 pm UTC						

14	June 27	Florida Mayhem	3	–	2	Houston Outlaws	Online
	7:00 pm UTC						

Countdown Cup qualifiers: 3–1

15	July 19	Florida Mayhem	3	–	1	Atlanta Reign	Online
	8:30 pm UTC						

16	July 24	Florida Mayhem	1	–	3	San Francisco Shock	Online
	9:00 pm UTC						

17	July 25	Florida Mayhem	3	–	0	Washington Justice	Online
	9:00 pm UTC						

18	August 02	Florida Mayhem	3	–	1	Los Angeles Gladiators	Online
	9:00 pm UTC						

August: 2–1

19	August 14	Florida Mayhem	3	–	1	Vancouver Titans	Online
	7:00 pm UTC						

20	August 16	Florida Mayhem	2	–	3	Los Angeles Valiant	Online
	9:00 pm UTC						

21	August 21	Florida Mayhem	3	–	1	Los Angeles Gladiators	Online
	9:00 pm UTC						

=== Midseason tournaments ===
2020 midseason tournaments game log
May Melee: 2–1

Quarterfinals	May 23	Florida Mayhem	3	–	1	Atlanta Reign	Online
	9:00 pm UTC						

Semifinals	May 24	Florida Mayhem	3	–	1	Philadelphia Fusion	Online
	9:00 pm UTC						

Finals	May 24	Florida Mayhem	2	–	4	San Francisco Shock	Online
	11:00 pm UTC						

Summer Showdown: 0–1

Knockouts	July 03	Florida Mayhem	1	–	3	Houston Outlaws	Online
	9:00 pm UTC						

Countdown Cup: 1–1

Quarterfinals	August 08	Florida Mayhem	3	–	0	Atlanta Reign	Online
	11:00 pm UTC						

Semifinals	August 09	Florida Mayhem	1	–	3	San Francisco Shock	Online
	5:00 pm UTC						

Bonus wins awarded: 3

=== Postseason ===
2020 playoff game log
North America Bracket: 2–2

Upper Round 1	September 05	Florida Mayhem	2	–	3	Los Angeles Valiant	Online
	9:00 pm UTC						

Lower Round 1	September 06	Florida Mayhem	3	–	0	Los Angeles Gladiators	Online
	7:00 pm UTC						

Lower Round 2	September 11	Florida Mayhem	3	–	0	Atlanta Reign	Online
	7:00 pm UTC						

Lower Round 3	September 12	Florida Mayhem	0	–	3	Washington Justice	Online
	9:00 pm UTC						
