= 2020 Paris Eternal season =

- Head coach: Yun "Rush" Hee-won
- General manager: Michael De Wit
- Owner: Drew McCourt
- Conference: Atlantic
- Division: North
- Region: North America

Results
- Record: 15–6 (.714)
- Place: North America: 3rd; League: 4th
- May Melee: Quarterfinals
- Summer Showdown: Champions
- Countdown Cup: Semifinals
- Season Playoffs: NA Lower Round 1
- Total Earnings: $165,000

The 2020 Paris Eternal season was the second season of Paris Eternal's existence in the Overwatch League and their first under head coach Yun "Rush" Hee-won. The Eternal planned to host three homestand weekends in the 2020 season at Zénith Paris in Paris, France, but all homestand matches were canceled due to the COVID-19 pandemic.

On 24 October, the Eternal signed former Element Mystic head coach Yun "Rush" Hee-won as their new head coach. The Eternal won their first ever tournament championship on 6 July after taking down the San Francisco Shock in the Summer Showdown finals. Paris finished the regular season with 15 wins, 4 bonus wins from midseason tournaments, and 6 losses to claim the third seed in the North America season playoffs; however, a 0–3 loss to the Washington Justice on 6 September in the North America playoffs ended their season.

== Preceding offseason ==
=== Organizational changes ===
In October 2019, Paris Eternal parted ways with Felix "Féfé" Munch, who joined the team as their head coach midway through their inaugural season, assistant coach Kyle "KyKy" Souder, and manager Alban "Albless" de la Grange. The team signed Kim "NineK" Beom-hoon, former assistant coach of the San Francisco Shock, as a coach two days later, although the team did not specify whether he would serve as the team's head coach or assistant coach. On 24 October, the Eternal announced the acquisition of the former Element Mystic head coach Yun "Rush" Hee-won as their new head coach. In addition, the team also picked up former Shanghai Dragons and Element Mystic assistant coach Jeong "Levi" Chung-Hyeok and former Toronto Defiant support player Go "Aid" Jae-yoon as assistant coaches. On 10 December, Eternal signed former Washington Justice coach Kyoung-Ey "AVALLA" Kim as their assistant general manager.

=== Roster changes ===
The Eternal enter the new season with no free agents, six players which they have the option to retain for another year, and four players under contract. The OWL's deadline to exercise a team option is 11 November, after which any players not retained will become a free agent. Free agency officially began on 7 October.

==== Acquisitions ====
The Eternal's first offseason acquisition was on 24 October, when they signed former Element DPS player Mystic Kim "SP9RK1E" Young-han, one of the most sought after free agents of the offseason. SP9RK1E will not be eligible to play until 31 May 2020, when he turns 18. The following day, the team picked up two more former Element Mystic players in DPS Jung "Xzi" Kihyo and tank Choi "Hanbin" Han-bin. On 23 November, Paris signed former Hangzhou Spark tank player Jeong "NoSmite" Da-Un. The team signed tank player Eoghan "Smex" O'Neill from Montreal Rebellion on 3 December. Paris rounded out their roster on 7 January with the signing of support player Brice "FDGod" Monsçavoir.

==== Departures ====
On 23 October, the Eternal announced that they would not exercise their option to retain DPS George "ShaDowBurn" Gushcha, DPS Karol "Danye" Szcześniak, main tank Roni "lhcloudy" Tiihonen, and off-tank Finnbjörn "Finnsi" Jónasson for the upcoming season.

== Roster ==
2020 Paris Eternal roster
Players
Coaches

Role	No.	Handle	Name	Nationality
Damage	10	NiCOgdh	Moret, Nicolas	France
Damage	99	SoOn	Tarlier, Terrence	France
Damage	1	Sp9rk1e	Jung Ki-hyo	South Korea
Damage	11	Xzi	Kim Yeong-han	South Korea
Tank	17	BenBest	Dieulafait, Benjamin	France
Tank	3	NoSmite	Jeong Da-un	South Korea
Tank	19	Hanbin	Choi Han-been	South Korea
Tank	20	Smex (I)	O'Neill, Eoghan	United Kingdom
Support	27	FDGod	Monsçavoir, Brice	France
Support	31	Fielder	Kwon Joon	South Korea

Head coach

- Yun "Rush" Hee-won

Legend:
- (I) Inactive
- (S) Suspended
- (2W) Two-way player
- Substitute
- (injured) Injury / Illness

Latest roster transaction: 7 May 2020.

=== Transactions ===
Transactions of/for players on the roster during the 2020 regular season:

- On 2 April, support Damien "HyP" Souville retired.
- On 2 May, the Eternal transferred support Harrison "Kruise" Pond to the Toronto Defiant.
- On 2 May, the Eternal signed support Joon "Fielder" Kwon.
- On 7 May, support Luís "Greyy" Perestrelo retired.

== Standings ==
Pos	Con	Team	Pld	W	BW	L	PCT	MW	ML	MT	MD	Qualification
1	ATL	Philadelphia Fusion	21	19	5	2	0.905	59	19	0	+40	Advance to playoffs
2	PAC	San Francisco Shock	21	18	7	3	0.857	56	17	2	+39	Advance to playoffs
3	ATL	Paris Eternal	21	15	4	6	0.714	50	31	0	+19	Advance to playoffs
4	ATL	Florida Mayhem	21	14	3	7	0.667	48	30	0	+18	Advance to playoffs
5	PAC	Los Angeles Valiant	21	11	1	10	0.524	41	41	0	0	Advance to playoffs
6	PAC	Los Angeles Gladiators	21	11	0	10	0.524	43	39	5	+4	Advance to play-ins
7	ATL	Atlanta Reign	21	10	0	11	0.476	43	35	0	+8	Advance to play-ins
8	PAC	Dallas Fuel	21	9	0	12	0.429	35	44	0	−9	Advance to play-ins
9	ATL	Toronto Defiant	21	7	1	14	0.333	32	48	0	−16	Advance to play-ins
10	ATL	Houston Outlaws	21	6	0	15	0.286	32	50	3	−18	Advance to play-ins
11	PAC	Vancouver Titans	21	6	0	15	0.286	23	48	0	−25	Advance to play-ins
12	ATL	Washington Justice	21	4	0	17	0.190	21	54	1	−33	Advance to play-ins
13	ATL	Boston Uprising	21	2	0	19	0.095	14	61	4	−47	Advance to play-ins

Source: The Overwatch League
Rules for classification: 1) Wins plus bonus wins 2) winning percentage (excluding bonus wins); 3) map differential; 4) head-to-head record; 5) head-to-head map differential

== Game log ==
=== Regular season ===
2020 game log (Regular season record: 15–6)
February–April: 5–4

1	8 February	Toronto Defiant	3	–	1	Paris Eternal	New York City, NY
	7:00 pm CET						Hammerstein Ballroom
		0	Lijiang Tower			2	
		4	Eichenwalde			3	
		3	Horizon Lunar Colony			2	
		3	Havana			0	

2	9 February	London Spitfire	0	–	3	Paris Eternal	New York City, NY
	7:00 pm CET						Hammerstein Ballroom
		0	Nepal			2	
		3	King's Row			4	
		1	Hanamura			2	

3	22 February	Paris Eternal	3	–	1	Washington Justice	Washington, DC
	1:00 am CET						The Anthem
		2	Ilios			1	
		1	Temple of Anubis			2	
		2	Junkertown			1	
		3	Blizzard World			2	

4	1 March	Paris Eternal	3	–	1	Atlanta Reign	Houston, TX
	9:00 pm CET						Revention Music Center
		2	Busan			1	
		3	King's Row			1	
		1	Hanamura			2	
		3	Dorado			2	

5	7 March	Paris Eternal	0	–	3	Houston Outlaws	Washington, DC
	11:00 pm CET						The Anthem
		1	Oasis			2	
		0	Havana			1	
		1	Eichenwalde			2	

6	8 March	Paris Eternal	3	–	2	Philadelphia Fusion	Washington, DC
	9:00 pm CET						The Anthem
		2	Ilios			0	
		3	Junkertown			2	
		0	Blizzard World			1	
		1	Hanamura			2	
		2	Oasis			1	

7	5 April	Paris Eternal	3	–	1	Houston Outlaws	Online
	8:00 pm UTC						

8	11 April	Paris Eternal	2	–	3	Philadelphia Fusion	Online
	8:00 pm UTC						

9	17 April	Paris Eternal	0	–	3	Florida Mayhem	Online
	11:00 pm UTC						

May Melee qualifiers: 2–1

10	3 May	Paris Eternal	2	–	3	Philadelphia Fusion	Online
	7:00 pm UTC						

11	9 May	Paris Eternal	3	–	1	Los Angeles Gladiators	Online
	7:00 pm UTC						

12	17 May	Paris Eternal	3	–	0	Dallas Fuel	Online
	7:00 pm UTC						

Summer Showdown qualifiers: 2–1

13	13 June	Paris Eternal	3	–	2	Boston Uprising	Online
	7:00 pm UTC						

14	20 June	Paris Eternal	0	–	3	San Francisco Shock	Online
	7:00 pm UTC						

15	28 June	Paris Eternal	3	–	1	Los Angeles Valiant	Online
	7:00 pm UTC						

Countdown Cup qualifiers: 4–0

16	17 July	Paris Eternal	3	–	0	Vancouver Titans	Online
	7:00 pm UTC						

17	19 July	Paris Eternal	3	–	0	Toronto Defiant	Online
	7:00 pm UTC						

18	26 July	Paris Eternal	3	–	0	Los Angeles Gladiators	Online
	7:00 pm UTC						

19	1 August	Paris Eternal	3	–	1	Washington Justice	Online
	7:00 pm UTC						

August: 2–0

20	15 August	Paris Eternal	3	–	2	Atlanta Reign	Online
	7:00 pm UTC						

21	23 August	Paris Eternal	3	–	1	Dallas Fuel	Online
	7:00 pm UTC						

=== Midseason tournaments ===
2020 midseason tournaments game log
May Melee: 1–1

Knockouts	23 May	Paris Eternal	3	–	2	Boston Uprising	Online
	1:00 am UTC						

Quarterfinals	24 May	Paris Eternal	2	–	3	Los Angeles Valiant	Online
	1:00 am UTC						

Summer Showdown: 4–0

Knockouts	3 July	Paris Eternal	3	–	1	Dallas Fuel	Online
	7:00 pm UTC						

Quarterfinals	4 July	Paris Eternal	3	–	1	Vancouver Titans	Online
	7:00 pm UTC						

Semifinals	5 July	Paris Eternal	3	–	2	San Francisco Shock	Online
	9:20 pm UTC						

Finals	6 July	Paris Eternal	4	–	3	Philadelphia Fusion	Online
	12:00 midnight UTC						

Countdown Cup: 1–1

Quarterfinals	9 August	Paris Eternal	3	–	1	Los Angeles Valiant	Online
	1:00 am UTC						

Semifinals	9 August	Paris Eternal	1	–	3	Philadelphia Fusion	Online
	7:00 pm UTC						

Bonus wins awarded: 4

=== Postseason ===
2020 playoff game log
North America Bracket: 0–2

Upper Round 1	6 September	Paris Eternal	2	–	3	Atlanta Reign	Online
	1:00 am UTC						

Lower Round 1	6 September	Paris Eternal	0	–	3	Washington Justice	Online
	9:00 pm UTC						
