= 2020 Philadelphia Fusion season =

- North America Region champions
- Head coach: Kim "KDG" Dong-gun
- Owner: Comcast Spectacor
- Arena(s): The Met Philadelphia
- Conference: Atlantic
- Division: South
- Region: North America

Results
- Record: 19–2 (.905)
- Place: North America: 1st; League: 2nd
- May Melee: Semifinals
- Summer Showdown: Finals
- Countdown Cup: Finals
- Season Playoffs: GF Lower Round 1
- Total Earnings: $430,000

The 2020 Philadelphia Fusion season was the third season of the Philadelphia Fusion's existence in the Overwatch League and their first under head coach Kim "KDG" Dong-gun. The Fusion planned to host three homestand weekends in the 2020 season, with the first two taking place at The Met in Philadelphia and the third at the Boardwalk Hall in Atlantic City. While their first homestand weekend took place, all following homestand events were canceled due to the COVID-19 pandemic.

On August 16, in their final regular season game, the Fusion clinched the top seed in the North America region for the season playoffs with a win over the San Francisco Shock. In the first round of the North America bracket, Philadelphia swept the Los Angeles Gladiators, 3–0. The following day, the Fusion swept the Los Angeles Valiant, 3–0, sending them to the North America upper bracket finals. In the upper finals match, which took place on September 12, Philadelphia were handed their first loss of the postseason, falling to San Francisco by a score of 1–3. The loss sent the Fusion to the North America lower bracket finals, where they swept the Washington Justice, 3–0, sending them to the Grand Finals bracket.

The Fusion's first match in the Grand Finals bracket was on October 8, where they were swept, 0–3, by the Shanghai Dragons. The following day, they were swept, 0–3, by the Seoul Dynasty, ending their postseason run.

== Preceding offseason ==
=== Organizational changes ===
In September 2019, Director of Overwatch Operations Yann "Kirby" Luu, who was also the head coach of the team in 2018, left the team. Less than a month later, both co-head coaches Se-hwi "NamedHwi" Go and Elliot "Hayes" Hayes announced their departures from the team. The team found their replacement on October 25 with the hiring of former Seoul Dynasty head coach Kim "KDG" Dong-gun. Additionally, the team promoted Roston Yoo from team manager to assistant general manager the same day.

=== Roster changes ===
Free agents
Role	Player		Contract status	Date signed	2020 team
Role	Handle	Name	Contract status	Date signed	2020 team
Damage	Carpe	Jae-Hyeok Lee	Free agent	October 23	Philadelphia Fusion
Damage	Snillo	Simon Ekström	Free agent	October 30	Philadelphia Fusion
Legend Re-signed/Retained by the Fusion. Departed from the Fusion.

The Fusion enter the new season with two free agents, four players which they have the option to retain for another year, and three players under contract. The OWL's deadline to exercise a team option is November 11, after which any players not retained will become a free agent. Free agency officially began on October 7.

==== Acquisitions ====
The Fusion's first acquisitions of the offseason were announced on October 30. The team traded tank Shin "BERNAR" Se-won and support Kim "Fuze" Tae-hoon from Fusion University to the London Spitfire in exchange for tank Kim "Fury" Jun-ho, signed former Toronto Defiant DPS Lee "Ivy" Seung-hun, acquired support Daniel "FunnyAstro" Hathaway from the Atlanta Reign, and promoted support Kim "Alarm" Kyeong-bo from Fusion University. Additionally, the team announced that DPS Josue "Eqo" Corona as part of their roster, although he had been let go from the team earlier in the month. On November 25, the team announced that they had acquired DPS Jeong "Heesu" Hee-su from RunAway, although he would not turn 18, and thus ineligible to play, until late March.

On November 26, the acquisition of DPS Philip "ChipSa" Graham, a popular streamer, was announced. This signing proved to be controversial, as several figures in the professional Overwatch community criticized the signing. Namely, Envy Gaming content creator Justin "Jayne" Conroy noted his lack of professional experience and accused the Fusion of nepotism, as ChipSa's brother Chris "ChrisTFer" Graham works as an assistant coach for the team.

==== Departures ====
The Fusion's first free agent to depart from the team was support Alberto "neptuNo" González, who had been with the team since its inception in 2017, as the team announced that they had parted ways with him on October 21. The following day, the team elected not to exercise their option to retain DPS Josue "Eqo" Corona, who was also an inaugural season team member. Support Elijah "Elk" Gallagher and DPS Finley "Kyb" Adisi, the final two players that were under team options, were released a day later. Although he was announced as a part of the Fusion's roster in October, DPS Simon "Snillo" Ekström was released from the team on December 19.

== Final roster ==
2020 Philadelphia Fusion roster
Players
Coaches

Role	No.	Handle	Name	Nationality
Damage	18	Carpe	Lee Jae-hyeok	South Korea
Damage	2	Ivy	Lee Seung-hyun	South Korea
Damage	15	EQO	Corona, Josue	Israel
Damage	1	ChipSa	Graham, Philip	United Kingdom
Damage	10	Heesu	Jeong Hee-su	South Korea
Tank	9	SADO	Kim Su-min	South Korea
Tank	21	Poko	Gouzerch, Gael	France
Tank	19	Fury	Kim Jun-ho	South Korea
Support	33	FunnyAstro	Hathaway, Daniel	United Kingdom
Support	42	Boombox	Charles, Isaac	United Kingdom
Support	17	Alarm	Kim Kyung-bo	South Korea

Head coach

- Kim "KDG" Dong-gun

Legend:
- (I) Inactive
- (S) Suspended
- (2W) Two-way player
- Substitute
- (injured) Injury / Illness

Latest roster transaction: December 19, 2019.

== Standings ==
Pos	Con	Team	Pld	W	BW	L	PCT	MW	ML	MT	MD	Qualification
1	ATL	Philadelphia Fusion	21	19	5	2	0.905	59	19	0	+40	Advance to playoffs
2	PAC	San Francisco Shock	21	18	7	3	0.857	56	17	2	+39	Advance to playoffs
3	ATL	Paris Eternal	21	15	4	6	0.714	50	31	0	+19	Advance to playoffs
4	ATL	Florida Mayhem	21	14	3	7	0.667	48	30	0	+18	Advance to playoffs
5	PAC	Los Angeles Valiant	21	11	1	10	0.524	41	41	0	0	Advance to playoffs
6	PAC	Los Angeles Gladiators	21	11	0	10	0.524	43	39	5	+4	Advance to play-ins
7	ATL	Atlanta Reign	21	10	0	11	0.476	43	35	0	+8	Advance to play-ins
8	PAC	Dallas Fuel	21	9	0	12	0.429	35	44	0	−9	Advance to play-ins
9	ATL	Toronto Defiant	21	7	1	14	0.333	32	48	0	−16	Advance to play-ins
10	ATL	Houston Outlaws	21	6	0	15	0.286	32	50	3	−18	Advance to play-ins
11	PAC	Vancouver Titans	21	6	0	15	0.286	23	48	0	−25	Advance to play-ins
12	ATL	Washington Justice	21	4	0	17	0.190	21	54	1	−33	Advance to play-ins
13	ATL	Boston Uprising	21	2	0	19	0.095	14	61	4	−47	Advance to play-ins

Source: The Overwatch League
Rules for classification: 1) Wins plus bonus wins 2) winning percentage (excluding bonus wins); 3) map differential; 4) head-to-head record; 5) head-to-head map differential

== Game log ==
=== Regular season ===
2020 game log (Regular season record: 19–2)
February–April: 9–1

1	February 15	Washington Justice	1	–	3	Philadelphia Fusion	Philadelphia, PA
	6:00 pm EST						The Met Philadelphia
		1	Nepal			2	
		2	Havana			1	
		2	King's Row			3	
		1	Temple of Anubis			3	

2	February 16	Florida Mayhem	0	–	3	Philadelphia Fusion	Philadelphia, PA
	6:00 pm EST						The Met Philadelphia
		1	Busan			2	
		0	Horizon Lunar Colony			2	
		3	Havana			2	
		3	Eichenwalde			4	

3	February 22	New York Excelsior	1	–	3	Philadelphia Fusion	Washington, DC
	3:00 pm EST						The Anthem
		1	Busan			2	
		0	Horizon Lunar Colony			2	
		3	Havana			2	
		3	Eichenwalde			4	

4	February 23	Toronto Defiant	2	–	3	Philadelphia Fusion	Washington, DC
	5:00 pm EST						The Anthem
		0	Oasis			2	
		1	Temple of Anubis			2	
		2	Dorado			1	
		6	King's Row			5	
		0	Nepal			2	

5	March 01	Boston Uprising	0	–	3	Philadelphia Fusion	Houston, TX
	1:00 pm EST						Revention Music Center
		0	Lijiang Tower			2	
		1	King's Row			2	
		1	Hanamura			2	

6	March 08	Paris Eternal	3	–	2	Philadelphia Fusion	Washington, DC
	3:00 pm EDT						The Anthem
		2	Ilios			0	
		3	Junkertown			2	
		0	Blizzard World			1	
		1	Hanamura			2	
		2	Oasis			1	

7	April 05	Philadelphia Fusion	3	–	0	Washington Justice	Online
	10:00 pm UTC						

8	April 11	Philadelphia Fusion	3	–	2	Paris Eternal	Online
	8:00 pm UTC						

9	April 12	Philadelphia Fusion	3	–	2	Atlanta Reign	Online
	10:00 pm UTC						

10	April 25	Philadelphia Fusion	3	–	0	Atlanta Reign	Online
	8:00 pm UTC						

May Melee qualifiers: 3–0

11	May 03	Philadelphia Fusion	3	–	2	Paris Eternal	Online
	7:00 pm UTC						

12	May 10	Philadelphia Fusion	3	–	1	Dallas Fuel	Online
	7:00 pm UTC						

13	May 17	Philadelphia Fusion	3	–	0	Vancouver Titans	Online
	9:00 pm UTC						

Summer Showdown qualifiers: 2–1

14	June 14	Philadelphia Fusion	3	–	0	Houston Outlaws	Online
	7:00 pm UTC						

15	June 21	Philadelphia Fusion	3	–	0	Boston Uprising	Online
	7:00 pm UTC						

16	June 28	Philadelphia Fusion	0	–	3	San Francisco Shock	Online
	11:00 pm UTC						

Countdown Cup qualifiers: 4–0

17	July 26	Philadelphia Fusion	3	–	2	Los Angeles Gladiators	Online
	1:00 am UTC						

18	July 26	Philadelphia Fusion	3	–	0	Toronto Defiant	Online
	9:00 pm UTC						

19	July 31	Philadelphia Fusion	3	–	0	Dallas Fuel	Online
	7:00 pm UTC						

20	August 02	Philadelphia Fusion	3	–	0	Los Angeles Valiant	Online
	11:00 pm UTC						

August: 1–0

21	August 16	Philadelphia Fusion	3	–	0	San Francisco Shock	Online
	1:00 am UTC						

2020 season schedule

=== Midseason tournaments ===
2020 midseason tournaments game log
May Melee: 1–1

Quarterfinals	May 23	Philadelphia Fusion	3	–	1	Los Angeles Gladiators	Online
	11:00 pm UTC						

Semifinals	May 24	Philadelphia Fusion	1	–	3	Florida Mayhem	Online
	9:00 pm UTC						

Summer Showdown: 2–1

Quarterfinals	July 05	Philadelphia Fusion	3	–	0	Houston Outlaws	Online
	1:00 am UTC						

Semifinals	July 05	Philadelphia Fusion	3	–	0	Toronto Defiant	Online
	8:00 pm UTC						

Finals	July 06	Philadelphia Fusion	3	–	4	Paris Eternal	Online
	12:00 midnight UTC						

Countdown Cup: 2–1

Quarterfinals	August 08	Philadelphia Fusion	3	–	0	Los Angeles Gladiators	Online
	9:00 pm UTC						

Semifinals	August 09	Philadelphia Fusion	3	–	1	Paris Eternal	Online
	7:00 pm UTC						

Finals	August 09	Philadelphia Fusion	2	–	4	San Francisco Shock	Online
	9:00 pm UTC						

Bonus wins awarded: 5

=== Postseason ===
2020 playoff game log
North America Bracket: 3–1

Upper Round 1	September 05	Philadelphia Fusion	3	–	0	Los Angeles Gladiators	Online
	7:00 pm UTC						

Upper Round 2	September 06	Philadelphia Fusion	3	–	0	Los Angeles Valiant	Online
	11:00 pm UTC						

Upper Finals	September 12	Philadelphia Fusion	1	–	3	San Francisco Shock	Online
	7:00 pm UTC						

Lower Finals	September 13	Philadelphia Fusion	3	–	0	Washington Justice	Online
	7:00 pm UTC						

Grand Finals Bracket: 0–2

Upper Round 1	October 8	Philadelphia Fusion	0	–	3	Shanghai Dragons	Online
	1:00 pm UTC						

Lower Round 1	October 9	Philadelphia Fusion	0	–	3	Seoul Dynasty	Online
	11:00 am UTC						
