= 2020 Houston Outlaws season =

- Head coach: Harsha Bandi
- General manager: Matt Rodriguez
- Owner: Beasley Media Group
- Arena(s): Revention Music Center
- Conference: Atlantic
- Division: South
- Region: North America

Results
- Record: 6–15 (.286)
- Place: North America: 10th; League: 16th
- May Melee: Knockouts
- Summer Showdown: Quarterfinals
- Countdown Cup: Knockouts
- Season Playoffs: Did not qualify
- Total Earnings: $5,000

The 2020 Houston Outlaws season is the third season of the Houston Outlaws's existence in the Overwatch League (OWL). The Outlaws planned to host two homestand weekends at the Revention Music Center in Houston's downtown Theater District. While their first homestand took place, all other homestand matches were canceled due to the COVID-19 pandemic.

The Outlaws failed to make it past the quarterfinals in each of the three midseason tournaments of the season. Houston ended the season with a 6–15 record and were eliminated from postseason contention on September 3 after a 1–3 to the Boston Uprising in the North America play-ins tournament.

== Preceding offseason ==
=== Sale of the franchise ===
On June 12, 2019, Immortals Gaming Club (IGC), the parent company of Immortals and the Los Angeles Valiant, acquired Infinite Esports, the parent company of Houston Outlaws and OpTic Gaming, marking the first major sale of any Overwatch League franchise. By OWL rules, one company may not own more than one OWL franchise; while Riot Games and Activision Blizzard approved the sale, IGC operated Valiant and Outlaws as entirely separate entities, with oversight by OWL representatives, until they sold the Outlaws.

On November 14, 2019, Beasley Broadcast Group announced the acquisition of the Houston Outlaws from Immortals Gaming Club. The purchase marked the company's third esports venture.

=== Organizational changes ===
In September 2019, the Outlaws released both head coach Kim "TaiRong" Tae-yeong and assistant coach Kim "Hyunwoo" Hyun-woo – both who had been in their positions since the team's inception in 2017 – after Houston's disappointing 2019 campaign. The following month, Houston signed Harsha Bandi, the former assistant coach of the Vancouver Titans and former analyst of the San Francisco Shock. Following, the team signed former Montreal Rebellion coach Chris "Dream" Myrick to their coaching staff.

=== Roster changes ===
Free agents
Role	Player		Contract status	Date signed	2020 team
Role	Handle	Name	Contract status	Date signed	2020 team
Damage	Arhan	Won-Hyeop Jung	Free agent	–	–
Support	Bani	Christopher Benell	Free agent	–	–
Support	Boink	Daniel Pence	Free agent	October 19	Houston Outlaws
Legend Re-signed/Retained by the Outlaws. Departed from the Outlaws.

The Outlaws enter the new season with three free agents, one player which they have the option to retain for another year, and six players under contract. The OWL's deadline to exercise a team option is November 11, after which any players not retained will become a free agent. Free agency officially began on October 7.

==== Acquisitions ====
The first signing for the 2020 season was on October 18, when the Outlaws signed DPS João Pedro "Hydration" Goes Telles, who had most recently played for the Los Angeles Gladiators. Three days later, the team acquired DPS Jeffrey "blasé" Tsang from the Boston Uprising. The following month, Houston picked up former Vancouver Titans flex support player Jung-geun "Rapel" Kim and former New York Excelsior flex tank Kim "MekO" Tae-hong. The team added former Seoul Dynasty support player Lee "Jecse" Seong-soo on January 2.

==== Departures ====
On October 17, the Outlaws announced that they would not re-sign free agent DPS Jung "Arhan" Won-hyeop, who had been with the team since its inception in 2017. The following month, on November 9, the team announced that they would also not re-sign main support Chris "Bani" Bennell. On December 7, flex DPS Jake "Jake" Lyon announced that was retiring from professional Overwatch competition. A month later, on January 14, off-tank player Matt "Coolmatt" Iorio retired as a player and moved to an organizational role with the Outlaws.

== Roster ==
2020 Houston Outlaws roster
Players
Coaches

Role	No.	Handle	Name	Nationality
Damage	6	Danteh	Cruz, Dante	United States
Damage	49	LiNkzr	Masalin, Jiri	Finland
Damage	22	blasé	Tsang, Jeffrey	United States
Tank	99	Hydration	Goes Telles, João Pedro	United States
Tank	17	Muma	Wilmot, Austin	United States
Tank	22	MekO	Kim Tae-hong	South Korea
Support	16	Rapel	Kim Jun-keun	South Korea
Support	13	Boink	Pence, Daniel	United States
Support	20	Jecse	Lee Seung-soo	South Korea

Head coach

- Harsha Bandi

Legend:
- (I) Inactive
- (S) Suspended
- (2W) Two-way player
- Substitute
- (injured) Injury / Illness

Latest roster transaction: August 1, 2020.

=== Transactions ===
Transactions of/for players on the roster during the 2020 regular season:

- On July 15, the Outlaws released tank Alexandre "Spree" Vanhomwegen.
- On August 1, support Shane "Rawkus" Flaherty retired.

== Standings ==
Pos	Con	Team	Pld	W	BW	L	PCT	MW	ML	MT	MD	Qualification
1	ATL	Philadelphia Fusion	21	19	5	2	0.905	59	19	0	+40	Advance to playoffs
2	PAC	San Francisco Shock	21	18	7	3	0.857	56	17	2	+39	Advance to playoffs
3	ATL	Paris Eternal	21	15	4	6	0.714	50	31	0	+19	Advance to playoffs
4	ATL	Florida Mayhem	21	14	3	7	0.667	48	30	0	+18	Advance to playoffs
5	PAC	Los Angeles Valiant	21	11	1	10	0.524	41	41	0	0	Advance to playoffs
6	PAC	Los Angeles Gladiators	21	11	0	10	0.524	43	39	5	+4	Advance to play-ins
7	ATL	Atlanta Reign	21	10	0	11	0.476	43	35	0	+8	Advance to play-ins
8	PAC	Dallas Fuel	21	9	0	12	0.429	35	44	0	−9	Advance to play-ins
9	ATL	Toronto Defiant	21	7	1	14	0.333	32	48	0	−16	Advance to play-ins
10	ATL	Houston Outlaws	21	6	0	15	0.286	32	50	3	−18	Advance to play-ins
11	PAC	Vancouver Titans	21	6	0	15	0.286	23	48	0	−25	Advance to play-ins
12	ATL	Washington Justice	21	4	0	17	0.190	21	54	1	−33	Advance to play-ins
13	ATL	Boston Uprising	21	2	0	19	0.095	14	61	4	−47	Advance to play-ins

Source: The Overwatch League
Rules for classification: 1) Wins plus bonus wins 2) winning percentage (excluding bonus wins); 3) map differential; 4) head-to-head record; 5) head-to-head map differential

== Game log ==
=== Regular season ===
2020 game log (Regular season record: 6–15)
February–April 4–7

1	February 15	Florida Mayhem	3	–	0	Houston Outlaws	Philadelphia, PA
	3:00 pm CST						The Met Philadelphia
		2	Busan			0	
		1	Havana			0	
		3	Eichenwalde			2	

2	February 16	Washington Justice	3	–	0	Houston Outlaws	Philadelphia, PA
	3:00 pm CST						The Met Philadelphia
		2	Lijiang Tower			0	
		3	Junkertown			1	
		3	King's Row			2	

3	February 22	Boston Uprising	3	–	2	Houston Outlaws	Washington, DC
	4:00 pm CST						The Anthem
		2	Ilios			0	
		2	Temple of Anubis			2	
		3	Dorado			1	
		3	Blizzard World			3	
		0	Oasis			2	
		1	Nepal			2	
		2	Lijiang Tower			0	

4	February 23	New York Excelsior	3	–	0	Houston Outlaws	Washington, DC
	2:00 pm CST						The Anthem
		2	Ilios			0	
		2	Hanamura			1	
		3	Havana			0	

5	February 29	London Spitfire	3	–	2	Houston Outlaws	Houston, TX
	6:00 pm CST						Revention Music Center
		2	Busan			0	
		2	Blizzard World			1	
		1	Temple of Anubis			2	
		2	Junkertown			3	
		2	Ilios			1	

6	March 01	Toronto Defiant	1	–	3	Houston Outlaws	Houston, TX
	6:00 pm CST						Revention Music Center
		2	Nepal			1	
		3	King's Row			4	
		0	Horizon Lunar Colony			1	
		1	Dorado			2	

7	March 07	Paris Eternal	0	–	3	Houston Outlaws	Washington, DC
	4:00 pm CST						The Anthem
		1	Oasis			2	
		0	Havana			1	
		1	Eichenwalde			2	

8	April 05	Houston Outlaws	1	–	3	Paris Eternal	Online
	8:00 pm UTC						

9	April 11	Houston Outlaws	3	–	1	Boston Uprising	Online
	10:00 pm UTC						

10	April 12	Houston Outlaws	3	–	2	Toronto Defiant	Online
	8:00 pm UTC						

11	April 26	Houston Outlaws	2	–	3	Dallas Fuel	Online
	10:00 pm UTC						

May Melee qualifiers: 1–3

12	May 02	Houston Outlaws	0	–	3	San Francisco Shock	Online
	11:00 pm UTC						

13	May 09	Houston Outlaws	0	–	3	Atlanta Reign	Online
	11:00 pm UTC						

14	May 16	Houston Outlaws	3	–	0	Vancouver Titans	Online
	7:00 pm UTC						

Summer Showdown qualifiers: 1–3

15	June 14	Houston Outlaws	0	–	3	Philadelphia Fusion	Online
	7:00 pm UTC						

16	June 20	Houston Outlaws	3	–	1	Los Angeles Gladiators	Online
	11:00 pm UTC						

17	June 27	Houston Outlaws	2	–	3	Florida Mayhem	Online
	7:00 pm UTC						

Countdown Cup qualifiers: 0–4

18	July 17	Houston Outlaws	2	–	3	Dallas Fuel	Online
	9:00 pm UTC						

19	July 26	Houston Outlaws	1	–	3	Washington Justice	Online
	11:00 pm UTC						

20	July 31	Houston Outlaws	2	–	3	Los Angeles Valiant	Online
	9:00 pm UTC						

21	August 01	Houston Outlaws	0	–	3	San Francisco Shock	Online
	11:00 pm UTC						

=== Midseason tournaments ===
2020 midseason tournaments game log
May Melee: 0–1

Knockouts	May 22	Houston Outlaws	1	–	3	Dallas Fuel	Online
	7:30 pm UTC						

Summer: 1–1

Knockouts	July 03	Houston Outlaws	3	–	1	Florida Mayhem	Online
	9:00 pm UTC						

Quarterfinals	July 05	Houston Outlaws	0	–	3	Philadelphia Fusion	Online
	1:00 am UTC						

Countdown Cup: 0–1

Knockouts	August 07	Houston Outlaws	0	–	3	Los Angeles Valiant	Online
	9:00 pm UTC						

Bonus wins awarded: 0

=== Postseason ===
2020 playoff game log
North America Play-ins: 0–1

Round 1	September 03	Houston Outlaws	1	–	3	Boston Uprising	Online
	7:00 pm UTC						
