= 2020 Atlanta Reign season =

- Head coach: Brad "Sephy" Rajani
- General manager: Paul Hamilton
- Owner: Atlanta Esports Ventures
- Conference: Atlantic
- Division: South
- Region: North America

Results
- Record: 10–11 (.476)
- Place: North America: 7th; League: 12th
- May Melee: Quarterfinals
- Summer Showdown: Quarterfinals
- Countdown Cup: Quarterfinals
- Season Playoffs: NA Lower Round 2
- Total Earnings: $85,000

The 2020 Atlanta Reign season was the second season of the Atlanta Reign's existence in the Overwatch League and the team's second under head coach Brad "Sephy" Rajani. Atlanta planned to host two homestand weekends in the 2020 season, with the first at the Coca-Cola Roxy in late March and the second at a different, undetermined location in mid-June, but all homestand matches were canceled due to the COVID-19 pandemic.

The Reign finished in the quarterfinals in each of the three midseason tournaments of the 2020 season. After advancing through the North America play-ins to the season playoffs, Atlanta was eliminated from North America playoff bracket by the Florida Mayhem.

== Preceding offseason ==
=== Organizational changes ===
In late October, the Reign announced the departure of player development coach Cas "Casores" van Andel. The following month, Atlanta picked up GC Busan Kim "Mentalist" Chung-in as an assistant coach.

=== Roster changes ===
The Reign enter the new season with no free agents, nine players which they have the option to retain for another year, and one player under contract. The OWL's deadline to exercise a team option is November 11, after which any players not retained will become a free agent. Free agency officially began on October 7.

==== Acquisitions ====
The Reign's first signing of the offseason was announced on October 31, when the team promoted tank Xander "Hawk" Domecq from their academy team ATL Academy. In addition, the team also announced that tank Blake "Gator" Scott would no longer be on a two-way contract with ATL Academy and would strictly play for the Reign. On November 12, the team announced the signing of GC Busan Wave DPS Kim "Edison" Tae-hoon. The team added another DPS three days later when they signed Hugo "SharP" Sahlberg from Team Envy. The Reign announced their full roster for the 2020 season on January 31, which included the promotion of former Reign support player Steven "Kodak" Rosenberger from ATL Academy and signing of support player Anthony "Fire" King.

==== Departures ====
The Reign's first departure was on October 30, when it was announced that support player Daniel "FunnyAstro" Hathaway had been signed to the Philadelphia Fusion. The following week, on November 8, the team announced that they would not pick up off-tank Seo "Daco" Dong-hyung's option for another season of play. The following day, the team also elected not to exercise their option to retain DPS Ilya "NLaaeR" Koppalov.

== Roster ==
2020 Atlanta Reign roster
Players
Coaches

Role	No.	Handle	Name	Nationality
Damage	7	Edison	Kim Tae-hoon	South Korea
Damage	9	SharP	Sahlberg, Hugo	Sweden
Damage	10	Erster	Jeong Joon	South Korea
Damage	18	Saucy	Roland, Garrett	United States
Tank	1	Gator	Scott, Blake	United States
Tank	4	frd	Goebel, Nathan	United States
Tank	6	Pokpo	Park Hyeon-jun	South Korea
Tank	8	Hawk	Domecq, Xander	United States
Support	0	Fire	King, Anthony	United States
Support	11	Dogman	Bowerman, Dusttin	United States
Support	20	Lr1s	Kim Seung-hyun	South Korea
Support	66	Masaa	Kantanen, Petja	Finland

Head coach

- Brad "Sephy" Rajani

Legend:
- (I) Inactive
- (S) Suspended
- (2W) Two-way player
- Substitute
- (injured) Injury / Illness

Latest roster transaction: July 31, 2020.

=== Transactions ===
Transactions of/for players on the roster during the 2020 regular season:

- On July 17, DPS Andrej "Babybay" Francisty retired.
- On July 18, support Steven "Kodak" Rosenberger retired.
- On July 24, the Reign signed DPS Garrett "Saucy" Roland.
- On July 31, the Reign signed support Kim "Lr1s" Seung-hyun.

== Standings ==
Pos	Con	Team	Pld	W	BW	L	PCT	MW	ML	MT	MD	Qualification
1	ATL	Philadelphia Fusion	21	19	5	2	0.905	59	19	0	+40	Advance to playoffs
2	PAC	San Francisco Shock	21	18	7	3	0.857	56	17	2	+39	Advance to playoffs
3	ATL	Paris Eternal	21	15	4	6	0.714	50	31	0	+19	Advance to playoffs
4	ATL	Florida Mayhem	21	14	3	7	0.667	48	30	0	+18	Advance to playoffs
5	PAC	Los Angeles Valiant	21	11	1	10	0.524	41	41	0	0	Advance to playoffs
6	PAC	Los Angeles Gladiators	21	11	0	10	0.524	43	39	5	+4	Advance to play-ins
7	ATL	Atlanta Reign	21	10	0	11	0.476	43	35	0	+8	Advance to play-ins
8	PAC	Dallas Fuel	21	9	0	12	0.429	35	44	0	−9	Advance to play-ins
9	ATL	Toronto Defiant	21	7	1	14	0.333	32	48	0	−16	Advance to play-ins
10	ATL	Houston Outlaws	21	6	0	15	0.286	32	50	3	−18	Advance to play-ins
11	PAC	Vancouver Titans	21	6	0	15	0.286	23	48	0	−25	Advance to play-ins
12	ATL	Washington Justice	21	4	0	17	0.190	21	54	1	−33	Advance to play-ins
13	ATL	Boston Uprising	21	2	0	19	0.095	14	61	4	−47	Advance to play-ins

Source: The Overwatch League
Rules for classification: 1) Wins plus bonus wins 2) winning percentage (excluding bonus wins); 3) map differential; 4) head-to-head record; 5) head-to-head map differential

== Game log ==
=== Regular season ===
2020 game log (Regular season record: 10–11)
February–April: 4–3

1	February 29	Toronto Defiant	0	–	3	Atlanta Reign	Houston, TX
	5:00 pm EST						Revention Music Center
Hosted by Houston Outlaws
		0	Nepal			2	
		0	Blizzard World			1	
		1	Temple of Anubis			2	

2	March 01	Paris Eternal	3	–	1	Atlanta Reign	Houston, TX
	3:00 pm EST						Revention Music Center
Hosted by Houston Outlaws
		2	Busan			1	
		3	King's Row			1	
		1	Hanamura			2	
		3	Dorado			2	

3	March 08	Boston Uprising	0	–	3	Atlanta Reign	Washington, DC
	7:00 pm EDT						The Anthem
Hosted by Washington Justice
		0	Oasis			2	
		1	Havana			2	
		2	Eichenwalde			3	

4	March 29	Atlanta Reign	3	–	0	Florida Mayhem	Online
	8:00 pm UTC						

5	April 12	Atlanta Reign	2	–	3	Philadelphia Fusion	Online
	10:00 pm UTC						

6	April 16	Atlanta Reign	3	–	0	Washington Justice	Online
	11:00 pm UTC						

7	April 25	Atlanta Reign	0	–	3	Philadelphia Fusion	Online
	8:00 pm UTC						

May Melee qualifiers: 1–2

8	May 02	Atlanta Reign	2	–	3	Los Angeles Valiant	Online
	9:00 pm UTC						

9	May 09	Atlanta Reign	3	–	0	Houston Outlaws	Online
	11:00 pm UTC						

10	May 17	Atlanta Reign	0	–	3	San Francisco Shock	Online
	1:00 am UTC						

Summer Showdown qualifiers: 2–1

11	June 13	Atlanta Reign	1	–	3	Los Angeles Gladiators	Online
	11:00 pm UTC						

12	June 20	Atlanta Reign	3	–	0	Toronto Defiant	Online
	9:00 pm UTC						

13	June 28	Atlanta Reign	3	–	0	Vancouver Titans	Online
	9:00 pm UTC						

Countdown Cup qualifiers: 3–1

14	July 18	Atlanta Reign	3	–	0	Los Angeles Valiant	Online
	11:00 pm UTC						

15	July 19	Atlanta Reign	1	–	3	Florida Mayhem	Online
	8:30 pm UTC						

16	July 24	Atlanta Reign	3	–	1	Boston Uprising	Online
	7:00 pm UTC						

17	August 02	Atlanta Reign	3	–	1	Dallas Fuel	Online
	7:00 pm UTC						

August: 0–4

18	August 15	Atlanta Reign	2	–	3	Paris Eternal	Online
	7:00 pm UTC						

19	August 16	Atlanta Reign	1	–	3	Vancouver Titans	Online
	11:00 pm UTC						

20	August 22	Atlanta Reign	1	–	3	Los Angeles Gladiators	Online
	11:00 pm UTC						

21	August 23	Atlanta Reign	2	–	3	San Francisco Shock	Online
	9:00 pm UTC						

=== Midseason tournaments ===
2020 midseason tournaments game log
May Melee: 1–1

Knockouts	May 22	Atlanta Reign	3	–	0	Toronto Defiant	Online
	11:15 pm UTC						

Quarterfinals	May 23	Atlanta Reign	1	–	3	Florida Mayhem	Online
	9:00 pm UTC						

Summer Showdown: 0–1

Quarterfinals	July 04	Atlanta Reign	2	–	3	Toronto Defiant	Online
	9:00 pm UTC						

Countdown Cup: 1–1

Knockouts	August 07	Atlanta Reign	3	–	0	Vancouver Titans	Online
	7:00 pm UTC						

Quarterfinals	August 08	Atlanta Reign	0	–	3	Florida Mayhem	Online
	11:00 pm UTC						

Bonus wins awarded: 0

=== Postseason ===
2020 playoff game log
North America Play-ins: 1–0

Round 1	First-round bye

Round 2	September 04	Atlanta Reign	3	–	1	Boston Uprising	Online
	9:00 pm UTC						

North America Bracket: 1–2

Upper Round 1	September 06	Atlanta Reign	3	–	2	Paris Eternal	Online
	1:00 am UTC						

Upper Round 2	September 07	Atlanta Reign	1	–	3	San Francisco Shock	Online
	1:00 am UTC						

Lower Round 2	September 11	Atlanta Reign	0	–	3	Florida Mayhem	Online
	7:00 pm UTC						
