= 2020 Toronto Defiant season =

- Head coach: Félix Münch (rel. Apr 14); David Moschetto (Interim)
- General manager: Won Jae-sun
- Owner: Chris Overholt
- Conference: Atlantic
- Division: North
- Region: North America

Results
- Record: 7–14 (.333)
- Place: North America: 9th; League: 15th
- May Melee: Knockouts
- Summer Showdown: Semifinals
- Countdown Cup: Knockouts
- Season Playoffs: Did not qualify
- Total Earnings: $20,000

The 2020 Toronto Defiant season was the second season of Toronto Defiant's existence in the Overwatch League. The Defiant were scheduled to host two homestand weekends in the 2020 season at Roy Thomson Hall in the Toronto Entertainment District, but both were cancelled in light of the COVID-19 pandemic as the league transitioned to online play. The team ended the season with a 7 wins, 1 bonus win, and 14 losses. The Defiant and were knocked out of postseason contention by the Los Angeles Gladiators in the North American Play-ins bracket.

== Preceding offseason ==
=== Organizational changes ===
In early September 2019, assistant coach May "Optidox" Sims, who assisted the team with head coaching duties in 2019 after head coach Lee "Bishop" Beoum-jun was released, left the team. The following month, the team announced that former Paris Eternal head coach Félix "Féfé" Münch would be Toronto's new head coach. In late October, the team parted ways with assistant coach Sim "Mobydik" Seung-Bo and, one day later, hired David "Lilbow" Moschetto as a coach.

=== Roster changes ===
The Defiant enter the new season with no free agents, ten players which they have the option to retain for another year, and no players under contract. The OWL's deadline to exercise a team option is November 11, after which any players not retained will become a free agent. Free agency officially began on October 7.

==== Acquisitions ====
The Defiant's first offseason pick-up was on October 23, when the team acquired Young-seo "KariV" Park from the Los Angeles Valiant. A week later, KariV was joined by his former teammate, as DPS Brady "Agilities" Girardi signed with Toronto. The team signed tank Adam "Beast" Denton from Philadelphia Fusion's academy team Fusion University on October 30.

On November 4, the Defiant announced the signing of former Los Angeles Gladiators DPS player Lane "Surefour" Roberts. The following day, they signed former Boston Uprising support Kristian "Kellex" Keller. The team then picked up former San Francisco Shock flex-tank Andreas "Nevix" Karlsson on November 7.

==== Departures ====
On October 7, the Defiant announced that they would not exercise their option to retain flex tank Daniel "Gods" Graeser. The following day, they announced that they would elect to not retain DPS Hong "im37" Jin-ui, support Go "Aid" Jae-yoon, and tank Normunds "sharyk" Faterins. Their roster overhaul continued, as Toronto announced they would not pick up main tank Jo "Yakpung" Gyeong-mu's option the following week. In late October, the Defiant announced that they would also not retain Lee "Ivy" Seung-hyun, and they would not retain support Park "Neko" Se-hyeon.

== Regular season ==
=== Season start ===
The Defiant opened the season with a 3–1 win over the Paris Eternal. A subsequent close 3–2 loss to the Philadelphia Fusion marked the first loss of the season, followed by consecutive losses to the Atlanta Reign, Florida Mayhem, and Houston Outlaws. The emergence of the COVID-19 pandemic forced all OWL matches into online play, and led the league to introduce a new format involving multiple midseason tournaments: the May Melee, Summer Showdown, and Countdown Cup.

Head coach Féfé announced his retirement from professional Overwatch for personal reasons on April 14, 2020. Assistant coach David "Lilbow" Moschetto was promoted to interim head coach in his place.

=== May Melee ===
May was marked with several roster changes for the Defiant. On May 1, 2020, support player Kellex announced his retirement from professional Overwatch. The team signed Harrison "Kruise" Pond from the Paris Eternal to fill his role; due to the constraints of the ongoing pandemic, Kruise competed for the Defiant from the Paris Eternal team house. Damage player Mangachu transitioned to a full-time coaching role on May 13, 2020. Toronto also signed damage player Thomas "zYKK" Hosono to a 14-day contract on May 22, 2020.

Toronto entered the May Melee as the 12th seed, facing off with the retooled Vancouver Titans in a qualification match they won 3–2. However, the Defiant were promptly swept by the Atlanta Reign 3–0 and eliminated from the tournament.

=== Summer Showdown ===
On June 2, 2020, the Defiant announced the signing of tank player Seb "numlocked" Barton, initially as an assistant coach but then as a player. Barton had formerly been signed to the Los Angeles Valiant, but had been released by the Valiant at the end of the 2017-2018 season. The team primarily fielded numlocked as the starting main tank for the remainder of the season over Beast.

General Manager Jae-sun Won announced his departure from the Defiant and retirement from professional Overwatch on June 7, 2020.

The Defiant entered the Summer Showdown as the 11th seed, and were selected by the fifth-seeded Los Angeles Valiant for their knockout stage matchup. However, with the prevailing Genji-focused metagame at the time, ushered in by buffs to the hero's abilities prior to the tournament, the Defiant were able to best the Valiant 3–1 with former Valiant player Agilities' Genji as the centrepiece. The Defiant narrowly defeated the Atlanta Reign 3–2 in the subsequent quarterfinal, before falling 3–0 at the hands of the Philadelphia Fusion in the tournament semifinals.

On June 21, 2020, the team announced that zYKK had been upgraded to a long-term contract.

=== Countdown Cup ===
Toronto entered the Countdown Cup as the eighth seed following victories over the Washington Justice and Vancouver Titans, 3–0 and 3–2, respectively, but were knocked out in the first round by the Los Angeles Gladiators, 3–2.

== Postseason ==
Leading up to the playoffs, Toronto lost back-to-back games to the San Francisco Shock and Dallas Fuel, entering the playoffs as the ninth seed. The team went up against the sixth-seeded Los Angeles Gladiators once more in their first match-up and lost 3–2 to end their season.

== Roster ==
2020 Toronto Defiant roster
Players
Coaches

Role	No.	Handle	Name	Nationality
Damage	22	Logix	Berghmans, Andreas	Belgium
Damage	51	Mangachu	Campbell, Liam	Canada
Damage	9	Agilities	Girardi, Brady	Canada
Damage	10	zYKK	Hosono, Thomas	France
Damage	4	Surefour	Roberts, Lane	Canada
Tank	3	Beast	Denton, Adam	United States
Tank	28	numlocked	Barton, Seb	United Kingdom
Tank	6	Nevix	Karlsson, Andreas	Sweden
Support	7	RoKy	Park Joo-seong	South Korea
Support	18	Kruise	Pond, Harrison	United Kingdom
Support	8	KariV	Park Young-seo	South Korea

Head coach

- David "Lilbow" Moschetto

Legend:
- (I) Inactive
- (S) Suspended
- (2W) Two-way player
- Substitute
- (injured) Injury / Illness

Latest roster transaction: June 3, 2020.

=== Transactions ===
Transactions of/for players on the roster during the 2020 regular season:

- On May 1, support Kristian "Kellex" Keller retired.
- On May 2, the Defiant acquired support Harrison "Kruise" Pond from the Paris Eternal.
- On May 22, the Defiant signed DPS Thomas "zYKK" Hosono to a 14-day contract.
- On June 2, the Defiant signed tank Seb "numlocked" Barton.
- On June 21, the Defiant extended Thomas "zYKK" Hosono to a long-term contract.

== Standings ==
Pos	Con	Team	Pld	W	BW	L	PCT	MW	ML	MT	MD	Qualification
1	ATL	Philadelphia Fusion	21	19	5	2	0.905	59	19	0	+40	Advance to playoffs
2	PAC	San Francisco Shock	21	18	7	3	0.857	56	17	2	+39	Advance to playoffs
3	ATL	Paris Eternal	21	15	4	6	0.714	50	31	0	+19	Advance to playoffs
4	ATL	Florida Mayhem	21	14	3	7	0.667	48	30	0	+18	Advance to playoffs
5	PAC	Los Angeles Valiant	21	11	1	10	0.524	41	41	0	0	Advance to playoffs
6	PAC	Los Angeles Gladiators	21	11	0	10	0.524	43	39	5	+4	Advance to play-ins
7	ATL	Atlanta Reign	21	10	0	11	0.476	43	35	0	+8	Advance to play-ins
8	PAC	Dallas Fuel	21	9	0	12	0.429	35	44	0	−9	Advance to play-ins
9	ATL	Toronto Defiant	21	7	1	14	0.333	32	48	0	−16	Advance to play-ins
10	ATL	Houston Outlaws	21	6	0	15	0.286	32	50	3	−18	Advance to play-ins
11	PAC	Vancouver Titans	21	6	0	15	0.286	23	48	0	−25	Advance to play-ins
12	ATL	Washington Justice	21	4	0	17	0.190	21	54	1	−33	Advance to play-ins
13	ATL	Boston Uprising	21	2	0	19	0.095	14	61	4	−47	Advance to play-ins

Source: The Overwatch League
Rules for classification: 1) Wins plus bonus wins 2) winning percentage (excluding bonus wins); 3) map differential; 4) head-to-head record; 5) head-to-head map differential

== Game log ==
=== Regular season ===
2020 game log (Regular season record: 7–14)
February–April: 4–5

1	February 08	Toronto Defiant	3	–	1	Paris Eternal	New York City, NY
	1:00 pm EST						Hammerstein Ballroom
		0	Lijiang Tower			2	
		4	Eichenwalde			3	
		3	Horizon Lunar Colony			2	
		3	Havana			0	

2	February 23	Toronto Defiant	2	–	3	Philadelphia Fusion	Washington, DC
	5:00 pm EST						The Anthem
		0	Oasis			2	
		1	Temple of Anubis			2	
		2	Dorado			1	
		6	King's Row			5	
		0	Nepal			2	

3	February 29	Toronto Defiant	0	–	3	Atlanta Reign	Houston, TX
	5:00 pm EST						Revention Music Center
		0	Nepal			2	
		0	Blizzard World			1	
		1	Temple of Anubis			2	

4	March 01	Toronto Defiant	1	–	3	Houston Outlaws	Houston, TX
	7:00 pm EST						Revention Music Center
		2	Nepal			1	
		3	King's Row			4	
		0	Horizon Lunar Colony			1	
		1	Dorado			2	

5	March 07	Toronto Defiant	1	–	3	Florida Mayhem	Washington, DC
	3:00 pm EST						The Anthem
		2	Busan			1	
		0	Junkertown			1	
		1	Blizzard World			2	
		0	Hanamura			1	

6	March 28	Toronto Defiant	3	–	1	Boston Uprising	Online
	8:00 pm UTC						

7	April 04	Toronto Defiant	3	–	1	Washington Justice	Online
	8:00 pm UTC						

8	April 12	Toronto Defiant	2	–	3	Houston Outlaws	Online
	8:00 pm UTC						

9	April 18	Toronto Defiant	3	–	1	Boston Uprising	Online
	1:00 am UTC						

May Melee qualifiers: 0–3

10	May 03	Toronto Defiant	1	–	3	Los Angeles Gladiators	Online
	11:00 pm UTC						

11	May 10	Toronto Defiant	1	–	3	San Francisco Shock	Online
	9:00 pm UTC						

12	May 17	Toronto Defiant	2	–	3	Los Angeles Valiant	Online
	11:00 pm UTC						

Summer Showdown qualifiers: 1–2

13	June 14	Toronto Defiant	3	–	0	Vancouver Titans	Online
	9:00 pm UTC						

14	June 20	Toronto Defiant	0	–	3	Atlanta Reign	Online
	9:00 pm UTC						

15	June 27	Toronto Defiant	0	–	3	Dallas Fuel	Online
	9:00 pm UTC						

Countdown Cup qualifiers: 2–2

16	July 18	Toronto Defiant	3	–	0	Washington Justice	Online
	9:00 pm UTC						

17	July 19	Toronto Defiant	0	–	3	Paris Eternal	Online
	7:00 pm UTC						

18	July 26	Toronto Defiant	0	–	3	Philadelphia Fusion	Online
	9:00 pm UTC						

19	August 01	Toronto Defiant	3	–	2	Vancouver Titans	Online
	9:00 pm UTC						

August: 0–2

20	August 16	Toronto Defiant	0	–	3	San Francisco Shock	Online
	7:00 pm UTC						

21	August 22	Toronto Defiant	1	–	3	Dallas Fuel	Online
	9:00 pm UTC						

=== Midseason tournaments ===
2020 midseason tournaments game log
May Melee: 1–1

Qualifier match	May 22	Toronto Defiant	3	–	2	Vancouver Titans	Online
	5:00 pm UTC						

Knockouts	May 22	Toronto Defiant	0	–	3	Atlanta Reign	Online
	11:15 pm UTC						

Summer Showdown: 2–1

Knockouts	July 03	Toronto Defiant	3	–	1	Los Angeles Valiant	Online
	11:00 pm UTC						

Quarterfinals	July 04	Toronto Defiant	3	–	2	Atlanta Reign	Online
	9:00 pm UTC						

Semifinals	July 05	Toronto Defiant	0	–	3	Philadelphia Fusion	Online
	8:00 pm UTC						

Countdown Cup: 0–1

Knockouts	August 08	Toronto Defiant	2	–	3	Los Angeles Gladiators	Online
	1:00 am UTC						

Bonus wins awarded: 1

=== Postseason ===
2020 playoff game log
North America Play-ins: 0–1

Round 1	First-round bye

Round 2	September 04	Toronto Defiant	2	–	3	Los Angeles Gladiators	Online
	7:00 pm UTC						

== Awards ==
Agilities, Kariv, and Nevix were selected to play in the 2020 All-Star Game. Logix, while not selected as an all-star, was invited to the Widowmaker 1v1 tournament during All-Star weekend.
