= 2020 Boston Uprising season =

- Head coach: Vytis "Mineral" Lasaitis
- Owner: Robert Kraft
- Conference: Atlantic
- Division: North
- Region: North America

Results
- Record: 2–19 (.095)
- Place: North America: 13th; League: 20th
- May Melee: Did not qualifty
- Summer Showdown: Knockouts
- Countdown Cup: Did not qualify
- Season Playoffs: Did not qualify
- Total Earnings: $0

The 2020 Boston Uprising season was the third season of Boston Uprising's existence in the Overwatch League and their first under head coach Vytis "Mineral" Lasaitis. Boston planned to host two homestand weekends in the 2020 season at Citizens Bank Opera House in Boston, but all homestand matches were canceled due to the COVID-19 pandemic.

The Uprising qualified for one midseason tournament, the Summer Showdown, in the 2020 season but were eliminated by the Washington Justice in the knockouts round. The Uprising ended the season with 2 wins and 19 losses in the regular season and were eliminated from postseason contention after losing to the Atlanta Reign in the North America Play-in tournament.

== Preceding offseason ==
=== Organizational changes ===
In September 2019, Boston announced that former Florida Mayhem head coach Vytis "Mineral" Lasaitis would be the fill the team's head coach vacancy, which had been empty for over a year. A month later, the Uprising released assistant coaches Jordan "Gunba" Graham and Jackson "Shake" Kaplan; the team signed Ilias "iLka" Kaskanetas, who had most recently been the head coach of European Overwatch Contenders team Angry Titans, as an assistant coach. On December 9, the team signed former HSL Esports support player Valentin "Ascoft" Wulfman as an assistant coach.

=== Roster changes ===
Free agents
Role	Player		Contract status	Date signed	2020 team
Role	Handle	Name	Contract status	Date signed	2020 team
Support	Aimgod	Min-Seok Kwon	Free agent	November 8	Washington Justice
Support	Kellex	Kristian Keller	Free agent	November 5	Toronto Defiant
Legend Re-signed/Retained by the Uprising. Departed from the Uprising.

The Uprising enter the new season with two free agents, four players which they have the option to retain for another year, and four players under contract. The OWL's deadline to exercise a team option is November 11, after which any players not retained will become a free agent. Free agency officially began on October 7.

==== Acquisitions ====
Boston made their first offseason acquisitions on October 28, when they signed support Seo "Myunbong" Sang-min and DPS Min "Jerry" Tae-hui from Korean Contenders teams from O2 Blast and Meta Athena, respectively. On November 7, Boston promoted support Gabriel "Swimmer" Levy and off-tank Walid "Mouffin" Bassal from their academy team, Uprising Academy. While Swimmer was promoted to play strictly for Boston, Mouffin was put on a two-way contract. On November 21, Uprising signed former Seoul Dynasty DPS Sang-Beom "Munchkin" Byun, and a day later, they signed tank Thomas "brussen" Brussen.

==== Departures ====
The Uprising announced on October 21 that they would not elect to retain all four of their players with a team option – support Yang "Persia" Zion, support Renan "alemao" Moretto, off-tank Richard "rCk" Kanerva, and DPS Lee "Stellar" Do-hyung. Additionally, they also announced the same day that they would not re-sign either of their free agents – Kwon "AimGod" Min-seok and Kristian "Kellex" Keller. The following day, the team transferred DPS Jeffrey "blasé" Tsang to the Houston Outlaws.

== Roster ==
2020 Boston Uprising roster
Players
Coaches

Role	No.	Handle	Name	Nationality
Damage	17	Colourhex	Birse, Kelsey	New Zealand
Damage	1	Jerry	Min Tae-hui	South Korea
Tank	10	Axxiom (I)	Park Min-seob	South Korea
Tank	25	Fusions	Bosworth, Cameron	United Kingdom
Tank	3	mikeyy	Konicki, Michael	United States
Tank	5	Punk	Gilchrist, Leyton	Australia
Support	24	Halo	Hamand, Haley	United States
Support	13	Myunbong	Seo Sang-min	South Korea

Head coach

- Vytis "Mineral" Lasaitis

Legend:
- (I) Inactive
- (S) Suspended
- (2W) Two-way player
- Substitute
- (injured) Injury / Illness

Latest roster transaction: May 21, 2020.

=== Transactions ===
Transactions of/for players on the roster during the 2020 regular season:

- On March 2, the Uprising released DPS Byun "Munchkin" Sang-beom.
- On March 3, the Uprising signed support Haley "Halo" Hamand.
- On April 4, the Uprising released tank Walid "Mouffin" Bassal.
- On April 14, the Uprising released support Gabriel "Swimmer" Levy.
- On May 11, the Uprising signed tank Leyton "Punk" Gilchrist.
- On May 12, tank Thomas "brussen" Brussen retired.
- On May 21, the Uprising signed tank Michael "mikey" Konicki.

== Standings ==
Pos	Con	Team	Pld	W	BW	L	PCT	MW	ML	MT	MD	Qualification
1	ATL	Philadelphia Fusion	21	19	5	2	0.905	59	19	0	+40	Advance to playoffs
2	PAC	San Francisco Shock	21	18	7	3	0.857	56	17	2	+39	Advance to playoffs
3	ATL	Paris Eternal	21	15	4	6	0.714	50	31	0	+19	Advance to playoffs
4	ATL	Florida Mayhem	21	14	3	7	0.667	48	30	0	+18	Advance to playoffs
5	PAC	Los Angeles Valiant	21	11	1	10	0.524	41	41	0	0	Advance to playoffs
6	PAC	Los Angeles Gladiators	21	11	0	10	0.524	43	39	5	+4	Advance to play-ins
7	ATL	Atlanta Reign	21	10	0	11	0.476	43	35	0	+8	Advance to play-ins
8	PAC	Dallas Fuel	21	9	0	12	0.429	35	44	0	−9	Advance to play-ins
9	ATL	Toronto Defiant	21	7	1	14	0.333	32	48	0	−16	Advance to play-ins
10	ATL	Houston Outlaws	21	6	0	15	0.286	32	50	3	−18	Advance to play-ins
11	PAC	Vancouver Titans	21	6	0	15	0.286	23	48	0	−25	Advance to play-ins
12	ATL	Washington Justice	21	4	0	17	0.190	21	54	1	−33	Advance to play-ins
13	ATL	Boston Uprising	21	2	0	19	0.095	14	61	4	−47	Advance to play-ins

Source: The Overwatch League
Rules for classification: 1) Wins plus bonus wins 2) winning percentage (excluding bonus wins); 3) map differential; 4) head-to-head record; 5) head-to-head map differential

== Game log ==
=== Regular season ===
2020 game log (Regular season record: 2–19)
February–April: 1–8

1	February 09	Boston Uprising	0	–	3	New York Excelsior	New York City, NY
	3:00 pm EST						Hammerstein Ballroom
		0	Oasis			2	
		1	Blizzard World			2	
		2	Temple of Anubis			3	

2	February 22	Boston Uprising	3	–	2	Houston Outlaws	Washington, DC
	5:00 pm EST						The Anthem
		2	Ilios			0	
		2	Temple of Anubis			2	
		3	Dorado			1	
		3	Blizzard World			3	
		0	Oasis			2	
		1	Nepal			2	
		2	Lijiang Tower			0	

3	March 01	Boston Uprising	0	–	3	Philadelphia Fusion	Houston, TX
	1:00 pm EST						Revention Music Center
		0	Lijiang Tower			2	
		1	King's Row			2	
		1	Hanamura			2	

4	March 07	Boston Uprising	1	–	3	Washington Justice	Washington, DC
	7:00 pm EST						The Anthem
		2	Busan			0	
		1	Havana			2	
		2	Eichenwalde			3	
		1	Horizon Lunar Colony			2	

5	March 08	Boston Uprising	0	–	3	Atlanta Reign	Washington, DC
	7:00 pm EDT						The Anthem
		0	Oasis			2	
		1	Havana			2	
		2	Eichenwalde			3	

6	March 28	Boston Uprising	1	–	3	Toronto Defiant	Online
	8:00 pm UTC						

7	April 11	Boston Uprising	1	–	3	Houston Outlaws	Online
	10:00 pm UTC						

8	April 18	Boston Uprising	1	–	3	Toronto Defiant	Online
	1:00 am UTC						

9	April 26	Boston Uprising	0	–	3	Florida Mayhem	Online
	8:00 pm UTC						

May Melee qualifiers: 1–2

10	May 03	Boston Uprising	0	–	3	Florida Mayhem	Online
	9:00 pm UTC						

11	May 10	Boston Uprising	0	–	3	Los Angeles Valiant	Online
	1:00 am UTC						

12	May 16	Boston Uprising	3	–	2	Los Angeles Gladiators	Online
	10:30 pm UTC						

Summer Showdown qualifiers: 0–3

13	June 13	Boston Uprising	2	–	3	Paris Eternal	Online
	7:00 pm UTC						

14	June 21	Boston Uprising	0	–	3	Philadelphia Fusion	Online
	7:00 pm UTC						

15	June 27	Boston Uprising	0	–	3	Vancouver Titans	Online
	11:00 pm UTC						

Countdown Cup qualifiers: 0–4

16	July 18	Boston Uprising	0	–	3	San Francisco Shock	Online
	10:00 pm UTC						

17	July 19	Boston Uprising	0	–	3	Los Angeles Valiant	Online
	10:00 pm UTC						

18	July 24	Boston Uprising	1	–	3	Atlanta Reign	Online
	7:00 pm UTC						

19	July 25	Boston Uprising	1	–	3	Dallas Fuel	Online
	11:00 pm UTC						

August: 0–2

20	August 15	Boston Uprising	0	–	3	Los Angeles Gladiators	Online
	11:00 pm UTC						

21	August 21	Boston Uprising	0	–	3	Vancouver Titans	Online
	7:00 pm UTC						

=== Midseason tournaments ===
2020 midseason tournaments game log
May Melee: 0–1

Qualifying match	May 23	Boston Uprising	2	–	3	Paris Eternal	Online
	1:00 am UTC						

Summer Showdown: 0–1

Knockouts	June 28	Boston Uprising	1	–	3	Washington Justice	Online
	11:30 pm UTC						

Countdown Cup: 0–1

Qualifying match	August 02	Boston Uprising	0	–	3	Vancouver Titans	Online
	11:30 pm UTC						

Bonus wins awarded: 0

=== Postseason ===
2020 playoff game log
North America Play-ins: 1–1

Round 1	September 03	Boston Uprising	3	–	1	Houston Outlaws	Online
	7:00 pm UTC						

Round 2	September 04	Boston Uprising	1	–	3	Atlanta Reign	Online
	9:00 pm UTC						
