= 2020 Vancouver Titans season =

- Head coach: Hwang Ji-sub (rel. April 30); Steven Coronel
- Owner: Francesco Aquilini
- Arena(s): Rogers Arena
- Conference: Pacific
- Division: West
- Region: North America

Results
- Record: 6–15 (.286)
- Place: North America: 11th; League: 18th
- May Melee: Did not qualify
- Summer Showdown: Quarterfinals
- Countdown Cup: Knockouts
- Season Playoffs: Did not qualify
- Total Earnings: $0

The 2020 Vancouver Titans season was the second season of Vancouver Titans's existence in the Overwatch League. The team entered the season as the defending Pacific Conference (previously titled Pacific Division) champions looking to bounce back after their 2019 Grand Finals loss to the San Francisco Shock. The Titans planned to host two homestand weekends in the 2020 season at the Rogers Arena in Downtown Vancouver, but all homestand events were canceled due to the COVID-19 pandemic.

On April 30, the Titans parted ways with head coach Hwang "paJion" Ji-sub. Vancouver released its entire roster and coaching staff on May 6. Two days later, the Titans announced the hiring of Steven "Flubby" Coronel and revealed their new roster. The team struggled throughout the season, amassing a 6–15 regular season record. A 0–3 loss to the Washington Justice in the North America play-in tournament on September 3 ended the team's season.

== Preceding offseason ==
=== Roster changes ===
The Titans enter the new season with no free agents, two players which they have the option to retain for another year, and eight players under contract. The OWL's deadline to exercise a team option is November 11, after which any players not retained will become a free agent. Free agency officially began on October 7.

==== Acquisitions ====
On November 26, it was announced that main tank Baek "Fissure" Chan-hyung had come out of retirement and signed with the Titans. A day later, Vancouver announced the signing of veteran support player Ryu "ryujehong" Je-hong.

==== Departures ====
The Titan's first offseason roster change was on November 12, when the team released tank Hwang "TiZi" Jang-hyeon. Two days later, the team announced the departure of flex support Kim "Rapel" Jung-geun. On November 18, the team parted ways with DPS Lee "Hooreg" Dong-eun, as he looked to begin a coaching career in professional Overwatch. The following week, Vancouver released main tank Park "Bumper" Sang-beom.

== Roster ==
2020 Vancouver Titans roster
Players
Coaches

Role	No.	Handle	Name	Nationality
Damage	17	Dalton	Bennyhoff, Dalton	United States
Damage	10	Tsuna	Ikram, Samir	France
Damage	24	sHockWave	Jensen, Niclas	Denmark
Tank	3	ShRedLock	Shirvani, Abtin	Canada
Tank	27	KSAA	Alruwaili, Alhumaidi	Saudi Arabia
Support	6	CarCar	First, Carson	United States
Support	4	Roolf	Stark, Randal	Canada

Head coach

- Steven "Flubby" Coronel

Legend:
- (I) Inactive
- (S) Suspended
- (2W) Two-way player
- Substitute
- (injured) Injury / Illness

Latest roster transaction: May 22, 2020.

=== Transactions ===
Transactions of/for players on the roster during the 2020 regular season:

- On April 30, the Titans released tank Choi "JJANU" Hyeon-woo.
- On May 6, the Titans released DPS Kim "Haksal" Hyo-jong, DPS Seo "SeoMinSoo" Min-soo, DPS Lee "Stitch" Chung-hee, tank Baek "Fissure" Chan-hyung, tank Lee "Twilight" Joo-seok, support Ryu "ryujehong" Je-hong, and support Kim "SLIME" Sung-jun.
- On May 8, the Titans signed support Carson "CarCar" First, DPS Dalton "Dalton" Bennyhoff, tank Abtin "ShRedLock" Shirvani, support Randal "Roolf" Stark, DPS Samir "Tsuna" Ikram, and tank Alhumaidi "KSAA" Alruwaili.
- On May 22, the Titans signed DPS Niclas "SHockWave" Jensen.

== Standings ==
Pos	Con	Team	Pld	W	BW	L	PCT	MW	ML	MT	MD	Qualification
1	ATL	Philadelphia Fusion	21	19	5	2	0.905	59	19	0	+40	Advance to playoffs
2	PAC	San Francisco Shock	21	18	7	3	0.857	56	17	2	+39	Advance to playoffs
3	ATL	Paris Eternal	21	15	4	6	0.714	50	31	0	+19	Advance to playoffs
4	ATL	Florida Mayhem	21	14	3	7	0.667	48	30	0	+18	Advance to playoffs
5	PAC	Los Angeles Valiant	21	11	1	10	0.524	41	41	0	0	Advance to playoffs
6	PAC	Los Angeles Gladiators	21	11	0	10	0.524	43	39	5	+4	Advance to play-ins
7	ATL	Atlanta Reign	21	10	0	11	0.476	43	35	0	+8	Advance to play-ins
8	PAC	Dallas Fuel	21	9	0	12	0.429	35	44	0	−9	Advance to play-ins
9	ATL	Toronto Defiant	21	7	1	14	0.333	32	48	0	−16	Advance to play-ins
10	ATL	Houston Outlaws	21	6	0	15	0.286	32	50	3	−18	Advance to play-ins
11	PAC	Vancouver Titans	21	6	0	15	0.286	23	48	0	−25	Advance to play-ins
12	ATL	Washington Justice	21	4	0	17	0.190	21	54	1	−33	Advance to play-ins
13	ATL	Boston Uprising	21	2	0	19	0.095	14	61	4	−47	Advance to play-ins

Source: The Overwatch League
Rules for classification: 1) Wins plus bonus wins 2) winning percentage (excluding bonus wins); 3) map differential; 4) head-to-head record; 5) head-to-head map differential

== Game log ==
=== Regular season ===
2020 game log (Regular season record: 6–15)
February–March: 2–2

1	February 08	Los Angeles Gladiators	2	–	3	Vancouver Titans	Arlington, TX
	2:00 pm PST						Esports Stadium Arlington
		2	Nepal			1	
		2	King's Row			3	
		0	Hanamura			2	
		2	Dorado			1	
		0	Lijiang Tower			2	

2	February 09	Los Angeles Valiant	0	–	3	Vancouver Titans	Arlington, TX
	2:00 pm PST						Esports Stadium Arlington
		0	Lijiang Tower			2	
		4	Blizzard World			5	
		2	Temple of Anubis			3	

3	April 11	Vancouver Titans	0	–	3	Guangzhou Charge	Online
	10:00 am UTC						

4	April 12	Vancouver Titans	1	–	3	Chengdu Hunters	Online
	8:00 am UTC						

May Melee qualifiers: 0–4

5	May 09	Vancouver Titans	1	–	3	Washington Justice	Online
	9:00 pm UTC						

6	May 10	Vancouver Titans	0	–	3	Florida Mayhem	Online
	11:00 pm UTC						

7	May 16	Vancouver Titans	0	–	3	Houston Outlaws	Online
	7:00 pm UTC						

8	May 17	Vancouver Titans	0	–	3	Philadelphia Fusion	Online
	9:00 pm UTC						

Summer Showdown qualifiers: 2–2

9	June 14	Vancouver Titans	0	–	3	Toronto Defiant	Online
	9:00 pm UTC						

10	June 20	Vancouver Titans	3	–	0	Dallas Fuel	Online
	11:45 pm UTC						

11	June 27	Vancouver Titans	3	–	0	Boston Uprising	Online
	11:00 pm UTC						

12	June 28	Vancouver Titans	0	–	3	Atlanta Reign	Online
	9:00 pm UTC						

Countdown Cup qualifiers: 0–4

13	July 17	Vancouver Titans	0	–	3	Paris Eternal	Online
	7:00 pm UTC						

14	July 18	Vancouver Titans	0	–	3	Los Angeles Gladiators	Online
	7:00 pm UTC						

15	July 25	Vancouver Titans	0	–	3	San Francisco Shock	Online
	7:00 pm UTC						

16	August 01	Vancouver Titans	2	–	3	Toronto Defiant	Online
	9:00 pm UTC						

August: 2–3

17	August 14	Vancouver Titans	1	–	3	Florida Mayhem	Online
	7:00 pm UTC						

18	August 15	Vancouver Titans	0	–	3	Dallas Fuel	Online
	9:00 pm UTC						

19	August 16	Vancouver Titans	3	–	1	Atlanta Reign	Online
	11:00 pm UTC						

20	August 21	Vancouver Titans	3	–	0	Boston Uprising	Online
	7:00 pm UTC						

21	August 23	Vancouver Titans	0	–	3	Los Angeles Valiant	Online
	1:00 am UTC						

=== Midseason tournaments ===
2020 midseason tournaments game log
May Melee: 0–1

Qualifier match	May 22	Vancouver Titans	2	–	3	Toronto Defiant	Online
	5:00 pm UTC						

Summer Showdown: 0–1

Quarterfinals	July 04	Vancouver Titans	1	–	3	Paris Eternal	Online
	7:00 pm UTC						

Countdown Cup: 1–1

Qualifier match	August 02	Vancouver Titans	3	–	0	Boston Uprising	Online
	11:30 pm UTC						

Knockouts	August 07	Vancouver Titans	0	–	3	Atlanta Reign	Online
	7:00 pm UTC						

Bonus wins awarded: 0

=== Postseason ===
2020 playoff game log
North America Play-ins: 0–1

Round 1	September 03	Vancouver Titans	0	–	3	Washington Justice	Online
	9:10 pm UTC						
