= 2020 Los Angeles Valiant season =

- Head coach: Mike Szklanny
- Owner: Noah Whinston
- Conference: Pacific
- Division: West
- Region: North America

Results
- Record: 11–10 (.524)
- Place: North America: 5th; League: 8th
- May Melee: Semifinals
- Summer Showdown: Knockouts
- Countdown Cup: Quarterfinals
- Season Playoffs: NA Lower Round 2
- Total Earnings: $90,000

The 2020 Los Angeles Valiant season was the third season of Los Angeles Valiant's existence in the Overwatch League and their first full season under head coach Mike "Packing10" Szklanny. The Valiant planned host two homestand events in the 2020 season at The Novo, but all homestand matches were canceled due to the COVID-19 pandemic.

On August 22, the Valiant clinched a spot in the season playoffs with a win over the Vancouver Titans. In the first round of the North America bracket, Los Angeles defeated the Florida Mayhem by a score of 3–2. The following day, the Valiant were swept by the Philadelphia Fusion in the second round of the upper bracket, sending them to the lower bracket. A 1–3 loss to the Washington Justice in the subsequent round eliminated the Valiant from the playoffs.

== Preceding offseason ==
=== Organizational changes ===
After releasing head coach Moon Byung-chul the previous season, assistant coach Mike "Packing10" Szklanny was named the team's interim head coach for the remainder of the season. Packing10 was officially named the team's full-time head coach in early September 2019. The following month, the Valiant added former Boston Uprising assistant coach Jordan "Gunba" Graham as an assistant coach. Gunba was an assistant coach for the Valiant in 2018.

=== Roster changes ===
The Valiant enter the new season with no free agents, three players which they have the option to retain for another year, and five players under contract. The OWL's deadline to exercise a team option is November 11, after which any players not retained will become a free agent. Free agency officially began on October 7.

==== Acquisitions ====
The Valiant's first acquisitions of the offseason were announced on October 31, with the signings of main tank Song "Dreamer" Sang-lok from the Sydney Drop Bears, flex DPS Damon "Apply" Conti, support Owen "Slur" Warner from Samsung Morning Stars, and support Mun "Lastro" Jung-won from Skyfoxes. On January 7, the Valiant revealed two more additions in main tank Rick "GiG" Salazar and support Park "RaiN" Jae-ho in a skit video for the team's new color scheme. A week later, on January 16, the team announced the signing of damage player Kai "KSP" Collins.

==== Departures ====
The Valiant made their first offseason moves on October 23, releasing DPS Brady "Agilities" Girardi, trading off-tank Indy "SPACE" Halpern to the Los Angeles Gladiators, and trading flex support Park "KariV" Young-seo to the Toronto Defiant. In mid-November, Los Angeles announced that they had parted ways with main tank Russell "FCTFCTN" Campbell. On December 12, support player Scott "Custa" Kennedy announced that he was retiring from professional Overwatch play to join the Overwatch League as an analyst. Prior to the start of the season, Owen "Slur" Warner silently departed with the team after it was revealed that he had previously used a racial slur. He later changed his name to Provide to distance himself from his past.

== Roster ==
2020 Los Angeles Valiant roster
Players
Coaches

Role	No.	Handle	Name	Nationality
Damage	12	Shax	Nielsen, Johannes	Denmark
Damage	23	KSP	Collins, Kai	United Kingdom
Damage	27	KSF	Frandanisa, Kyle	United States
Damage	19	Apply	Conti, Damon	United States
Tank	1	Dreamer	Song Sang-lok	South Korea
Tank	13	McGravy	McGarvey, Caleb	United States
Tank	3	GiG	Salazar, Rick	United States
Support	9	Lastro	Mun Jung-won	South Korea
Support	77	RaiN	Park Jae-ho	South Korea

Head coach

- Mike "Packing10" Szklanny

Legend:
- (I) Inactive
- (S) Suspended
- (2W) Two-way player
- Substitute
- (injured) Injury / Illness

Latest roster transaction: January 27, 2020.

== Standings ==
Pos	Con	Team	Pld	W	BW	L	PCT	MW	ML	MT	MD	Qualification
1	ATL	Philadelphia Fusion	21	19	5	2	0.905	59	19	0	+40	Advance to playoffs
2	PAC	San Francisco Shock	21	18	7	3	0.857	56	17	2	+39	Advance to playoffs
3	ATL	Paris Eternal	21	15	4	6	0.714	50	31	0	+19	Advance to playoffs
4	ATL	Florida Mayhem	21	14	3	7	0.667	48	30	0	+18	Advance to playoffs
5	PAC	Los Angeles Valiant	21	11	1	10	0.524	41	41	0	0	Advance to playoffs
6	PAC	Los Angeles Gladiators	21	11	0	10	0.524	43	39	5	+4	Advance to play-ins
7	ATL	Atlanta Reign	21	10	0	11	0.476	43	35	0	+8	Advance to play-ins
8	PAC	Dallas Fuel	21	9	0	12	0.429	35	44	0	−9	Advance to play-ins
9	ATL	Toronto Defiant	21	7	1	14	0.333	32	48	0	−16	Advance to play-ins
10	ATL	Houston Outlaws	21	6	0	15	0.286	32	50	3	−18	Advance to play-ins
11	PAC	Vancouver Titans	21	6	0	15	0.286	23	48	0	−25	Advance to play-ins
12	ATL	Washington Justice	21	4	0	17	0.190	21	54	1	−33	Advance to play-ins
13	ATL	Boston Uprising	21	2	0	19	0.095	14	61	4	−47	Advance to play-ins

Source: The Overwatch League
Rules for classification: 1) Wins plus bonus wins 2) winning percentage (excluding bonus wins); 3) map differential; 4) head-to-head record; 5) head-to-head map differential

== Game log ==
=== Regular season ===
2020 game log (Regular season record: 11–10)
February–April: 2–6

1	February 8	Los Angeles Valiant	3	–	1	Dallas Fuel	Arlington, TX
	4:00 pm PST						Esports Stadium Arlington
Hosted by Dallas Fuel
		1	Lijiang Tower			2	
		2	Blizzard World			1	
		4	Horizon Lunar Colony			3	
		3	Junkertown			2	

2	February 9	Los Angeles Valiant	0	–	3	Vancouver Titans	Arlington, TX
	2:00 pm PST						Esports Stadium Arlington
Hosted by Dallas Fuel
		0	Lijiang Tower			2	
		4	Blizzard World			5	
		2	Temple of Anubis			3	

3	March 28	Los Angeles Valiant	0	–	3	Seoul Dynasty	Online
	10:00 pm UTC						

4	March 30	Los Angeles Valiant	3	–	1	San Francisco Shock	Online
	12:00 midnight UTC						

5	April 05	Los Angeles Valiant	1	–	3	San Francisco Shock	Online
	12:00 midnight UTC						

6	April 06	Los Angeles Valiant	2	–	3	Dallas Fuel	Online
	12:00 midnight UTC						

7	April 17	Los Angeles Valiant	2	–	3	Los Angeles Gladiators	Online
	1:00 am UTC						

8	April 25	Los Angeles Valiant	0	–	3	San Francisco Shock	Online
	10:00 pm UTC						

May Melee qualifiers: 3–0

9	May 02	Los Angeles Valiant	3	–	2	Atlanta Reign	Online
	9:00 pm UTC						

10	May 10	Los Angeles Valiant	3	–	0	Boston Uprising	Online
	1:00 am UTC						

11	May 17	Los Angeles Valiant	3	–	2	Toronto Defiant	Online
	11:00 pm UTC						

Summer Showdown qualifiers: 2–1

12	June 14	Los Angeles Valiant	3	–	0	Washington Justice	Online
	11:00 pm UTC						

13	June 21	Los Angeles Valiant	3	–	1	Florida Mayhem	Online
	9:00 pm UTC						

14	June 28	Los Angeles Valiant	1	–	3	Paris Eternal	Online
	7:00 pm UTC						

Countdown Cup qualifiers: 2–2

15	July 18	Los Angeles Valiant	0	–	3	Atlanta Reign	Online
	11:00 pm UTC						

16	July 19	Los Angeles Valiant	3	–	0	Boston Uprising	Online
	10:00 pm UTC						

17	July 31	Los Angeles Valiant	3	–	2	Houston Outlaws	Online
	9:00 pm UTC						

18	August 02	Los Angeles Valiant	0	–	3	Philadelphia Fusion	Online
	11:00 pm UTC						

August: 2–1

19	August 16	Los Angeles Valiant	3	–	2	Florida Mayhem	Online
	9:00 pm UTC						

20	August 23	Los Angeles Valiant	2	–	3	Los Angeles Gladiators	Online
	11:00 pm UTC						

21	August 23	Los Angeles Valiant	3	–	0	Vancouver Titans	Online
	1:00 am UTC						

=== Midseason tournaments ===
2020 midseason tournaments game log
May Melee: 1–1

Quarterfinals	May 24	Los Angeles Valiant	3	–	2	Paris Eternal	Online
	1:00 am UTC						

Semifinals	May 24	Los Angeles Valiant	0	–	3	San Francisco Shock	Online
	7:00 pm UTC						

Summer Showdown: 0–1

Knockouts	July 03	Los Angeles Valiant	1	–	3	Toronto Defiant	Online
	11:00 pm UTC						

Countdown Cup: 1–1

Knockouts	August 07	Los Angeles Valiant	3	–	0	Houston Outlaws	Online
	9:00 pm UTC						

Quarterfinals	August 09	Los Angeles Valiant	1	–	3	Paris Eternal	Online
	1:00 am UTC						

Bonus wins awarded: 1

=== Postseason ===
2020 playoff game log
North America Bracket: 1–2

Upper Round 1	September 05	Los Angeles Valiant	3	–	2	Florida Mayhem	Online
	9:00 pm UTC						

Upper Round 2	September 06	Los Angeles Valiant	0	–	3	Philadelphia Fusion	Online
	11:00 pm UTC						

Lower Round 2	September 11	Los Angeles Valiant	1	–	3	Washington Justice	Online
	9:00 pm UTC						
