= 2020 Washington Justice season =

- Head coach: Seetoh Jian Qing (rel. Jun 5); Han Seung-jun
- General manager: Analynn Dang
- Owner: Mark Ein
- Arena(s): The Anthem
- Conference: Atlantic
- Division: South
- Region: North America

Results
- Record: 4–17 (.190)
- Place: North America: 12th; League: 19th
- May Melee: Knockouts
- Summer Showdown: Quarterfinals
- Countdown Cup: Knockouts
- Season Playoffs: NA Lower Finals
- Total Earnings: $255,000

The 2020 Washington Justice season was the second season of Washington Justice's existence in the Overwatch League. The Justice planned to host a league-high five homestand weekends in the 2020 season; the first three would take place at The Anthem, while the second two would be at the Entertainment and Sports Arena. While the first two homestands at took place, all other homestand events were canceled due to the COVID-19 pandemic.

On June 5, the Justice parted ways with head coach Seetoh "JohnGalt" Jian Qing. On June 17, Washington promoted assistant coach Han "Sup7eme" Seung-jun to head coach. After finishing the regular season with a 4–17 record, the Justice swept both the Vancouver Titans and Dallas Fuel in the North America play-in tournament to qualify to the season playoffs. In their first match in the North America bracket, Washington squandered an early 2–0 lead over the San Francisco Shock and lost by a score of 2–3, sending them to the lower bracket. The following day, on September 6, the Justice swept the third-seeded Paris Eternal, 3–0. Washington continued their playoff run, taking down the fourth-seeded Florida Mayhem on September 11 and needing one more win to qualify for the Grand Finals Bracket. However, the team fell to the top-seeded Philadelphia Fusion the following day by a score of 0–3, ending their playoff run.

== Preceding offseason ==
=== Organizational changes ===
In late September 2019, the Justice parted ways with their entire coaching staff from their inaugural season, including head coach Kim "WizardHyeong" Hyeong-seok. The team signed Seetoh "JohnGalt" Jian Qing, who was an assistant coach for the Los Angeles Gladiators, as their new head coach in October. Washington added two more coaches to their staff on November 8, with the hiring of former Hangzhou Spark assistant coach Han "Sup7eme" Seung-jun as a development coach and former XL2 Academy coach Lee "Wiz" Hae-joon as a strategic coach. A month later, on December 5, the Justice signed former Houston Outlaws support player Chris "Bani" Banell as an assistant coach.

=== Roster changes ===
Free agents
Role	Player		Contract status	Date signed	2020 team
Role	Handle	Name	Contract status	Date signed	2020 team
Damage	Ado	Gi-Hyeon Chon	Free agent	–	–
Support	Ark	Yeon-Jun Hong	Free agent	October 31	Washington Justice
Support	Hyeonu	Hyeon-Woo Jo	Free agent	–	–
Tank	Janus	Joon-Hwa Song	Free agent	–	–
Tank	Sansam	Hyang-Gi Kim	Free agent	–	–
Support	Sleepy	Nikola Andrews	Free agent	–	–
Legend Re-signed/Retained by the Justice. Departed from the Justice.

The Justice enter the new season with six free agents, two players which they have the option to retain for another year, and three players under contract. The OWL's deadline to exercise a team option is November 11, after which any players not retained will become a free agent. Free agency officially began on October 7.

==== Acquisitions ====
The Justice's first offseason acquisition was on October 18, when they agreed to acquire main tank Gye "rOar" Chang-hoon from the Los Angeles Gladiators, pending approval from the league. The team made their first signing on October 23 in flex DPS Lee "TTuba" Ho-sung. On November 7, Washington signed former Boston Uprising flex support Kwon "AimGod" Min-seok.

==== Departures ====
On October 7, the Justice announced that they would not re-sign free agents main tank Song "Janus" Joon-hwa, off-tank Kim "SanSam" Hyang-gi, DPS Chon "Ado" Gi-Hyeon, and support Jo "Hyeonu" Hyeon-woo. Days later, they announced that they would not re-sign support Nikola "Sleepy" Andrews, and they would not exercise their option to retain flex support Mun "Gido" Gi-do.

== Roster ==
2020 Washington Justice roster
Players
Coaches

Role	No.	Handle	Name	Nationality
Damage	22	Stitch	Lee Chung-hee	South Korea
Damage	18	Decay	Jang Gui-un	South Korea
Damage	21	TTuba	Lee Ho-sung	South Korea
Tank	37	rOar	Gye Chang-hoon	South Korea
Tank	14	JJANU	Choi Hyeon-woo	South Korea
Support	0	ArK	Hong Yeon-jun	South Korea
Support	31	AimGod	Kwon Min-seok	South Korea

Head coach

- Han "Sup7eme" Seung-jun

Legend:
- (I) Inactive
- (S) Suspended
- (2W) Two-way player
- Substitute
- (injured) Injury / Illness

Latest roster transaction: September 1, 2020.

=== Transactions ===
Transactions of/for players on the roster during the 2020 regular season:

- On May 8, DPS Corey "Corey" Nigra and DPS Ethan "Stratus" Yankel retired.
- On May 16, the Justice signed DPS Lee "Stitch" Choong-hui and tank Choi "JJANU" Hyeon-woo on 14-day contracts.
- On May 22, the Justice signed tank Choi "JJANU" Hyeon-woo to a long-term contract.
- On June 1, the Justice signed DPS Lee "Stitch" Choong-hui to a long-term contract.
- On June 4, the Justice released tank Elliot "ELLIVOTE" Vaneryd.
- On August 12, the Justice signed DPS Jang "Decay" Gui-un.
- On September 1, the Justice released tank Lukas "LullSiSH" Wiklund.

== Standings ==
Pos	Con	Team	Pld	W	BW	L	PCT	MW	ML	MT	MD	Qualification
1	ATL	Philadelphia Fusion	21	19	5	2	0.905	59	19	0	+40	Advance to playoffs
2	PAC	San Francisco Shock	21	18	7	3	0.857	56	17	2	+39	Advance to playoffs
3	ATL	Paris Eternal	21	15	4	6	0.714	50	31	0	+19	Advance to playoffs
4	ATL	Florida Mayhem	21	14	3	7	0.667	48	30	0	+18	Advance to playoffs
5	PAC	Los Angeles Valiant	21	11	1	10	0.524	41	41	0	0	Advance to playoffs
6	PAC	Los Angeles Gladiators	21	11	0	10	0.524	43	39	5	+4	Advance to play-ins
7	ATL	Atlanta Reign	21	10	0	11	0.476	43	35	0	+8	Advance to play-ins
8	PAC	Dallas Fuel	21	9	0	12	0.429	35	44	0	−9	Advance to play-ins
9	ATL	Toronto Defiant	21	7	1	14	0.333	32	48	0	−16	Advance to play-ins
10	ATL	Houston Outlaws	21	6	0	15	0.286	32	50	3	−18	Advance to play-ins
11	PAC	Vancouver Titans	21	6	0	15	0.286	23	48	0	−25	Advance to play-ins
12	ATL	Washington Justice	21	4	0	17	0.190	21	54	1	−33	Advance to play-ins
13	ATL	Boston Uprising	21	2	0	19	0.095	14	61	4	−47	Advance to play-ins

Source: The Overwatch League
Rules for classification: 1) Wins plus bonus wins 2) winning percentage (excluding bonus wins); 3) map differential; 4) head-to-head record; 5) head-to-head map differential

== Game log ==
=== Regular season ===
2020 game log (Regular season record: 4–17)
February–April: 2–8

1	February 15	Washington Justice	1	–	3	Philadelphia Fusion	Philadelphia, PA
	6:00 pm EST						The Met Philadelphia
		1	Nepal			2	
		2	Havana			1	
		2	King's Row			3	
		1	Temple of Anubis			3	

2	February 16	Washington Justice	3	–	0	Houston Outlaws	Philadelphia, PA
	4:00 pm EST						The Met Philadelphia
		2	Lijiang Tower			0	
		3	Junkertown			1	
		3	King's Row			2	

3	February 22	Paris Eternal	3	–	1	Washington Justice	Washington, DC
	7:00 pm EST						The Anthem
		2	Ilios			1	
		1	Temple of Anubis			2	
		2	Junkertown			1	
		3	Blizzard World			2	

4	February 23	London Spitfire	3	–	2	Washington Justice	Washington, DC
	7:00 pm EST						The Anthem
		0	Oasis			2	
		1	Hanamura			2	
		1	Dorado			0	
		3	Blizzard World			0	
		2	Nepal			1	

5	March 07	Boston Uprising	1	–	3	Washington Justice	Washington, DC
	7:00 pm EST						The Anthem
		2	Busan			0	
		1	Havana			2	
		2	Eichenwalde			3	
		1	Horizon Lunar Colony			2	

6	March 08	New York Excelsior	3	–	1	Washington Justice	Washington, DC
	5:00 pm EDT						The Anthem
		0	Nepal			2	
		3	Dorado			2	
		3	King's Row			1	
		1	Horizon Lunar Colony			0	

7	April 04	Washington Justice	1	–	3	Toronto Defiant	Online
	8:00 pm UTC						

8	April 05	Washington Justice	0	–	3	Philadelphia Fusion	Online
	10:00 pm UTC						

9	April 12	Washington Justice	0	–	3	Dallas Fuel	Online
	12:00 midnight UTC						

10	April 16	Washington Justice	0	–	3	Atlanta Reign	Online
	11:00 pm UTC						

May Melee qualifiers: 1–2

11	May 02	Washington Justice	0	–	3	Dallas Fuel	Online
	7:00 pm UTC						

12	May 09	Washington Justice	3	–	1	Vancouver Titans	Online
	9:00 pm UTC						

13	May 16	Washington Justice	1	–	3	Florida Mayhem	Online
	9:00 pm UTC						

Summer Showdown qualifiers: 0–3

14	June 14	Washington Justice	0	–	3	Los Angeles Valiant	Online
	11:00 pm UTC						

15	June 21	Washington Justice	0	–	3	San Francisco Shock	Online
	10:25 pm UTC						

16	June 28	Washington Justice	1	–	3	Los Angeles Gladiators	Online
	1:00 am UTC						

Countdown Cup qualifiers: 1–3

17	July 18	Washington Justice	0	–	3	Toronto Defiant	Online
	9:00 pm UTC						

18	July 25	Washington Justice	0	–	3	Florida Mayhem	Online
	9:00 pm UTC						

19	July 26	Washington Justice	3	–	1	Houston Outlaws	Online
	11:00 pm UTC						

20	August 01	Washington Justice	1	–	3	Paris Eternal	Online
	7:00 pm UTC						

August: 0–1

21	August 22	Washington Justice	0	–	3	San Francisco Shock	Online
	7:00 pm UTC						

=== Midseason tournaments ===
2020 midseason tournaments game log
May Melee: 0–1

Knockouts	May 22	Washington Justice	0	–	3	Los Angeles Gladiators	Online
	10:00 pm UTC						

Summer Showdown: 2–1

Qualifier match	June 28	Washington Justice	3	–	1	Boston Uprising	Online
	11:30 pm UTC						

Knockouts	July 04	Washington Justice	3	–	1	Los Angeles Gladiators	Online
	1:00 am UTC						

Quarterfinals	July 04	Washington Justice	0	–	3	San Francisco Shock	Online
	11:00 pm UTC						

Countdown Cup: 0–1

Knockouts	August 07	Washington Justice	2	–	3	Dallas Fuel	Online
	11:00 pm UTC						

Bonus wins awarded: 0

=== Postseason ===
2020 playoff game log
North America Play-ins: 2–0

Round 1	September 03	Washington Justice	3	–	0	Vancouver Titans	Online
	9:10 pm UTC						

Round 2	September 04	Washington Justice	3	–	0	Dallas Fuel	Online
	11:00 pm UTC						

North America Bracket: 3–2

Upper Round 1	September 05	Washington Justice	2	–	3	San Francisco Shock	Online
	11:00 pm UTC						

Lower Round 1	September 06	Washington Justice	3	–	0	Paris Eternal	Online
	9:00 pm UTC						

Lower Round 2	September 11	Washington Justice	3	–	1	Los Angeles Valiant	Online
	9:00 pm UTC						

Lower Round 3	September 12	Washington Justice	3	–	0	Florida Mayhem	Online
	9:00 pm UTC						

Lower Finals	September 13	Washington Justice	0	–	3	Philadelphia Fusion	Online
	7:00 pm UTC						
