= 2020 Los Angeles Gladiators season =

- Head coach: David "dpei" Pei
- General manager: David "dpei" Pei
- Owner: Stan Kroenke; Josh Kroenke
- Conference: Pacific
- Division: West
- Region: North America

Results
- Record: 11–10 (.524)
- Place: North America: 6th; League: 9th
- May Melee: Quarterfinals
- Summer Showdown: Knockouts
- Countdown Cup: Quarterfinals
- Season Playoffs: NA Lower Round 1
- Total Earnings: $85,000

The 2020 Los Angeles Gladiators season was the third season of Los Angeles Gladiators's existence in the Overwatch League and their third season under head coach David "dpei" Pei. The Gladiators planned to host two homestand weekends in the 2020 season, but all homestand matches were canceled due to the COVID-19 pandemic.

The Gladiators finished the season with 11 wins and 10 losses to claim the sixth seed in the North America region. On September 4, Los Angeles advanced to the season playoffs after 3–2 win over the Toronto Defiant in the North American Play-in tournament. In the first round of the North American playoffs, the Gladiators were swept by the Philadelphia Fusion, sending them to the lower bracket. They lost to the Florida Mayhem in the first round of the lower bracket, which eliminated them from the playoffs.

== Preceding offseason ==
=== Organizational changes ===
In September 2019, both head coach David "dpei" Pei and assistant coach Seetoh "JohnGalt" Jian Qing announced that their contracts lapsed with the Gladiators and were seeking other opportunities. The following month, JohnGalt signed with the Washington Justice's as their new head coach, while Pei signed a new contract with the Gladiators as their head coach and general manager. The team signed former Guangzhou Charge assistant coach Rohit "Curryshot" Nathani to their coaching staff in late October.

=== Roster changes ===
Free agents
Role	Player		Contract status	Date signed	2020 team
Role	Handle	Name	Contract status	Date signed	2020 team
Damage	Hydration	João Pedro Goes Telles	Free agent	October 18	Houston Outlaws
Damage	Surefour	Lane Roberts	Free agent	November 4	Toronto Defiant
Tank	Void	Jun-Woo Kang	Free agent	November 25	Shanghai Dragons
Legend Re-signed/Retained by the Gladiators. Departed from the Gladiators.

The Gladiators enter the new season with three free agents, six players which they have the option to retain for another year, and no players under contract. The OWL's deadline to exercise a team option is November 11, after which any players not retained will become a free agent. Free agency officially began on October 7.

==== Acquisitions ====
The Gladiators' first offseason pick-up was off-tank Indy "SPACE" Halpern, who they acquired from the Los Angeles Valiant on October 23. In early November, former London Spitfire DPS Kim "birdring" Ji-Hyeok signed with the team. Later that month, the team signed DPS Chris "MirroR" Trinh from Boston Uprising's academy team Uprising Academy and added former Mayhem Academy support player Nolan "Paintbrush" Edwards.

After the Gladiators traded off-tank Aaron "Bischu" Kim to the Guangzhou Charge in the middle of the 2019 season, Bischu re-signed to the Gladiators from free agency on November 15. A month later, on December 5, Los Angeles signed former Paris Eternal main tank Roni "LhCloudy" Tiihonen. The team announced their final signing of the offseason on December 12, with the addition of DPS Jason "Jaru" White from Team Envy.

==== Departures ====
On October 18, the Gladiators agreed to transfer main tank Gye "rOar" Chang-hoon to the Washington Justice, pending approval from the league.

DPS João Pedro "Hydration" Goes Telles, who had been with the team since its inception in 2017, was the first of the Gladiators' free agents to leave the team, signing with the Houston Outlaws on October 18. Following him was DPS Lane "Surefour" Roberts, as he signed with the Toronto Defiant the following month. On November 25, off-tank free agent Kang "Void" Jun-woo signed with the Shanghai Dragons. It was confirmed on December 5, after the disbandment of their academy team Gladiators Legion, that two-way tank player Lee "Panker" Byung-ho's option was not picked up for the 2020 season.

==== Player trades ====
The Gladiators' first player-for-player trade of the offseason took place on October 29, when they traded flex DPS Jang "Decay" Gui-un to the Dallas Fuel in exchange for main tank Son "OGE" Min-seok.

== Roster ==
2020 Los Angeles Gladiators roster
Players
Coaches

Role	No.	Handle	Name	Nationality
Damage	20	birdring	Kim Ji-hyeok	South Korea
Damage	18	kevster	Persson, Kevin	Sweden
Damage	7	MirroR	Trịnh, Gia Huy	Vietnam
Damage	77	Jaru	White, Jason	United States
Tank	2	OGE	Son Min-seok	South Korea
Tank	27	LhCloudy	Tiihonen, Roni	Finland
Tank	16	SPACE	Halpern, Indy	United States
Tank	31	Bischu	Kim Hyung-seok	South Korea
Support	0	BigG00se	Isohanni, Benjamin	Finland
Support	52	Shaz	Suovaara, Jonas	Finland

Head coach

- David "dpei" Pei

Legend:
- (I) Inactive
- (S) Suspended
- (2W) Two-way player
- Substitute
- (injured) Injury / Illness

Latest roster transaction: June 20, 2020.

=== Transactions ===
Transactions of/for players on the roster during the 2020 regular season:

- On June 6, the Gladiators acquired DPS Josh "Sideshow" Wilkinson from the Florida Mayhem on a 14-day contract.
- On June 7, the Gladiators transferred support Nolan "Paintbrush" Edwards from the Dallas Fuel.
- On June 16, the Gladiators signed DPS Kevin "Kevster" Persson.

== Standings ==
Pos	Con	Team	Pld	W	BW	L	PCT	MW	ML	MT	MD	Qualification
1	ATL	Philadelphia Fusion	21	19	5	2	0.905	59	19	0	+40	Advance to playoffs
2	PAC	San Francisco Shock	21	18	7	3	0.857	56	17	2	+39	Advance to playoffs
3	ATL	Paris Eternal	21	15	4	6	0.714	50	31	0	+19	Advance to playoffs
4	ATL	Florida Mayhem	21	14	3	7	0.667	48	30	0	+18	Advance to playoffs
5	PAC	Los Angeles Valiant	21	11	1	10	0.524	41	41	0	0	Advance to playoffs
6	PAC	Los Angeles Gladiators	21	11	0	10	0.524	43	39	5	+4	Advance to play-ins
7	ATL	Atlanta Reign	21	10	0	11	0.476	43	35	0	+8	Advance to play-ins
8	PAC	Dallas Fuel	21	9	0	12	0.429	35	44	0	−9	Advance to play-ins
9	ATL	Toronto Defiant	21	7	1	14	0.333	32	48	0	−16	Advance to play-ins
10	ATL	Houston Outlaws	21	6	0	15	0.286	32	50	3	−18	Advance to play-ins
11	PAC	Vancouver Titans	21	6	0	15	0.286	23	48	0	−25	Advance to play-ins
12	ATL	Washington Justice	21	4	0	17	0.190	21	54	1	−33	Advance to play-ins
13	ATL	Boston Uprising	21	2	0	19	0.095	14	61	4	−47	Advance to play-ins

Source: The Overwatch League
Rules for classification: 1) Wins plus bonus wins 2) winning percentage (excluding bonus wins); 3) map differential; 4) head-to-head record; 5) head-to-head map differential

== Game log ==
=== Regular season ===
2020 game log (Regular season record: 11–10)
February–April: 3–3

1	February 08	Los Angeles Gladiators	2	–	3	Vancouver Titans	Arlington, TX
	2:00 pm PST						Esports Stadium Arlington
		2	Nepal			1	
		2	King's Row			3	
		0	Hanamura			2	
		2	Dorado			1	
		0	Lijiang Tower			2	

2	March 28	Los Angeles Gladiators	3	–	1	San Francisco Shock	Online
	11:00 pm UTC						

3	March 29	Los Angeles Gladiators	0	–	3	Seoul Dynasty	Online
	10:00 pm UTC						

4	April 04	Los Angeles Gladiators	3	–	0	Dallas Fuel	Online
	10:00 pm UTC						

5	April 13	Los Angeles Gladiators	0	–	3	San Francisco Shock	Online
	12:00 midnight UTC						

6	April 17	Los Angeles Gladiators	3	–	2	Los Angeles Valiant	Online
	1:00 am UTC						

May Melee qualifiers: 1–2

7	May 03	Los Angeles Gladiators	3	–	1	Toronto Defiant	Online
	11:00 pm UTC						

8	May 09	Los Angeles Gladiators	1	–	3	Paris Eternal	Online
	7:00 pm UTC						

9	May 16	Los Angeles Gladiators	2	–	3	Boston Uprising	Online
	10:30 pm UTC						

Summer Showdown qualifiers: 2–1

10	June 13	Los Angeles Gladiators	3	–	1	Atlanta Reign	Online
	11:00 pm UTC						

11	June 20	Los Angeles Gladiators	1	–	3	Houston Outlaws	Online
	11:00 pm UTC						

12	June 28	Los Angeles Gladiators	3	–	1	Washington Justice	Online
	1:00 am UTC						

Countdown Cup qualifiers: 1–3

13	July 18	Los Angeles Gladiators	3	–	0	Vancouver Titans	Online
	7:00 pm UTC						

14	July 26	Los Angeles Gladiators	0	–	3	Paris Eternal	Online
	7:00 pm UTC						

15	July 26	Los Angeles Gladiators	2	–	3	Philadelphia Fusion	Online
	1:00 am UTC						

16	August 02	Los Angeles Gladiators	1	–	3	Florida Mayhem	Online
	9:00 pm UTC						

August: 4–1

17	August 14	Los Angeles Gladiators	3	–	0	Dallas Fuel	Online
	9:00 pm UTC						

18	August 15	Los Angeles Gladiators	3	–	0	Boston Uprising	Online
	11:00 pm UTC						

19	August 21	Los Angeles Gladiators	1	–	3	Florida Mayhem	Online
	9:00 pm UTC						

20	August 22	Los Angeles Gladiators	3	–	1	Atlanta Reign	Online
	11:00 pm UTC						

21	August 23	Los Angeles Gladiators	3	–	2	Los Angeles Valiant	Online
	11:00 pm UTC						

=== Midseason tournaments ===
2020 midseason tournaments game log
May Melee: 1–1

Knockouts	May 22	Los Angeles Gladiators	3	–	0	Washington Justice	Online
	10:00 pm UTC						

Quarterfinals	May 23	Los Angeles Gladiators	1	–	3	Philadelphia Fusion	Online
	11:00 pm UTC						

Summer Showdown: 0–1

Knockouts	July 04	Los Angeles Gladiators	1	–	3	Washington Justice	Online
	1:00 am UTC						

Countdown Cup: 1–1

Knockouts	August 08	Los Angeles Gladiators	3	–	2	Toronto Defiant	Online
	1:00 am UTC						

Quarterfinals	August 08	Los Angeles Gladiators	0	–	3	Philadelphia Fusion	Online
	9:00 pm UTC						

Bonus wins awarded: 0

=== Postseason ===
2020 playoff game log
North America Play-ins: 1–0

Round 1	First-round bye

Round 2	September 04	Los Angeles Gladiators	3	–	2	Toronto Defiant	Online
	7:00 pm UTC						

North America Bracket: 0–2

Upper Round 1	September 05	Los Angeles Gladiators	0	–	3	Philadelphia Fusion	Online
	7:00 pm UTC						

Lower Round 1	September 06	Los Angeles Gladiators	0	–	3	Florida Mayhem	Online
	7:00 pm UTC						
