= 2020 Overwatch League playoffs =

Overwatch League playoffs occurring in 2020

2020 Overwatch League Playoffs

Tournament information
- Game: Overwatch
- Dates: September 3–October 10
- Administrator: Activision-Blizzard
- Teams: 12
- Purse: $4,000,000

Tournament statistics
- Matches played: 24

Grand Finals
- Location: Online
- Champion: San Francisco Shock
- Runner-up: Seoul Dynasty
- Finals MVP: Kwon "Striker" Nam-joo

The 2020 Overwatch League playoffs was the postseason tournament of the 2020 Overwatch League regular season, which began on September 3 and concluded with the 2020 Grand Finals, the third championship match of the Overwatch League (OWL), on October 10.

Twelve teams competed in the OWL Playoffs, which was broken down into two double-elimination regional tournaments, the North America Bracket and Asia Bracket, that culminated into the double-elimination Grand Finals Bracket. The winner of each round of the playoffs was determined by a single-match. The final two teams remaining in the tournament advanced to the Grand Finals.

The defending OWL champions were the San Francisco Shock, who won the title against the Vancouver Titans in the 2019 OWL Grand Finals. The Shock defeated the Seoul Dynasty in the Grand Finals to claim their second consecutive Overwatch League title.

== Format ==
Twelve total teams qualified for the season playoffs split into two regional brackets. In the North America region, eight teams qualified for the North America Bracket. The top five teams from the regular season were awarded the top five seeds and the top three teams from the play-in tournament were awarded seeds six through eight. In the Asia region, four teams qualified for the Asia Bracket. The top two teams from the regular season were awarded the top two seeds and the top two teams from the play-in tournament were awarded three and four.

Each playoff bracket is a double-elimination tournament. However, the winners of the upper and lower finals in each respective bracket did not face each other. Instead, they both qualified for the Grand Finals bracket – another double-elimination tournament. The winners of the upper and lower bracket in the Grand Finals bracket played in the Grand Finals match.

== Participants ==
=== North America ===
Seed	Team	Conference	Record	MR	MD
1	Philadelphia Fusion	ATL	24–2	59–19–0	+40
2	San Francisco Shock	PAC	25–3	56–17–2	+39
3	Paris Eternal	ATL	18–6	47–30–0	+17
4	Florida Mayhem	ATL	17–7	48–30–0	+18
5	Los Angeles Valiant	PAC	12–10	41–41–0	±0
6	Los Angeles Gladiators	PAC	11–10	43–39–5	+4
7	Atlanta Reign	ATL	10–11	43–35–0	+8
8	Washington Justice	ATL	4–17	21–54–1	-33

=== Asia ===
Seed	Team	Conference	Record	MR	MD
1	Shanghai Dragons	PAC	27–2	59–15–1	+44
2	Guangzhou Charge	PAC	18–7	44–39–1	+5
3	New York Excelsior	ATL	16–8	50–30–2	+20
4	Seoul Dynasty	PAC	12–12	33–47–1	-14

== Brackets ==
Teams in bold advanced to the next round. The numbers to the left of each team indicate the team's seeding in the bracket, and the numbers to the right indicate the number of maps the team won in that match.

=== North America ===
Upper Round 1 September 5	Upper Round 2 September 6	Upper Final; September 12
**1**	**Philadelphia Fusion**	**3**
6	Los Angeles Gladiators	0
**1**	**Philadelphia Fusion**	**3**
5	Los Angeles Valiant	0
4	Florida Mayhem	2
**5**	**Los Angeles Valiant**	**3**
1	Philadelphia Fusion	1
**2**	**San Francisco Shock**	**3**
**2**	**San Francisco Shock**	**3**
8	Washington Justice	2
**2**	**San Francisco Shock**	**3**
7	Atlanta Reign	1
3	Paris Eternal	2
**7**	**Atlanta Reign**	**3**
Lower Round 1 September 6	Lower Round 2 September 11	Lower Round 3 September 12	Lower Final; September 13
7	Atlanta Reign	0
**4**	**Florida Mayhem**	**3**	**4**	**Florida Mayhem**	**3**	**1**	**Philadelphia Fusion**	**3**
6	Los Angeles Gladiators	0	4	Florida Mayhem	0	8	Washington Justice	0
**8**	**Washington Justice**	**3**
5	Los Angeles Valiant	1
3	Paris Eternal	0	**8**	**Washington Justice**	**3**
**8**	**Washington Justice**	**3**

=== Asia ===
Upper Round 1 September 6
**1**	**Shanghai Dragons**	**3**
3	New York Excelsior	1
2	Guangzhou Charge	0
**4**	**Seoul Dynasty**	**3**
Lower Round 1 September 12
2	Guangzhou Charge	0
**3**	**New York Excelsior**	**3**

Upper Final; September 12
**1**	**Shanghai Dragons**	**3**
4	Seoul Dynasty	2
Lower Final; September 13
**4**	**Seoul Dynasty**	**3**
3	New York Excelsior	0

=== Grand Finals ===
The Grand Finals Bracket will take place from October 8 to 10 in Asia.

Upper Round 1 October 8
A2	Seoul Dynasty	2
**NA1**	**San Francisco Shock**	**3**
NA2	Philadelphia Fusion	0
**A1**	**Shanghai Dragons**	**3**
Lower Round 1 October 9
**A2**	**Seoul Dynasty**	**3**
NA2	Philadelphia Fusion	0

Upper Final; October 9
**NA1**	**San Francisco Shock**	**3**
A1	Shanghai Dragons	2
Lower Final; October 9
A1	Shanghai Dragons	2
**A2**	**Seoul Dynasty**	**3**

Grand Finals; October 10
**NA1**	**San Francisco Shock**	**4**
A2	Seoul Dynasty	2

== Winnings ==
Teams in the playoffs competed for a total prize pool of US$4 million, with the payout division detailed below.

Pos	Team	Bonus
1	San Francisco Shock	$1,500,000
2	Seoul Dynasty	$750,000
3	Shanghai Dragons	$450,000
4	Philadelphia Fusion	$350,000
5	New York Excelsior	$250,000
5	Washington Justice	$250,000
7	Atlanta Reign	$75,000
7	Florida Mayhem	$75,000
7	Guangzhou Charge	$75,000
7	Los Angeles Gladiators	$75,000
7	Los Angeles Valiant	$75,000
7	Paris Eternal	$75,000

== Broadcast and viewership ==
All matches of the playoffs were live-streamed and on-demand on YouTube.
