= 2020 Dallas Fuel season =

- Head coach: Aaron Atkins (rel. Aug 3); Kim Yong-jin (Interim)
- General manager: Mathew Taylor
- Owner: Mike Rufail; Kenneth Hersh
- Arena(s): Esports Stadium Arlington
- Conference: Pacific
- Division: West
- Region: North America

Results
- Record: 9–12 (.429)
- Place: North America: 8th; League: 13th
- May Melee: Quarterfinals
- Summer Showdown: Knockouts
- Countdown Cup: Quarterfinals
- Season Playoffs: Did not qualify
- Total Earnings: $10,000

The 2020 Dallas Fuel season was the third season of the Dallas Fuel's existence in the Overwatch League. The Fuel planned to host a league-high five homestand weekends in the 2020 season at Esports Stadium Arlington, Toyota Music Factory, the Allen Event Center, and two more undetermined locations. While the first homestand at Esports Stadium Arlington took place, all other homestands were canceled due to the COVID-19 pandemic.

After a 7–10 start to the season and failure to make it past the quarterfinals in any of the three midseason tournaments, the Fuel released head coach Aaron "Aero" Atkins on August 3 and announced that assistant coach Kim Yong-jin served would as the interim head coach for the remainder of the season. Dallas finished the season with a 9–12 record, marking their third consecutive season with a losing regular season record. A 0–3 loss to the Washington Justice on September 4 in the North America play-ins tournament took the Fuel out of postseason contention.

== Preceding offseason ==
=== Organizational changes ===
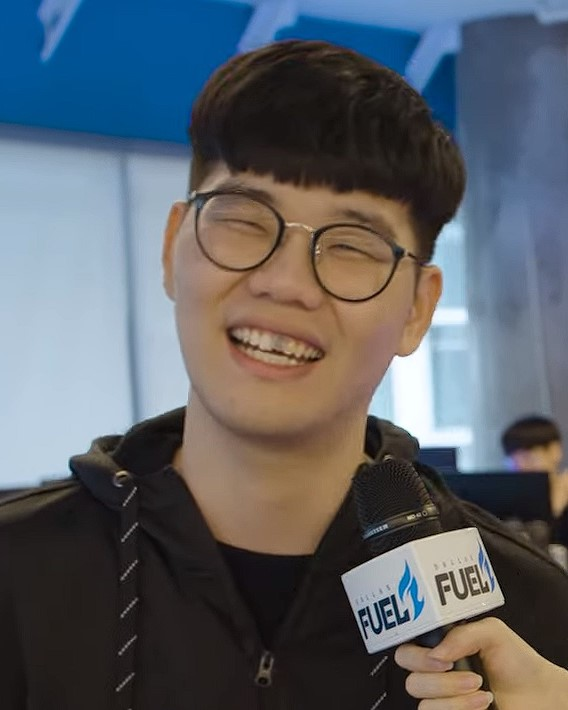
Kim Yong-jin became the interim head coach on August 3.

On November 15, assistant coach Justin "Jayne" Conroy announced that he would be stepping down from his position to move to a content creation role within Envy Gaming. Weeks later, on December 5, the Fuel mutually parted ways with assistance coach Julien "daemoN" Ducros. The Fuel finalized their coaching staff heading into the 2020 season on December 9, announcing the return of head coach Aaron "Aero" Atkins, the return of Louis "Tikatee" Lebel-Wong and Kang "Vol’Jin" Min-gyu as assistant coaches, and the signing of former Element Mystic assistant coach Kim "Yong" Yong-Jin as an assistant coach.

=== Roster changes ===
Heading into the 2020 season, the Fuel's only free agent is only off-tank Lucas "NotE" Meissner, who was traded from the Boston Uprising to Dallas the previous season. Free agency officially began on October 7. NotE was re-signed to the Fuel on October 30.

The Fuel's first transaction of the offseason took place on October 29, when they traded main tank Son "OGE" Min-seok to the Los Angeles Gladiators in exchange for flex DPS Jang "Decay" Gui-un. In OGE's replacement, the team announced the signing of former Shanghai Dragons main tank Noh "Gamsu" Young-jin on November 4. A week later, the team signed Element Mystic DPS Kim "Doha" Dong-ha. On January 8, the team sent DPS Timo "Taimou" Kettunen down to their academy team Team Envy. The Fuel parted way with tank player Pongphop "Micke" Rattanasangchod just under two weeks before the beginning of the season; Micke moved to a content creator role for Envy Gaming. On February 3, Dallas announced their full roster, which included the promotion of support player William "Crimzo" Hernandez from Team Envy.

== Roster ==
2020 Dallas Fuel roster
Players
Coaches

Role	No.	Handle	Name	Nationality
Damage	10	aKm	Bignet, Dylan	France
Damage	20	Doha	Kim Dong-ha	South Korea
Damage	27	Onigod	Fiskerstrand, Stefan	Norway
Tank	3	NotE	Meissner, Lucas	Canada
Tank	30	Trill	Powell, Ashley	Australia
Tank	1	Gamsu	Noh Young-jin	South Korea
Support	17	Closer	Jung Won-sik	South Korea
Support	12	Paintbrush	Edwards, Nolan	United States
Support	24	Unkoe	Chevasson, Benjamin	France
Support	28	Crimzo	Hernandez, William	Canada

Head coach

- Kim "Yong" Yong-jin (Interim)

Legend:
- (I) Inactive
- (S) Suspended
- (2W) Two-way player
- Substitute
- (injured) Injury / Illness

Latest roster transaction: August 5, 2020.

=== Transactions ===
Transactions of/for players on the roster during the 2020 regular season:

- On June 3, DPS Zachary "ZachaREEE" Lombardo retired.
- On June 7, the Fuel acquired support Nolan "Paintbrush" Edwards from the Los Angeles Gladiators.
- On June 19, the Fuel signed DPS Stefan "Onigod" Fiskerstrand.
- On August 3, the Fuel released DPS Jang "Decay" Gui-un.
- On August 5, the Fuel released support Jonathan "HarryHook" Tejedor Rua.

== Standings ==
Pos	Con	Team	Pld	W	BW	L	PCT	MW	ML	MT	MD	Qualification
1	ATL	Philadelphia Fusion	21	19	5	2	0.905	59	19	0	+40	Advance to playoffs
2	PAC	San Francisco Shock	21	18	7	3	0.857	56	17	2	+39	Advance to playoffs
3	ATL	Paris Eternal	21	15	4	6	0.714	50	31	0	+19	Advance to playoffs
4	ATL	Florida Mayhem	21	14	3	7	0.667	48	30	0	+18	Advance to playoffs
5	PAC	Los Angeles Valiant	21	11	1	10	0.524	41	41	0	0	Advance to playoffs
6	PAC	Los Angeles Gladiators	21	11	0	10	0.524	43	39	5	+4	Advance to play-ins
7	ATL	Atlanta Reign	21	10	0	11	0.476	43	35	0	+8	Advance to play-ins
8	PAC	Dallas Fuel	21	9	0	12	0.429	35	44	0	−9	Advance to play-ins
9	ATL	Toronto Defiant	21	7	1	14	0.333	32	48	0	−16	Advance to play-ins
10	ATL	Houston Outlaws	21	6	0	15	0.286	32	50	3	−18	Advance to play-ins
11	PAC	Vancouver Titans	21	6	0	15	0.286	23	48	0	−25	Advance to play-ins
12	ATL	Washington Justice	21	4	0	17	0.190	21	54	1	−33	Advance to play-ins
13	ATL	Boston Uprising	21	2	0	19	0.095	14	61	4	−47	Advance to play-ins

Source: The Overwatch League
Rules for classification: 1) Wins plus bonus wins 2) winning percentage (excluding bonus wins); 3) map differential; 4) head-to-head record; 5) head-to-head map differential

== Game log ==
=== Regular season ===
2020 game log (Regular season record: 9–12)
February–April: 3–4

1	February 08	Los Angeles Valiant	3	–	1	Dallas Fuel	Arlington, TX
	6:00 pm CST						Esports Stadium Arlington
		1	Lijiang Tower			2	
		2	Blizzard World			1	
		4	Horizon Lunar Colony			3	
		3	Junkertown			2	

2	February 09	San Francisco Shock	3	–	1	Dallas Fuel	Arlington, TX
	6:00 pm CST						Esports Stadium Arlington
		2	Oasis			1	
		3	Eichenwalde			2	
		0	Horizon Lunar Colony			1	
		3	Havana			0	

3	April 04	Dallas Fuel	0	–	3	Los Angeles Gladiators	Online
	10:00 pm UTC						

4	April 06	Dallas Fuel	3	–	2	Los Angeles Valiant	Online
	12:00 midnight UTC						

5	April 12	Dallas Fuel	3	–	0	Washington Justice	Online
	12:00 midnight UTC						

6	April 18	Dallas Fuel	2	–	3	San Francisco Shock	Online
	2:00 am UTC						

7	April 26	Dallas Fuel	3	–	2	Houston Outlaws	Online
	10:00 pm UTC						

May Melee qualifiers: 1–2

8	May 02	Dallas Fuel	3	–	0	Washington Justice	Online
	7:00 pm UTC						

9	May 10	Dallas Fuel	1	–	3	Philadelphia Fusion	Online
	7:00 pm UTC						

10	May 17	Dallas Fuel	0	–	3	Paris Eternal	Online
	7:00 pm UTC						

Summer Showdown qualifiers: 1–2

11	June 13	Dallas Fuel	1	–	3	Florida Mayhem	Online
	9:00 pm UTC						

12	June 20	Dallas Fuel	0	–	3	Vancouver Titans	Online
	11:45 pm UTC						

13	June 27	Dallas Fuel	3	–	0	Toronto Defiant	Online
	9:00 pm UTC						

Countdown Cup qualifiers: 2–2

14	July 17	Dallas Fuel	3	–	2	Houston Outlaws	Online
	9:00 pm UTC						

15	July 25	Dallas Fuel	3	–	1	Boston Uprising	Online
	11:00 pm UTC						

16	July 31	Dallas Fuel	0	–	3	Philadelphia Fusion	Online
	7:00 pm UTC						

17	August 02	Dallas Fuel	1	–	3	Atlanta Reign	Online
	7:00 pm UTC						

August: 2–2

18	August 14	Dallas Fuel	0	–	3	Los Angeles Gladiators	Online
	9:00 pm UTC						

19	August 15	Dallas Fuel	3	–	0	Vancouver Titans	Online
	9:00 pm UTC						

20	August 22	Dallas Fuel	3	–	1	Toronto Defiant	Online
	9:00 pm UTC						

21	August 23	Dallas Fuel	1	–	3	Paris Eternal	Online
	7:00 pm UTC						

=== Midseason tournaments ===
2020 midseason tournaments game log
May Melee: 1–1

Knockouts	May 22	Dallas Fuel	3	–	1	Houston Outlaws	Online
	7:30 pm UTC						

Quarterfinals	May 23	Dallas Fuel	1	–	3	San Francisco Shock	Online
	7:00 pm UTC						

Summer Showdown: 0–1

Knockouts	July 03	Dallas Fuel	1	–	3	Paris Eternal	Online
	7:00 pm UTC						

Countdown Cup: 1–1

Knockouts	August 07	Dallas Fuel	3	–	2	Washington Justice	Online
	11:00 pm UTC						

Quarterfinals	August 08	Dallas Fuel	0	–	3	San Francisco Shock	Online
	7:00 pm UTC						

Bonus wins awarded: 0

=== Postseason ===
2020 playoff game log
North America Play-ins: 0–1

Round 1	First-round bye

Round 2	September 04	Dallas Fuel	0	–	3	Washington Justice	Online
	11:00 pm UTC						
