= 2020 San Francisco Shock season =

- Overwatch League champions
- Head coach: Park "Crusty" Dae-hee
- General manager: Chris "thugnasty" Chung
- Owner: Andy Miller
- Conference: Pacific
- Division: West
- Region: North America

Results
- Record: 18–3 (.857)
- Place: North America: 2nd; League: 3rd
- May Melee: Champions
- Summer Showdown: Semifinals
- Countdown Cup: Champions
- Season Playoffs: Champions
- Total Earnings: $2,850,000

The 2020 San Francisco Shock season was the third season of the San Francisco Shock's existence in the Overwatch League and their second under head coach Park "Crusty" Dae-hee. The team entered the season as the defending Overwatch League champions, after winning the 2019 Grand Finals. The Shock planned to host two homestand weekends in the 2020 season at Zellerbach Hall in Berkeley and the San Jose Civic in downtown San Jose, but both were cancelled in light of the COVID-19 pandemic.

The Shock ended the regular season with 18 wins, 7 bonus wins, and 3 losses. San Francisco faced the eighth-seeded Washington Justice on September 5 in the first round of the 2020 North America playoffs bracket, and after falling 0–2 in the match, the Shock won three straight maps to move on to the second round of the upper bracket. The team next defeated the seventh-seeded Atlanta Reign by a score of 3–1. Moving on to the upper bracket finals, the Shock faced the top-seeded Philadelphia Fusion. Despite keeping the maps close, the Shock came out with a 3–1 victory and advanced to the Grand Finals bracket. As the top North America seed in the Grand Finals bracket, the Shock faced Asia's second-seeded Seoul Dynasty in the bracket's first round on October 8. After the Shock came out with a quick 2–0 lead, the Dynasty evened up the score, winning the following two maps; however, San Francisco won the final map of the match and moved on to the Upper Bracket finals. The team faced Asia's top-seeded Shanghai Dragons in the upper finals, where, again, the Shock started the match with a 2–0 lead, but the Dragons tied up the series after four maps. The Shock won the final map of the match to advance to the Grand Finals match. In the Grand Finals match, the Shock defeated the Seoul Dynasty by a score of 4–2 to win their second consecutive OWL championship.

== Preceding offseason ==
=== Organizational changes ===
On October 18, it was announced that assistant coach Kim "NineK" Beom-hoon had signed with the Paris Eternal as a coach. The Shock signed Talon Esports head coach Lee "Arachne" Ji-won as a coach a month later.

=== Roster changes ===
The Shock enter the new season with one free agent, no players which they have the option to retain for another year, and nine players under contract. The OWL's deadline to exercise a team option is November 11, after which any players not retained will become a free agent. Free agency officially began on October 7.

On October 9, the Shock announce that they would not re-sign their only free agent off-tank Andreas "Nevix" Karlsson, who had been with the team since their inception in 2017. On December 23, the team picked up sniper specialist Lee "ANS" Seon-chang, who had been retired since January 2019.

== Roster ==
2020 San Francisco Shock roster
Players
Coaches

Role	No.	Handle	Name	Nationality
Damage	7	Striker	Kwon Nam-joo	South Korea
Damage	27	Rascal	Kim Dong-jun	South Korea
Damage	47	ta1yo	Henderson, Sean Taiyo	Japan
Damage	10	ANS	Lee Seon-chang	South Korea
Tank	1	super	DeLisi, Matthew	United States
Tank	5	smurf	Yoo Myeong-hwan	South Korea
Tank	11	ChoiHyoBin	Choi Hyo-bin	South Korea
Support	64	Moth	Espe, Grant	United States
Support	17	Viol2t	Park Min-ki	South Korea
Support	13	Twilight	Lee Joo-seok	South Korea

Head coach

- Park Dae-hee

Legend:
- (I) Inactive
- (S) Suspended
- (2W) Two-way player
- Substitute
- (injured) Injury / Illness

Latest roster transaction: July 21, 2020.

=== Transactions ===
Transactions of/for players on the roster during the 2020 regular season:

- On April 28, the Shock released DPS Jay "Sinatraa" Won.
- On May 17, the Shock transferred DPS Park "Architect" Min-ho to the Hangzhou Spark and signed support Lee "Twilight" Jooseok.
- On July 21, the Shock signed DPS Sean Taiyo "Ta1yo" Henderson.

== Standings ==
Pos	Con	Team	Pld	W	BW	L	PCT	MW	ML	MT	MD	Qualification
1	ATL	Philadelphia Fusion	21	19	5	2	0.905	59	19	0	+40	Advance to playoffs
2	PAC	San Francisco Shock	21	18	7	3	0.857	56	17	2	+39	Advance to playoffs
3	ATL	Paris Eternal	21	15	4	6	0.714	50	31	0	+19	Advance to playoffs
4	ATL	Florida Mayhem	21	14	3	7	0.667	48	30	0	+18	Advance to playoffs
5	PAC	Los Angeles Valiant	21	11	1	10	0.524	41	41	0	0	Advance to playoffs
6	PAC	Los Angeles Gladiators	21	11	0	10	0.524	43	39	5	+4	Advance to play-ins
7	ATL	Atlanta Reign	21	10	0	11	0.476	43	35	0	+8	Advance to play-ins
8	PAC	Dallas Fuel	21	9	0	12	0.429	35	44	0	−9	Advance to play-ins
9	ATL	Toronto Defiant	21	7	1	14	0.333	32	48	0	−16	Advance to play-ins
10	ATL	Houston Outlaws	21	6	0	15	0.286	32	50	3	−18	Advance to play-ins
11	PAC	Vancouver Titans	21	6	0	15	0.286	23	48	0	−25	Advance to play-ins
12	ATL	Washington Justice	21	4	0	17	0.190	21	54	1	−33	Advance to play-ins
13	ATL	Boston Uprising	21	2	0	19	0.095	14	61	4	−47	Advance to play-ins

Source: The Overwatch League
Rules for classification: 1) Wins plus bonus wins 2) winning percentage (excluding bonus wins); 3) map differential; 4) head-to-head record; 5) head-to-head map differential

== Game log ==
=== Regular season ===
2020 game log (Regular season record: 18–3)
February–March: 5–2

1	February 09	San Francisco Shock	3	–	1	Dallas Fuel	Arlington, TX
	4:00 pm PST						Esports Stadium Arlington
		2	Oasis			1	
		3	Eichenwalde			2	
		0	Horizon Lunar Colony			1	
		3	Havana			0	

2	March 28	San Francisco Shock	1	–	3	Los Angeles Gladiators	Online
	11:00 pm UTC						

3	March 30	San Francisco Shock	1	–	3	Los Angeles Valiant	Online
	12:00 midnight UTC						

4	April 05	San Francisco Shock	3	–	1	Los Angeles Valiant	Online
	12:00 midnight UTC						

5	April 13	San Francisco Shock	3	–	0	Los Angeles Gladiators	Online
	12:00 midnight UTC						

6	April 18	San Francisco Shock	3	–	2	Dallas Fuel	Online
	2:00 am UTC						

7	April 25	San Francisco Shock	3	–	0	Los Angeles Valiant	Online
	10:00 pm UTC						

May Melee qualifiers: 3–0

8	May 02	San Francisco Shock	3	–	0	Houston Outlaws	Online
	11:00 pm UTC						

9	May 10	San Francisco Shock	3	–	1	Toronto Defiant	Online
	9:00 pm UTC						

10	May 17	San Francisco Shock	3	–	0	Atlanta Reign	Online
	1:00 am UTC						

Summer Showdown qualifiers: 3–0

11	June 20	San Francisco Shock	3	–	0	Paris Eternal	Online
	7:00 pm UTC						

12	June 21	San Francisco Shock	3	–	0	Washington Justice	Online
	10:25 pm UTC						

13	June 28	San Francisco Shock	3	–	0	Philadelphia Fusion	Online
	11:00 pm UTC						

Countdown Cup qualifiers: 4–0

14	July 18	San Francisco Shock	3	–	0	Boston Uprising	Online
	10:00 pm UTC						

15	July 24	San Francisco Shock	3	–	1	Florida Mayhem	Online
	9:00 pm UTC						

16	July 25	San Francisco Shock	3	–	0	Vancouver Titans	Online
	7:00 pm UTC						

17	August 01	San Francisco Shock	3	–	0	Houston Outlaws	Online
	11:00 pm UTC						

August: 3–1

18	August 16	San Francisco Shock	0	–	3	Philadelphia Fusion	Online
	1:00 am UTC						

19	August 16	San Francisco Shock	3	–	0	Toronto Defiant	Online
	7:00 pm UTC						

20	August 22	San Francisco Shock	3	–	0	Washington Justice	Online
	7:00 pm UTC						

21	August 23	San Francisco Shock	3	–	2	Atlanta Reign	Online
	9:00 pm UTC						

=== Midseason tournaments ===
2020 midseason tournaments game log
May Melee: 3–0

Quarterfinals	May 23	San Francisco Shock	3	–	1	Dallas Fuel	Online
	7:00 pm UTC						

Semifinals	May 24	San Francisco Shock	3	–	0	Los Angeles Valiant	Online
	7:00 pm UTC						

Finals	May 24	San Francisco Shock	4	–	2	Florida Mayhem	Online
	11:00 pm UTC						

Summer Showdown: 1–1

Quarterfinals	July 04	San Francisco Shock	3	–	0	Washington Justice	Online
	11:00 pm UTC						

Semifinals	July 05	San Francisco Shock	2	–	3	Paris Eternal	Online
	9:20 pm UTC						

Countdown Cup: 3–0

Quarterfinals	August 08	San Francisco Shock	3	–	0	Dallas Fuel	Online
	7:00 pm UTC						

Semifinals	August 09	San Francisco Shock	3	–	1	Florida Mayhem	Online
	5:00 pm UTC						

Finals	August 09	San Francisco Shock	4	–	2	Philadelphia Fusion	Online
	9:00 pm UTC						

Bonus wins awarded: 7

=== Postseason ===
2020 playoff game log
North America Bracket: 3–0

Upper Round 1	September 05	San Francisco Shock	3	–	2	Washington Justice	Online
	11:00 pm UTC						

Upper Round 2	September 07	San Francisco Shock	3	–	1	Atlanta Reign	Online
	1:00 am UTC						

Upper Finals	September 12	San Francisco Shock	3	–	1	Philadelphia Fusion	Online
	7:00 pm UTC						

Grand Finals Bracket: 3–0

Upper Round 1	October 08	San Francisco Shock	3	–	2	Seoul Dynasty	Online
	11:00 am UTC						

Upper Round 2	October 09	San Francisco Shock	3	–	2	Shanghai Dragons	Online
	9:00 am UTC						

Grand Finals	October 10	San Francisco Shock	4	–	2	Seoul Dynasty	Online
	1:00 pm UTC						
