= Bayou Music Center =

Indoor theatre in Houston, Texas

Coordinates: 29.762242°N 95.366872°W

- Interactive map of Bayou Music Center
- Former names: Aerial Theater (1997-2002); Verizon Wireless Theater (2002-12); Revention Music Center (2015-20)
- Address: 520 Texas Avenue
- Location: Bayou Place, Houston, Texas, U.S.
- Owner: Live Nation Entertainment
- Capacity: 3,464 General admission (standing room); 2,400 Theater (all reserved)

Construction
- Opened: November 14, 1997

Website
- bayoumusiccenter.com

The Bayou Music Center (originally known as the Aerial Theater) is an indoor theater owned by Live Nation and located in Houston, Texas, United States. The theater is located at the Bayou Place entertainment complex in Downtown Houston.

== Naming history ==
- Aerial Theater (November 14, 1997—February 2, 2002)
- Verizon Wireless Theater (February 3, 2002—March 13, 2012)
- Bayou Music Center (March 14, 2012—August 11, 2015; July 1, 2020—present)
- Revention Music Center (August 12, 2015—June 30, 2020)

== See also ==
- House of Blues
