= Ferguson (name) =

Origin
- Meaning: "son of Fergus"
- Region of origin: Scotland

Other names
- Variant form: Clan Fergusson

Ferguson is an Anglicization of the Scots Gaelic "Macfhearghus", a patronymic form of the personal name Fergus which translates as son of the angry (one). Fergus derives from the Gaelic elements ‘fear’ (man) and ‘gus’ (vigor or strength), thus meaning ‘man of vigor.’ While some poetic interpretations associate the name with anger or battle fury, this is not the primary etymological meaning.

== Notable people with the name ==
=== Surname ===
==== A ====
- Abbie Park Ferguson (1837–1919), American educator, founder of Huguenot College
- Adair Ferguson (born 1955), Australian rower
- Adam Ferguson (disambiguation), multiple people
- Adele Ferguson (living), Australian investigative journalist
- Adjutor Ferguson (1927–2004), Canadian politician
- Aitken Ferguson (1891–1975), Scottish communist activist
- Al Ferguson (1888–1971), Irish-American actor
- Alan Ferguson (politician) (born 1943), Australian politician
- Alan Ferguson (director) (born 1963), American music video director
- Alane Ferguson (born 1957), American writer
- Aldwin Ferguson (1935–2008), Trinidad and Tobago footballer
- Alejandro Ferguson (born 1978), Argentine cricketer
- Alex Ferguson (disambiguation), multiple people
- Alexander Ferguson (1860–1925), Canadian politician
- Alicia Ferguson (born 1981), Australian association football player
- Allan Ferguson (born 1969), Scottish footballer
- Allyn Ferguson (1924–2010), American composer
- Alphonso Ferguson (died 1946), African American man killed by white police officer
- Amanda Ferguson (born 1967), British fencer
- Amos Ferguson (1920–2009), Bahamian folk artist
- Amy Ferguson (living), American actress
- Andrew Ferguson (disambiguation), multiple people
- Andy Ferguson (born 1985), Scottish footballer
- Angella D. Ferguson (1925–2026), pediatrician
- Ann Ferguson (born 1938), feminist philosopher
- Anne Ferguson (judge) (living), Australian judge
- Anne Ferguson (physician) (1941–1998), Scottish physician and researcher
- Annette Ferguson (born 1950), Scottish astronomer
- Anwar Ferguson (born 1981), Bahamanian professional basketball player
- Archibald Ferguson (deceased), Scottish footballer
- Archie Ferguson (1918–1998), association football player
- Arthur Ferguson (disambiguation), multiple people
- Artie Ferguson (1910–1969), Australian rules footballer

==== B ====
- Barry Ferguson (born 1978), Scottish footballer
- Barry Ferguson (Irish footballer) (born 1979), Irish footballer
- Bassett Ferguson (died 1853), American politician
- Benjamin Ferguson (disambiguation) multiple people
- Beryl Ferguson, South African politician
- Bianca Ferguson (born 1955), American actress
- Bill Ferguson (disambiguation), multiple people
- Billy Ferguson (1938–1998), association football player
- Blake Ferguson (American football) (born 1997), American football player
- Blake Ferguson (rugby league) (born 1990), Australian rugby league player
- Bob Ferguson (disambiguation), multiple people
- Bobby Ferguson (footballer, born 1938) (1938–2018), English footballer
- Bobby Ferguson (footballer, born 1945) (born 1945), Scottish footballer
- Brad Ferguson (born 1953), American writer
- Brendan Q. Ferguson (living), game designer
- Brown Ferguson (born 1981), Scottish footballer
- Bruce Ferguson (disambiguation), multiple people
- Bryan M. Ferguson (born 1987), Scottish filmmaker and music video director

==== C ====
- Caleb Ferguson (born 1996), American baseball player
- Callum Ferguson (born 1984), Australian cricketer
- Calum Ferguson (born 1995), Canadian soccer player
- Casson Ferguson (1891–1929), actor
- Catherine Ferguson (educator) (1779–1854), American Sunday school teacher
- Cathy Ferguson (born 1948), American swimmer
- Cecil Ferguson (1883–1943), American baseball player
- Champ Ferguson (1821–1865), American mass murderer
- Charles Ferguson (disambiguation), multiple people
- Charley Ferguson (1939–2023), American football player
- Charlie Ferguson (disambiguation), multiple people
- Chip Ferguson (born 1967), American football player
- Chris Ferguson (born 1963), American professional poker player
- Chris Ferguson (footballer) (1907–1981), Scottish footballer
- Chris Ferguson (pastor) (born 1953), Canadian theologian
- Christine C. Ferguson (living), American academic
- Christopher Ferguson (born 1961), American astronaut
- Christopher Ferguson (psychologist) (born 1950), American psychologist
- Ciara Ferguson (born 1971), Politician from Northern Ireland
- Clarence Clyde Ferguson, Jr. (1924–1983), American ambassador and professor of law
- Claude Ferguson (1923–2006), American conservationalist
- Colen Ferguson (1900–2000), American politician
- Colin Ferguson (born 1972), Canadian-born American actor
- Connie Ferguson (born 1970), South African actress, film-maker, businesswoman and producer
- Conor Ferguson (born 1999), Irish swimmer
- Cool John Ferguson (born 1953), American blues guitarist, singer and songwriter
- Craig Ferguson (born 1962), Scottish-born American comedian, actor, writer, and television host
- Craig Ferguson (ice hockey) (born 1970), Canadian ice hockey player

==== D ====
- D'Brickashaw Ferguson (born 1983), American football player
- Dale Ferguson (designer) (living), theatrical costume designer
- Dale Ferguson (rugby league) (born 1988), English rugby league footballer
- Dallas Ferguson (born 1972), Canadian ice hockey defenceman and coach
- Dana Ferguson (born 1987), Canadian female curler
- Daniel Ferguson (disambiguation), multiple people
- Danny Ferguson (1903–1971), Welsh footballer
- Danny Ferguson (Scottish footballer) (1939–1977), Scottish footballer
- Darnell Ferguson (born 1987), American chef and restaurateur
- Darold Durard Brown Ferguson Jr. aka ASAP Ferg (born 1988), American rapper
- Darren Ferguson (born 1972), Scottish football player and manager
- Daryl Ferguson (born 1985), Barbadian footballer
- Dave Ferguson (disambiguation), multiple people
- David Ferguson (disambiguation), multiple people
- Deborah Ferguson (living), American politician
- Denise Ferguson (living), New Zealand Anglican bishop
- Dennis Ferguson (1948–2012), Australian convict
- Dennis Ferguson (politician) (born 1961), Former Democrat from Tennessee
- Denver D. Ferguson (1895–1957), American businessman, club owner and agent
- Derek Ferguson (born 1967), Scottish footballer
- Des Ferguson (1930–2021), Gaelic football player
- Desmond Ferguson (born 1977), American basketball player
- Dick Ferguson (1950–2010), American racing driver
- Don Ferguson (disambiguation), multiple people
- Donald Ferguson (disambiguation), multiple people
- Dorothy Ferguson (1923–2003), Canadian baseball player
- Doug Ferguson (ice hockey) (1943–2003), Canadian ice hockey player
- Doug Ferguson (politician) (living), Canadian politician
- Douglas Ferguson (artist) (born 1951), fashion designer
- Drew Ferguson (politician) (born 1967), American dentist and politician
- Drew Ferguson (soccer) (born 1957), Canadian soccer player-coach
- Duncan Ferguson (born 1971), Scottish footballer
- Duncan Ferguson (political activist) (1901–1974), American artist
- Dustin Ferguson (living), American filmmaker
- Dutton Ferguson (1904-1980), American editor, civil servant and civil rights activist
- Dwight Ferguson (born 1970), Bahamian sprint athlete
- Dylan Ferguson (ice hockey) (born 1998), Canadian professional ice hockey goaltender
- Dylan Ferguson (skier) (born 1988), American freestyle skier

==== E ====
- Eddie Ferguson (born 1949), Scottish footballer
- Ego Ferguson (born 1991), American football player
- Elmer Ferguson (1885–1972), Canadian sports journalist
- Elsie Ferguson (1883–1961), American stage and film actress
- Elspeth Ferguson (born 1940), English competitive swimmer
- Emi Ferguson (living), English-American flutist, performer, singer, and composer
- Emma Ferguson (born 1975), British actress
- Emory C. Ferguson (1833–1911), American politician
- Eric Ferguson (disambiguation), multiple people
- Eugene S. Ferguson (1916–2004), American engineer
- Eustace William Ferguson (1884–1927), New Zealand pathologist and entomologist
- Evan Ferguson (born 2004), Ireland, professional footballer
- Everett Ferguson (born 1933), American academic
- Ewen Ferguson (born 1996), Scottish golfer

==== F–G ====
- Fenner Ferguson (1814–1859), American politician
- Fenton Ferguson (living), Jamaican politician and dental surgeon
- Fern Ferguson (born c. 1925), American baseball player
- Forest K. Ferguson (1919–1954), American college football player, U.S. Army lieutenant, Distinguished Service Cross recipient
- Friar Ferguson, later stage name for American professional wrestler Mike Shaw (1957–2010)
- Frances Ferguson (born 1947), American academic
- Frank Ferguson (1899–1978), American actor
- Franklin La Du Ferguson (1861–1944), Second president of Pomona College
- G. E. Ferguson (1864–1897), Ghanaian scientist
- Garland Ferguson Jr. (1878–1963), federal Trade Commission chair
- Garvin Ferguson (born 1968), Bahamian swimmer
- Gary Ferguson (literature scholar) (born 1963), American professor of French
- Gary Ferguson (nature writer) (born 1956), American writer
- Gene Ferguson (born 1947), American football player
- George Ferguson (disambiguation), multiple people
- Gerald Ferguson (1937–2009), Canadian artist
- Gil Ferguson (1923–2007), American politician
- Gillian K. Ferguson (born 1965), Scottish poet, journalist
- Glenn Ferguson (born 1969), Northern Irish footballer
- Glenn W. Ferguson (1929–2007), American diplomat and academic administrator
- Gordon C. Ferguson (1895–1953), American insurance agent and politician
- Graeme Ferguson (biathlete) (born 1952), British biathlete
- Graeme Ferguson (filmmaker) (1929–2021), Canadian filmmaker and inventor
- Grant Ferguson (born 1993), British bicycle racer
- Gus Ferguson (1940–2020), cartoonist

==== H–I ====
- H-Bomb Ferguson (1929–2006), American jump blues singer
- Hannah Ferguson (born 1992), American model
- Hannah Ferguson (commentator) (born 1998), Australian political commentator
- Harley Bascom Ferguson (1875–1968), United States Army general
- Harold S. Ferguson (1851–1921), zoologist
- Harry Ferguson (1884–1960), Irish tractor designer and industrialist
- Harry Ferguson (footballer) (1907–1983), Scottish footballer
- Harvie Ferguson (born 1947), British sociologist
- Heather M. Ferguson (living), malaria vector biologist
- Helaman Ferguson (born 1940), American sculptor
- Helen Ferguson (1901–1977), American actress
- Helen Munro Ferguson, Viscountess Novar (1865–1941), charity worker
- Henry Ferguson (disambiguation), multiple people
- Homer L. Ferguson (1873–1953), American businessman
- Homer S. Ferguson (1889–1982), American politician
- Howard Ferguson (1870–1946), ninth premier of Ontario, Canada
- Howard Ferguson (composer) (1908–1999), British composer of Irish birth
- Howie Ferguson (1930–2005), American football player
- Hugh Ferguson (1863–1937), British politician
- Hugh Ferguson (footballer) (1926–1994), Northern Irish footballer
- Hughie Ferguson (1895–1930), Scottish football player
- Iain Ferguson (born 1962), Scottish football player
- Iain Ferguson (businessman) (born 1955), British businessman
- Ian Ferguson (disambiguation), multiple people
- Ion Ferguson (1913–1990), Irish soldier
- Irene Ferguson (born 1970), New Zealand artist
- Isaac Edward Ferguson (1888–1964), American political activist and attorney
- Isobelle Mary Ferguson (1926–2019), Aboriginal Australian nurse and activist, daughter of William (Bill)

==== J ====
- Jack Ferguson (disambiguation), multiple people
- Jackson Ferguson (born 1992), Australian rules footballer
- Jake Ferguson (born 1999), American football player
- James Ferguson (disambiguation), multiple people
- Jane Ferguson (born 1984), Northern Irish journalist
- Jason Ferguson (disambiguation), multiple people
- Jay Ferguson (disambiguation), multiple people
- Jaylon Ferguson (born 1995), American football player
- Jazz Ferguson (born 1997), football player
- Jazzmarr Ferguson (born 1989), American basketball player
- Jean Elsie Ferguson (1909–1979), Australian hospital matron
- Jeff Ferguson (disambiguation), multiple people
- Jennifer Ferguson (born 1961), South African singer-songwriter and political activist
- Jenny Ferguson (living), New Zealand netball player
- Jesse Ferguson (born 1957), professional boxer and United States Marine
- Jesse Tyler Ferguson (born 1975), American actor
- Jim Ferguson (disambiguation), multiple people
- Jimmy Ferguson (1940–1997), Canadian singer
- Jimmy Ferguson (footballer) (born 1935), Scottish footballer
- Jimmy Ferguson (rugby union) (1903–1992), Scottish international rugby union player
- Jock Ferguson (soccer) (1887–1973), American soccer player
- Jock Ferguson (politician) (1946–2010), Australian politician
- Joe Ferguson (disambiguation), multiple people
- Johan Jacob Ferguson (c. 1630–1691), Dutch mathematician
- John Ferguson (disambiguation), multiple people
- Jonathan Ferguson (born 1979), British firearm historian and author
- Joseph Ferguson (MP) (1788–1863), politician
- Joseph T. Ferguson (1892–1979), American politician
- Josh Ferguson (born 1993), American football player
- Julian Ferguson (1895–1965), Canadian politician
- Julie Ferguson (born 1979), Scottish footballer

==== K–L ====
- Kareem Ferguson (living), American actor
- Karen Ferguson (1941–2021), American lawyer and pension rights activist
- Kate Lee Ferguson (1841–1928), American novelist
- Kathleen Ferguson (born 1958), Northern Irish writer
- Keith Ferguson (disambiguation), multiple people
- Kelly K. Ferguson (living), American public health researcher
- Ken Ferguson (disambiguation), multiple people
- Kennan Ferguson (born 1968), American political theorist
- Kenneth Ferguson (born 1984), American sprint athlete
- Kent Ferguson (born 1963), American diver
- Kimberly Ferguson (living), politician in Massachusetts, US
- Kirby Ferguson (living), filmmaker and remixer
- Kirstin Ferguson (born 1973), Australian company director
- Kitty Ferguson (born 1941), American science writer
- Kobie Ferguson (born 1999), association football player
- Larry Ferguson (gridiron football) (1940–2015), American football player
- Larry Ferguson (politician) (1937–2025), American politician
- Larry Ferguson (screenwriter) (born 1940), American screenwriter and film director
- Laurie Ferguson (born 1952), Australian politician
- Lena Santos Ferguson (1928–2004), American secretary, civil rights activist, and clubwoman
- Leon Ferguson (1923–1989), Australian water polo player
- Leslie Ferguson (1892–1957), cricketer
- Lewis Ferguson (born 1999), Scottish association football player
- Liam Ferguson (born 1940), Irish hurler
- Lindo Ferguson (1858–1948), New Zealand ophthalmologist, university professor, and medical school dean
- Lloyd Noel Ferguson (1918–2011), American chemist
- Lockie Ferguson (born 1991), New Zealand cricketer
- Lorne Ferguson (1930–2008), Canadian ice hockey player
- Luna Ferguson (living), Canadian filmmaker
- Lynn Ferguson (born 1965), Scottish actress and writer
- Lynnette Ferguson (born 2000), New Zealand academic

==== M ====
- Maggie Ferguson (born 1952), Australian musician
- Malcolm Ferguson (living), New Zealand association footballer
- Manie Payne Ferguson (1850–1932), Irish/American founder of the Peniel Mission and hymn-writer
- Margaret Clay Ferguson (1863–1951), American botanist and botanical collector
- Margaret Ferguson (political scientist) (born 1968), American political scientist
- Marilyn Ferguson (1938–2008), American writer
- Mark Ferguson (disambiguation), multiple people
- Martin Ferguson (footballer) (born 1942), Scottish football player, manager and scout
- Marshall Ferguson (born 1991), sports broadcaster and former Canadian football quarterback
- Martin Ferguson (footballer) (born 1942), Scottish football player and manager
- Martin Ferguson (politician) (born 1953), Australian politician
- Mary Catherine Ferguson (1823–1905), Irish writer, biographer, archaeologist
- Matt Ferguson (born 1966), American businessman
- Matthew Ferguson (disambiguation), multiple people
- Max Ferguson (1924–2013), Canadian radio personality and satirist
- Max Ferguson (painter) (born 1959), American artist
- Maynard Ferguson (1928–2006), Canadian jazz trumpet player
- Megan Ferguson (born 1983), American actress
- Melissa Ferguson (living), American psychology professor
- Mephan Ferguson (1843–1919), Australian businessman
- Michael Ferguson (disambiguation), multiple people
- Mick Ferguson (born 1954), English footballer
- Mike Ferguson (disambiguation), multiple people
- Milton J. Ferguson (1879–1954), American librarian
- Miriam A. Ferguson (1875–1961), Governor of Texas
- Mitzi Ferguson (born 1959), Australian fencer
- Myles Ferguson (1981–2000), Canadian actor

==== N–P ====
- Naomi Ferguson (living), Commissioner of the New Zealand Inland Revenue Department
- Nathan Ferguson (footballer, born 1995) (born 1995), English footballer
- Nathan Ferguson (footballer, born 2000) (born 2000), English association football player
- Neil Ferguson (epidemiologist) (born 1968), British epidemiologist
- Neil Ferguson (footballer) (1945–2016), Australian rules footballer
- Niall Ferguson (born 1964), Scottish historian of British imperialism and international finance
- Nicholas Ferguson (born 1938), English artist and television director
- Nicholas Ferguson (businessman) (born 1948), British businessman
- Nick Ferguson (born 1974), Player of American and Canadian football
- Niels Ferguson (born 1965), Dutch cryptographer
- Noel Ferguson (1927–2007), Irish cricketer
- Norm Ferguson (animator) (1902–1957), American animator
- Norm Ferguson (ice hockey) (born 1945), Canadian ice hockey player
- O'Jay Ferguson (born 1993), Sprint athlete from the Bahamas
- Orlando Ferguson (1846–1911), American flat earth mapper
- Otis Ferguson (1907–1943), American critic
- Pablo Ferguson (born 1981), Argentine cricketer
- Patricia Ferguson (born 1958), Scottish politician
- Patricia Ann Ferguson (1936–2022), Scottish civil engineer
- Patrick Ferguson (1744–1780), British Army officer
- Patrick Ferguson (drummer) (living), American musician
- Paul Ferguson (born 1958), English rock drummer
- Paul Ferguson (bishop) (born 1955), British priest
- Pearson Ferguson (1909–1985), Scottish footballer
- Percy Ferguson (1880–1952), Australian politician
- Perry Ferguson (1901–1963), art director
- Phil Ferguson (1903–1978), American politician
- Porsha Ferguson (born 1989), actor
- Priah Ferguson (born 2006), American child actor

==== R ====
- R. G. Ferguson (1883–1964), Canadian physician
- Rachel Ferguson (1892–1957), British writer
- Ralph Ferguson (1929–2020), Canadian MP
- Raymond Ferguson (born 1941), Irish rugby union player
- Raymond Ferguson (cricketer) (born 1969), Jamaican cricketer
- Rebecca Ferguson (disambiguation), multiple people
- Reg Ferguson (born 1901), Australian rugby union player
- Reid Ferguson (born 1994), American football player from the United States
- Rhadi Ferguson (born 1975), American martial artist
- Rich Ferguson (athlete) (1931–1986), track athlete
- Rich Ferguson (magician) (born 1970), American magician
- Richard Ferguson (disambiguation), multiple people
- Rikki Ferguson (born 1956), Scottish footballer
- Riley Ferguson (born 1995), American football player
- Robert Ferguson (disambiguation), multiple people
- Roderick Ferguson (born 2000), American academic
- Rodney Ferguson (born 1986), American football player
- Rodwell Ferguson (born 1962), Belizean politician
- Roger W. Ferguson Jr. (born 1951), American economist, former Federal Reserve Vice Chair
- Rohan Ferguson (born 1997), association football player
- Ron Ferguson (footballer) (born 1957), English footballer
- Ron Ferguson (politician) (born 1986), American politician
- Ronald Ferguson (disambiguation), multiple people
- Rork Scott Ferguson (1884–1955), Canadian Member of Parliament
- Rosetta A. Ferguson (1920–2015), American politician
- Ross Ferguson (born 1943), New Zealand botanist
- Roy Ferguson (living), New Zealand diplomat
- Roy Ferguson (rugby league) (1945–2022), Australian rugby league footballer
- Ruby Ferguson (1899–1966), British writer
- Rufus Ferguson (born 1951), American-football player
- Russell Ferguson (living), American dancer
- Ryan Ferguson (disambiguation), multiple people

==== S ====
- Samuel Ferguson (disambiguation), multiple people
- Sandy Ferguson (1879–1919), Canadian boxer
- Sandy Ferguson (footballer) (1867–1894), footballer
- Sarah Ferguson (disambiguation), multiple people
- Sasha Ferguson (born 1996), Ugandan businesswoman, humanitarian, and former TV show host
- Scott Ferguson (ice hockey) (born 1973), Canadian National Hockey League defenseman
- Scott Ferguson (producer) (living), American film and television producer
- Shane Ferguson (born 1991), Northern Irish association football player
- Shawn Ferguson (born 1991), Professional soccer player
- Sheila Ferguson (born 1947), American lead singer of the pop group Three Degrees
- Sheniqua Ferguson (born 1989), athletics competitor
- Sherman Ferguson (1944–2006), American musician
- Shona Ferguson (1972–2021), South African actor and film producer
- Shonel Ferguson (born 1957), Bahamian sprint athlete and long jumper
- Shona Ferguson (1974–2021), Botswanan actor, executive producer and co-founder of Ferguson Films
- Simon Ferguson (born 1961), English cricketer
- Simon Ferguson (ice hockey) (born 1983), Canadian ice hockey player
- Sinclair Ferguson (born 1948), theologian
- Sir Robert Ferguson, 2nd Baronet (1796–1860), British politician
- Sophie Ferguson (born 1986), Australian female tennis player
- Stacy Ferguson (born 1975), Singer-songwriter, former member of the band the black eyed peas
- Stephen Ferguson (born 1955), Scottish film music composer
- Steven Ferguson (disambiguation), multiple people
- Stewart Ferguson (1900–1955), basketball and American-football coach of the early 20th century
- Stuart Ferguson (living), Welsh rugby union and rugby league footballer
- Stuart Ferguson (cricketer) (born 1974), American-English solicitor and cricketer
- Susan J. Ferguson (born 1962), American sociologist
- Susie Ferguson (living), New Zealand radio presenter

==== T–Z ====
- Tarkus Ferguson (born 1997), American basketball player
- Ted Ferguson (1895–1978), English footballer
- Terrance Ferguson (basketball) (born 1998), American basketball player
- Terry Ferguson (living), Gaelic football player
- Thomas Ferguson (disambiguation), multiple people
- Thompson Benton Ferguson (1857–1921), American politician
- Tim Ferguson (born 1963), Australian comedian
- Timothy R. Ferguson (born 1955), American politician
- Tom Ferguson (disambiguation), multiple people
- Tony Ferguson (born 1984), American MMA fighter
- Tony Ferguson (skateboarder) (born 1973), Canadian skateboarder
- Torin Ferguson (born 1985), association football player from the Bahamas
- Tracey Ferguson (born 1974), Canadian wheelchair basketball player
- Trevor Ferguson (born 1947), Canadian writer
- Tyler Ferguson (born 1993), American baseball player
- Vagas Ferguson (born 1957), All-American college football player, professional football player, running back
- Valma Ferguson (born 1941), Australian politician
- Verell Ferguson (1859–1923), Mississippi politician
- Vernice Ferguson (1928–2012), American nurse researcher and executive
- Virgil Ferguson (1844–1912), American lawyer and politician
- Walter Ferguson (painter) (1930–2015), American artist
- Walter Ferguson (singer-songwriter) (1919–2023), Costa Rica musician
- Warren J. Ferguson (1920–2008), American judge
- Wesley Ferguson (1922–1986), American academic
- Wilburn Ferguson (1905–1998), American alternative medicine researcher
- Wilfred Ferguson (1917–1961), West Indian cricketer
- Wilkie D. Ferguson (1938–2003), American judge
- Will Ferguson (born 1964), Canadian travel writer and novelist
- Will Ferguson (Ontario politician) (1954–2011), Canadian politician
- William Ferguson (disambiguation), multiple people
- Willie Ferguson (footballer, born 1901) (1901–1960), Scottish football player and manager
- Willie Ferguson (footballer, fl. 1895–1900) (deceased), Scottish footballer

=== Given name ===
- Ferguson Jenkins (born 1942), Canadian MLB baseball player
- Ferguson John, Caribbean politician, minister in Saint Lucia from 1997 to 2006
- Ferguson Cheruiyot Rotich (born 1989), Kenyan middle-distance runner

== Fictional characters ==
- Ferguson Darling, character on Clarissa Explains It All
- Archie "The Ferg" Ferguson, a deputy on the TV series Longmire

== See also ==
- Fergie (disambiguation)
- Fergusson (surname)

=== Individual people ===
- Maida Bryant née Ferguson (1926–2016), New Zealand nurse, local politician and community leader
- Marjorie F. Lambert née Ferguson (1908–2006), American anthropologist and archaeologist
- Jeremy Miles Ferguson aka Jinxx (born 1981), musical artist
- Kevin Ferguson aka Kimbo Slice (1974–2016), Bahamian mixed martial artist
- Robert Ferguson aka Fergie (DJ) (1979–), Northern Irish DJ and electronic music artist
- Stacy Ann Ferguson aka Fergie (singer) (born 1975), American singer-songwriter and actress
