= Henry Ferguson =

Henry Ferguson may refer to:

- Henry Ferguson (politician) (died 1791), politician in Nova Scotia
- Henry Ferguson (painter) (1665–1730), or Vergazon, Dutch painter
- Henry Augustus Ferguson (1842–1911), American landscape painter
- Henry G. Ferguson (1882–1996), American geologist
- Henry Lindo Ferguson (1858–1948), New Zealand ophthalmologist, university professor and medical school dean

== See also ==
- Harry Ferguson (1884–1960), Irish engineer and inventor
- Harry Ferguson (footballer), Scottish footballer
