= William Ferguson =

William Ferguson may refer to:

== Arts ==
- William Ferguson (tenor), operatic tenor, see The Tempest
- William Gouw Ferguson, Scottish painter of still life
- William J. Ferguson (1845–1930), American actor and witness to Abraham Lincoln's assassination
- Will Ferguson (born 1964), Canadian writer

== Sportspeople ==
- Bill Ferguson (American football) (born 1951), NFL linebacker
- Bill Ferguson (cricket scorer) (1880–1957)
- Willie Ferguson (footballer, born 1901) (1901–1960), Scottish footballer with Chelsea and Queen of the South
- Willie Ferguson (footballer, fl. 1895–1900), Scottish footballer with Celtic, Burnley and Manchester City
- William Ferguson (racing driver) (1940–2007), in Formula One competitions
- William Ferguson (rugby union), Scotland international rugby union player
- Billy Ferguson (1938–1998), Northern Irish footballer

== Politicians ==
=== Australia ===
- William Ferguson (1891–1961), NSW, Australia politician (1953–1961)
- William John Ferguson (1859–1935), NSW, Australia politician (1894–1904)

=== Canada ===
- Will Ferguson (Ontario politician) (1954–2011), Ontario, Canada politician
- William Ferguson (Manitoba politician) (1862–1936), Canadian politician

=== United States ===
- Bill Ferguson (politician) (born 1983), Maryland state senator
- William Webb Ferguson (1857–1910), Michigan state representative
- William M. Ferguson (1917–2005), American politician, attorney general of Kansas

== Others ==
- William Ferguson (Australian Aboriginal leader) (1882–1950), Indigenous Australian leader
- William Ferguson (botanist) (1820–1887), British botanist and entomologist
- William Ferguson (engineer) (1852–1935), New Zealand civil engineering manager and consultant
- William Ferguson (historian) (1924–2021), Scottish historian
- William Ferguson of Kinmundy (1823-1904) Chairman of the Great North of Scotland Railway
- William Ferguson (Los Angeles pioneer) (1822–1910), settler
- William Ferguson (Australian pioneer) (c. 1809–1892) early settler of South Australia
- William C. Ferguson (1930–2015), American telecommunications expert, chairman and CEO of NYNEX
- William R. Ferguson (1900–1967), UFO religion leader and fraudster
- William Scott Ferguson (1875–1954), Canadian–American historian, president of the American Historical Association
- William Ferguson (1800–1828), Irish soldier of Irish military diaspora, aide-de-camp to General Simon Bolívar in Hispanoamerican wars of Independence

== See also ==
- Sir William Fergusson, 1st Baronet (1808–1877), Scottish surgeon
- William Fergusson (physician) (1773–1846), Scottish inspector-general of military hospitals and medical writer
- William Fergusson (politician), NSW, Australia politician (1880–1887)
- William Fergusson (colonial administrator) (c. 1795–1846), British Jamaican medical doctor and governor of Sierra Leone
- Ferguson (name)
