= Rich Ferguson =

Rich Ferguson may refer to:

- Rich Ferguson (runner) (1931–1986), Canadian middle-distance runner
- Rich Ferguson (magician) (born 1970), American magician
