= Fergusson (surname) =

Fergusson is a surname. Notable people with the name include:

- Adam Fergusson (disambiguation), multiple people
- Alex Fergusson (disambiguation), multiple people
- Ben Fergusson (born 1980), British writer
- Bernard Fergusson (1911–1980), former British Army officer and Governor-General of New Zealand
- Charles Fergusson (1865–1951), former British Army officer and Governor-General of New Zealand
- Charles Bruce Fergusson (1911–1978), third Provincial Archivist of Nova Scotia
- Clan Fergusson, a Scottish clan
- Francis Fergusson (1904–1986), American academic and critic
- Frances D. Fergusson (born 1944), former president of Vassar College
- George Fergusson (diplomat) (born 1955), British High Commissioner to New Zealand
- Harvey Fergusson (1890–1971), American writer
- Harvey B. Fergusson (1848–1915), former American Congressman
- James Fergusson (disambiguation), multiple people
- Jean Fergusson (1944–2019), British television and theatre actress
- John Duncan Fergusson (1874–1961), Scottish artist
- Muriel McQueen Fergusson (1899–1997), former Canadian Senator and Speaker of the Senate
- Robert Fergusson (1750–1774), Scottish poet
- Rod Fergusson, Canadian video game producer
- William Fergusson (1808–1877), Scottish surgeon

== See also ==
- Ferguson (name)
