= Richard Ferguson =

Richard Ferguson may refer to:

- Richard Ferguson (highwayman) (died 1800), English highwayman
- Richard Ferguson (barrister) (1935–2009), barrister and politician from Northern Ireland
- Richard Saul Ferguson (1837–1900), English antiquary
- Dick Ferguson (1950–2010), American racing driver
- Rich Ferguson (magician) (born 1970), American magician, entertainer, inventor and creative consultant
- Rich Ferguson (runner) (1931–1986), Canadian athlete
- R. Brian Ferguson (born 1951), American anthropologist

== See also ==
- Richard Ferguson-Hull, American animation director
