= Arthur Ferguson =

Arthur Ferguson may refer to:

- Arthur Ferguson (police officer) (1862–1935), British soldier and police officer
- Arthur Ferguson (footballer) (1887–1969), Australian rules footballer
- Arthur M. Ferguson (1877–1922), Medal of Honor recipient
- Arthur D. Ferguson (1869–1928), banker and philatelist
- Arthur Foxton Ferguson (1866–1920), English baritone, lecturer, and German translator

== See also ==
- Arthur Furguson (1883–1938), Scottish con artist
