= Hannah Ferguson (disambiguation) =

Hannah Ferguson (born 1992) is an American model.

Hannah Ferguson may also refer to:

- Hannah Ferguson (commentator) (born 1998), Australian political commentator, author, and social media personality
- Hannah Ferguson, fictional character portrayed by Ellen Burstyn in the 1996 film the Spitfire Grill

== See also ==
- Anna Ferguson (active from 2026), American politician
