= Martin Ferguson =

Martin Ferguson may refer to:

- Martin Ferguson (footballer) (born 1942), Scottish footballer
- Martin Ferguson (politician) (born 1953), Australian politician
