= Anne Ferguson =

Ann(e) Ferguson may refer to:

- Anne Ferguson (judge), Chief Justice of Victoria
- Ann Ferguson (born 1938), American philosopher
- Anne Ferguson (physician) (1941–1998), Scottish gastroenterologist
- Anne Ferguson-Smith (born 1961), Mammalian developmental geneticist
- Patricia Ann Ferguson, Scottish engineer
