= Thomas Fergusson =

Thomas Fergusson may refer to:

- Thomas Riversdale Colyer-Fergusson
- Sir Thomas Colyer Colyer-Fergusson, 3rd Baronet (1865–1951) of the Colyer-Fergusson baronets

== See also ==
- Thomas Ferguson (disambiguation)
- Fergusson (disambiguation)
