= Daniel Ferguson (disambiguation) =

Daniel Ferguson is a filmmaker.

Daniel Ferguson may also refer to:

- Daniel C. Ferguson (born 1927), American businessman
- Daniel Ferguson (voice actor) (born 1993), American voice actor
- Danny Ferguson (1903–1971), Welsh footballer
- Danny Ferguson (Scottish footballer) (1939–1977), Scottish footballer
