= Bruce Ferguson =

Bruce Ferguson may refer to:

- Bruce Ferguson (Australian Army officer) (1917–1988), Australian Army officer
- Bruce Ferguson (RNZAF officer) (born 1949), Royal New Zealand Air Force officer
- Bruce Walker Ferguson (born 1954), educator, entrepreneur and lawyer
- Bruce Ferguson (rugby union) (born 1969), Fijian-born Japanese rugby union player
- Bruce K. Ferguson, American landscape architect, author, and educator
