= Ronald Ferguson =

Ronald Ferguson or Ron Ferguson may refer to:

- Ron Ferguson (footballer) (born 1957), English footballer
- Ron Ferguson (politician) (born 1986), Ohio state representative
- Ronald Ferguson (polo) (1931–2003), English polo manager
- Ronald Ferguson (economist) (born 1950), American economist
- Ronald Ferguson Thomson (1830–1888), British diplomat
- Ronald Craufurd Ferguson (1773–1841), Scottish army officer and Member of Parliament
