= Matthew Ferguson (disambiguation) =

Matthew Ferguson is an actor.

Matthew Ferguson may also refer to:

- Matthew Ferguson (Scottish footballer) (c. 1873–1902), Scottish footballer
- Matthew Ferguson (Australian footballer) (born 1984), former Australian rules footballer
- Matthew Paul Ferguson (born 1958), rock drummer
- Matt Kennon (Matthew Carl Ferguson), American country music singer and songwriter
- Matt Ferguson (born 1966), CEO
