= Henry Ferguson (painter) =

Dutch painter

Henry Ferguson, or Vergazon (c.1655 – 1730), was a Dutch Golden Age painter.

== Biography ==
He was born in The Hague as the son of William Gowe Ferguson. He worked for a short time in England, because Horace Walpole wrote that he was "a Dutch painter of ruins and landscapes, with which he sometimes was called to adorn the backgrounds of Kneller's pictures, though his colouring was reckoned too dark. He painted a few small portraits, and died in France". He travelled with Adriaen van der Kabel via Lyon to Toulouse, where he later died.
