= Butch Lewis Act =

Financial US Congress act

- Long title: To provide relief for multiemployer and single employer pension plans, and for other purposes.
- Enacted by: the 117th United States Congress
- Effective: March 11, 2021

Citations
- Public law: Pub. L. 117–2 (text) (PDF)
- Statutes at Large: 135 Stat. 4

Codification
- Acts amended: Employee Retirement Income Security Act of 1974 (ERISA), Internal Revenue Code
- Titles amended: 26, 29

Legislative history
- Introduced in the Senate as S. 547 by D‑OH Sherrod Brownth on March 2, 2021; Committee consideration by Senate Committee on Finance; Passed the House on February 27, 2021 (Passed as part of H.R. 1319); Passed the Senate on March 6, 2021 (Passed as part of H.R. 1319); Agreed to by the House on March 10, 2021 (Concurred with Senate amendments to H.R. 1319); Signed into law by President Joe Biden on March 11, 2021

The Butch Lewis Act is an act of the United States Congress that would allow the United States Treasury to provide financial assistance to failing multiemployer pension plans. This assistance would come in the form of grants that would not need to be repaid to the Department of Treasury and would allow retirees to receive the entirety of their pension benefits.

== Purpose and content ==
Many multiemployer pension plans across the United States are on the verge of insolvency. According to the Pension Benefit Guarantee Corporation, "A multiemployer plan is a collectively bargained plan maintained by more than one employer, usually within the same or related industries, and a labor union". Industries included in multiemployer pension plans currently include trucking and transportation, retail, manufacturing, mining and entertainment. While working in a union, employees barter compensation and benefits with their employer, often trading in raises or higher pay for a retirement plan. These plans started to fail for multiple reasons, including but not limited to: industries going bankrupt and not following through with financial obligations, past surpluses causing fragile bursts of benefit withdraws, failed stock market investments, government deregulation, and the 2008 economic crisis. Underfunded multiemployer pensions currently threaten the retirement plans of 1-1.5 million workers across the United States.

Multiemployer pension plans have their own arm of the federal government called the Pension Benefit Guaranty Corporation, which was created to insure pension benefits. However, these pension programs owe approximately $66 billion to retired workers and only have about $3 billion in revenue, giving the insurance fund until 2026 before it is drained completely.

The current Butch Lewis Act provides a bailout to fund multi-employer pension plans for 30 years. The bill restores pensions to their full amount and increases the national pension insurance cap. Finally, it requires regular reports to Congress on the status of these pension plans as a preventative measure against future collapse.

In 2017, U.S. Senator Sherrod Brown named this piece of legislation after late Ohioan Estil "Butch" Lewis. Lewis was an Ohio native and Vietnam War veteran, who was the former president of the Teamsters Local 100 union in Cincinnati. Lewis became an activist after the Multiemployer Pension Reform Act of 2014 threatened massive cuts to pensions plans. He volunteered to organize and advocate on behalf of his fellow union workers and retirees, working with public officials and the Pension Rights Center to enact counter-legislation to the 2014 benefit cuts. Butch Lewis died of a stroke in 2015 as a result of the stress of the pension crisis.

== Legislative history ==
The Butch Lewis Act was originally introduced in 2017 in the 115th Congress as S. 2147 where it died in committee. It was then introduced in 2019 in the 116th Congress as S. 2254 where it died, again, in committee. Both versions of this bill would have created a new division of the United States Treasury to solely deal with the multiemployer pension crisis. This new office, the Pension Rehabilitation Administration, would have given low interest loans funded by taxes to multiemployer pensions in order to remain solvent.

The bill was then introduced again in 2021 during the 117th Congress in its current form. It was renamed the Butch Lewis Emergency Pension Plan Relief Act of 2021 (S. 547). This version of the bill was included as a part of the American Rescue Plan, Congress' 1.9 trillion dollar economic relief package in response to the COVID-19 pandemic. The American Rescue Plan, including the Butch Lewis Emergency Pension Plan Relief Act, passed the House on February 27, 2021, the Senate on March 6, 2021, and was signed into law by President Joe Biden on March 11, 2021.

== Public response ==
=== Support ===
Many union chapters, such as the International Brotherhood of Teamsters, United Steelworkers, and International Brotherhood of Electrical Workers across the nation support the Butch Lewis Act. In 2021, the U.S. Chamber of Commerce endorsed the Butch Lewis Act. The bill has the support of non profits like the Pension Rights Center and AARP, along with the support of public officials like Senator Sherrod Brown (D-OH), Rep. Tim Ryan (D-OH), and Rep. Marcy Kaptur (D-OH). Those in favor believe it is the government's duty to fund these pensions. They also remind the public that retirees are not looking for a handout with this bill, but rather the benefits that were negotiated and promised to them throughout their careers.

=== Opposition ===
Organizations like Citizens Against Government Waste and the National Taxpayers Union Foundation have opposed the bill in the past. The bill was also opposed by public officials such as Rep. Anthony Gonzalez (R-OH), Senator Rob Portman (R-OH), Senator Chuck Grassley (R-IA) and Senator Lamar Alexander (R-TN). A common criticism of the Butch Lewis Act is that the bailout bill does not address the structural issues that are causing the pensions to fail. Alternative solutions provided by the opposition include increasing retirement plan premiums and taxes.
