= Jason Ferguson =

Jason Ferguson may refer to:

- Jason Ferguson (American football), American football defensive tackle
- Jason Ferguson (snooker player), English former snooker player and current chairman of the WPBSA
- Jason Ferguson (writer), American writer and producer
