= Karen Ferguson =

American lawyer and pension rights activist (1941–2021)

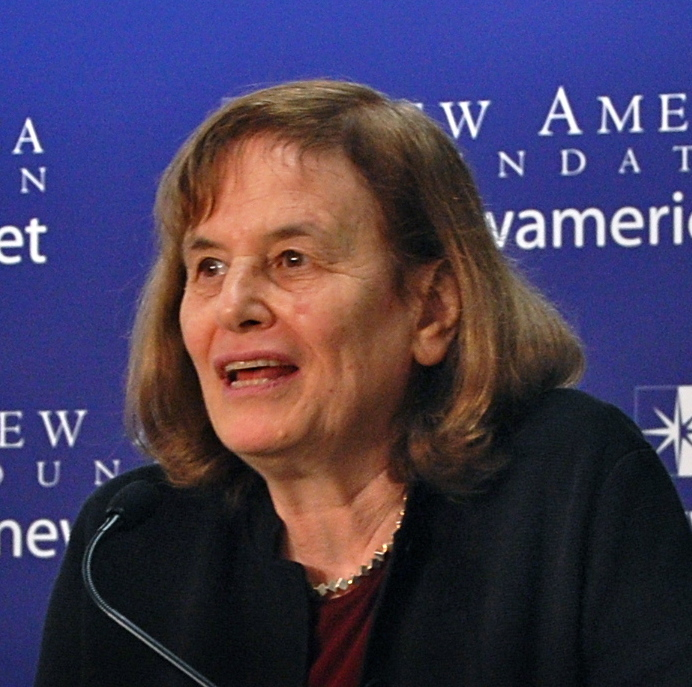
- Karen Ferguson in 2011
- Born: Karen Ruth Willner; February 17, 1941; Manhattan
- Died: December 23, 2021 (aged 80); Washington, D.C.
- Alma mater: Bryn Mawr College; Harvard Law School

Karen Ruth Ferguson (born Willner; February 17, 1941 – December 23, 2021) was an American workers' rights advocate. She was the founder and leader of the Pension Rights Center.

== Early life and education ==
Karen Ruth Willner was born on February 17, 1941, in Manhattan, New York, to Dorothy (Kunin) and Sidney Willner. She received a degree in philosophy from Bryn Mawr College in 1962 and graduated from Harvard Law School in 1965.

== Career ==
In the early 1970s, Ferguson worked with a group of young lawyers led by consumer advocate Ralph Nader known as Nader’s Raiders. Nader would try to get his "raiders" interested in different subject areas, but he could only find Ferguson who wanted to take an interest in pensions.

Ferguson became a consultant for the United Mine Workers of America. During her time there, she learned that corporate interest groups planned to undermine the Employee Retirement Income Security Act of 1974. She told Nader about the issue and he gave her $10,000 to fight for the rights of pensioners.

With the money from Nader, Ferguson founded the Pension Rights Center in 1976. Nader later contributed another $30,000. The center is a nonprofit consumer advocacy organization established to protect the pensions of retirees.

The center acts as a legal clearinghouse, referring citizens with potential litigation to lawyers.

Ferguson helped draft and pass the Retirement Equity Act of 1984 which strengthened the position of a pensioner's partner. Partners had a legal right to benefits after the death of the pensioner and these rights could not easily be waived away.

She was known for being involved in all aspects of American pension law at the time and this included helping to draft and pass the Butch Lewis Act. The bill, part of the American Rescue Plan Act, created a federal assistance program for failing multiemployer pension funds.

== Personal life ==
Karen married John H. Ferguson after meeting him in law school. Together, they had a son.

She died of colon cancer on December 23, 2021, in Washington, D.C.

== Books ==
- with Kate Blackwell The Pension Book: What You Need to Know to Prepare for Retirement (Arcade Publishing, distributed by Little, Brown, 1995)
- with Kate Blackwell Pensions in Crisis: Why the System is Failing America and How You Can Protect Your Future (Arcade Publishing, distributed by Little, Brown, 1995)
