= Lorin Hitt =

American economist

Lorin M. Hitt is an American economist, currently the Zhang Jingdong Professor of Operations, Information and Decisions at the Wharton School of the University of Pennsylvania. He received his BS and MS in electrical engineering from Brown University and his PhD in management from MIT.

== Bibliography ==
- Matt Ferguson; Lorin M. Hitt; Prasanna Tambe (November 15, 2013). The Talent Equation: Big Data Lessons for Navigating the Skills Gap and Building a Competitive Workforce. McGraw Hill Professional. ISBN 978-0-07-182713-3.
