= Donald Ferguson =

Donald Ferguson may refer to:

- Donald Ferguson (politician) (1839–1909), Canadian politician
- Donald Ferguson (cyclist) (born 1931), American cyclist
- Donald F. Ferguson (born 1960), Dell executive
- Don Ferguson (Victorian politician) (born 1907), Australian politician

== See also ==
- Don Ferguson (disambiguation)
- Ferguson (name)
