= Ferguson John =

Saint Lucian politician

Theophilus Ferguson John is a Saint Lucian politician. From 1997 until 2006 he was the parliamentary representative for Choiseul and Saltibus and the Minister for Physical Development, Environment and Housing of Saint Lucia. He is also the vice chairman of the Saint Lucia Labour Party.
