= Kathleen Ferguson =

Irish author

Kathleen Ferguson (born 19 August 1958 in Tamnaherin, County Londonderry) is an Irish author known for The Maid's Tale which won the 1995 Irish Times Literature Prize for fiction. Educated at the University of Ulster at Coleraine. It was praised by the London Independent for its "wonderful candour" and the "lovely Derry idiom".

Kathleen Ferguson is married and lives in Rome, Italy.

== Published works ==
- The Maid's Tale. Torc. 1994. ISBN 978-1-898142-04-1.
- Waiting for Dad (1998)
- Storia di una perpetua (2001)
- Xuanzang: Chinese Hero (2005)
