= Don Ferguson =

Don Ferguson may refer to:

- Don Ferguson (actor) (born 1946), Canadian actor and comedian
- Don Ferguson (South Australian politician) (1936–2013)
- Don Ferguson (Victorian politician) (1907–1987)
- Don Ferguson (Canadian politician), Green Party of Canada candidate during the 2004 Canadian federal election
- Don Ferguson (soccer) (born 1963), Canadian soccer goalkeeper
- J. Don Ferguson (1933–2008), sometimes credited as "Don Ferguson", American character actor

== See also ==
- Don Fergusson (1912–1970), Australian rower
- Donald Ferguson (disambiguation)
- Ferguson (name)
