= Pension Rights Center =

American nonprofit consumer advocacy organization

- Founded: 1976
- Founder: Karen Ferguson
- Purpose: Pensions
- Location: Washington, D.C.
- Region served: United States
- Method: education, advocacy
- Website: pensionrights.org

The Pension Rights Center is a nonprofit consumer advocacy organization established in 1976. Its stated mission is "to protect and promote the retirement security of American workers, retirees and their families."

== Background ==
Karen Ferguson became a consultant for the United Mine Workers of America where she learned that corporate interest groups planned to undermine the new Employee Retirement Income Security Act of 1974. She told Ralph Nader about the issue and he gave her $10,000 to fight for the rights of pensioners.

With the money from Nader, Ferguson founded the Pension Rights Center in 1976. Nader later contributed another $30,000. The center is a nonprofit consumer advocacy organization established to protect the pensions of retirees.

The Center provides information, referrals, and legal assistance to individuals, provides legal training to attorneys, and advocates on policy issues related to retirement income from a workers' and consumers' perspective.

Since 1993, the center has received support from the Administration on Aging to provide technical assistance and training to six regional pension counseling projects that serve 29 states free of charge. These regional pension counseling projects assist individuals who have questions about their retirement plan. The center's website includes fact sheets about retirement income issues and summaries of legislation, regulations, and court cases. The center also operates PensionHelp America, an online legal referral service.

The Center files comments on proposed government regulations, testifies before congressional committees, and coordinates Retirement USA, an initiative to promote new ideas for a retirement system in the United States.

== Funding ==
The Pension Rights Center receives funding from the U.S. Administration on Aging, The Atlantic Philanthropies, Retirement Research Foundation, AARP, and individuals.

== See also ==
- Employee Benefits Security Administration
- Elder law
- United States Senate Special Committee on Aging
- PBGC
