= Saltibus, Saint Lucia =

- Village
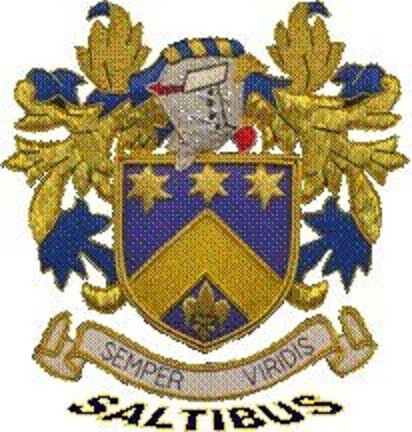
- Logo
- Interactive map of Saltibus, Saint Lucia
- Coordinates: 13°48′2″N 60°59′57″W
- Country: Saint Lucia
- Quarter: Saltibus, Laborie
- From the United Kingdom: 22 February 1979

Government
  - Type: Parliamentary democracy and Constitutional monarchy
  - Monarch: Elizabeth II
  - Governor-General: Dame Pearlette Louisy
  - Prime Minister: Stephenson King

Area
  - Total: 17.1 sq mi (44.3 km^{2})
  - Land: 17.0 sq mi (44.0 km^{2})
  - Water: 0.15 sq mi (0.4 km^{2})
  - Rank: 193rd
- Elevation: 791 ft (241 m)

Population
  - Total: 1,690
  - Density: 99.5/sq mi (38.4/km^{2})
  - estimate: 727
- Time zone: Standard (ECT)
- ZIP codes: 00110-5000
- Area code: 455

Saltibus is a village located on southwestern side of the Island of Saint Lucia. The village is located northeast of the village of Choiseul, northwest of the village of Laborie, and about 27 km south of Castries, the nation's capital. Saltibus is located in a rain-forest and is well known for its rich fertile soil and its fresh running water. There are a series of waterfalls with heights from 3 to 10 meters in the rain-forest. Saltibus contains the main water dam which supplies water to the community and several neighboring communities. The economy is largely based on agriculture, in the form of bananas, cocoa, and other tropical produce.

== History ==
St. Lucia's first known inhabitants were the Arawaks, believed to have come from northern South America in 200–400 A.D. Numerous archaeological sites on the island have produced specimens of the Arawaks' well-developed pottery. Caribs gradually replaced Arawaks during the period from 800 to 1000 A.D. Europeans first landed on the island in either 1492 or 1502 during Spain's early exploration of the Caribbean. The Dutch, English, and French all tried to establish trading outposts on St. Lucia in the 17th century but faced opposition from the Caribs. The English, with their headquarters in Barbados, and the French, based in Martinique, found St. Lucia attractive after the sugar industry developed in the 18th century. Britain eventually triumphed, with France permanently ceding St. Lucia in 1815.

== People ==
Saltibus population is predominantly of African and mixed African-European descent, with some East Indian and European minorities. English is the official language, although many or everyone speak French or Patois. Ninety percent of the population is Roman Catholic, a further reflection of early French influence on the island. The population of just over 1690 is evenly divided between urban and rural areas which include communities like Daban, Park Estate, Gayabois, Gertrine and Giraud.

== Geography ==
Saltibus is located 13°48′2″N 60°59′57″W. Average elevation: 241m above sea level. There many Geographic features in and around Saltibus. Mountain an elevation standing high above the surrounding area with small summit area, steep slopes and local relief of 300m or more.

- Mount Belvidere (3 km)from Saltibus
- Mount Grand Magazin (3 km) from Saltibus
- Mount Gimie (8.9 km) from Saltibus

Hill a rounded elevation of limited extent rising above the surrounding land with local relief of less than 300m.

- Mount Cok

River/Stream a body of running water moving to a lower level in a channel on land.

- Saltibus River
- Daban River
- Saltibus Cold Springs
- Daban Springs

Bay a coastal indentation between two capes or headlands, larger than a cove but smaller than a gulf.

- Balembouche Bay (9.3 km) from Saltibus

== Gallery ==
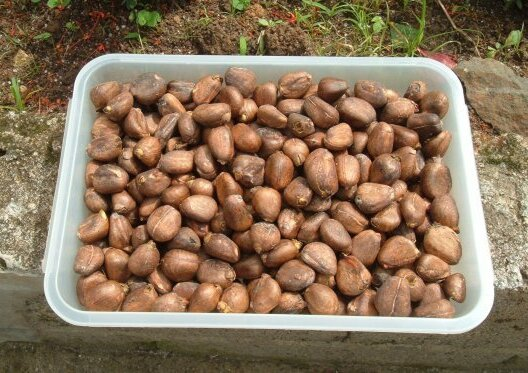
BreadNut.

Cherries picked fresh.

St.Lucia most loved mango - Mango Mang tree in Saltibus.

== Weather ==
Weather in Saltibus is tropical, moderated by northeast trade winds; dry season January to April, rainy season May to August.

== Demographics ==
As of the census of 2001, there were 727 people,188 households, and 80 families residing in the village. The racial makeup of the city was 76.41% African-European, 13.50% East Indian, 0.34% Native American, 0.01% Asian, 0.06% Pacific Islander, 5.10% from European, and 2.16% from two or more races. Hispanic or Latino of any race were 3.32% of the population.

There were 473 households, out of which had a female and males. The average household size was 3.09 and the average family size was 4.00.

== Government ==
The twentieth century saw St. Lucia's gradual transition to self-governance. Representative government was introduced in 1924 when a constitution was established. Following the dissolution, St. Lucia immediately agreed to become an associated state of Britain, which entailed a mutually sanctioned relationship that could be dissolved at any time by either party. St. Lucia was granted full control over its local government, with Britain retaining responsibility for foreign affairs and national defense. This arrangement lasted until 1975, when members of the West Indies Associated States chose to pursue independence at their discretion and convenience (see: The West Indies Federation, ch. 1). Following three years of planning and deliberation, St. Lucia gained independence on February 22, 1979. St. Lucia achieved full independence in ceremonies boycotted by the opposition St. Lucia Labour Party, which had advocated a referendum before cutting ties with Britain. The United Workers Party (UWP), then in power, called for new elections and was defeated by the St. Lucia Labour Party (SLP). The UWP was returned to power in the elections of 1982, 1987, and 1992. The United Workers Party (UWP) was once the dominant force in the politics of St. Lucia. Until 1997, John Compton was premier of St. Lucia from 1964 until independence in February 1979 and remained prime minister until elections later that year. The St. Lucia Labour Party (SLP) won the first post-independence elections in July 1979, taking 12 of 17 seats in parliament. The United Workers Party won an upset victory in elections held December 11, 2006, taking 11 seats against 6 won by the St. Lucia Labour Party. Sir John Compton once again returned to the position of Prime Minister, as well as Minister of Finance.

Depending on the Political Party in Power United Workers Party (UWP) or Saint Lucia Labour Party (SLP), Saltibus is represented under Choiseul Quarter or Laborie Quarter. See: (The Library of Congress Country Studies)

== Economy ==
St. Lucia's economy depends primarily on revenue from tourism and banana production, with some contribution from small-scale manufacturing. But Saltibus economy is largely based on agriculture (bananas, cocoa, and other tropical products are exported).A small present also comes from the only spring water bottling plant. Although banana revenues have helped fund the community's development since the 1960s, the industry is now in a terminal decline, due to competition from lower-cost Latin American banana producers and soon-to-be reduced European Union trade preferences. The community is encouraging farmers to plant crops such as cocoa, mangos, and avocados to diversify its agricultural production and provide jobs for displaced banana workers.

== Local attractions ==
- Saltibus Waterfall Trail North of Choiseul, near the village of Saltibus is a rainforest trail leading to Saltibus Waterfall. This is a series of five waterfalls with heights from 3 to 10 meters.

== Festivals ==
La Woz ("The Rose") and La Magwit ("The Marguerite") – the first's representing the Rosicrucian order, and the second's representing Freemasonry.[9] This can be seen on a mural painted by Dunstan St. Omer, depicting the holy trinity of Osiris, Horus and Isis. Preparations for the yearly festivals begin several months before the actual feast day. Each group holds "séances". These consist of all night singing and dancing sessions where drinks are sold and games are played. The central figure at the "séances" is the shatwel or lead singer who sustains the spirit and tenor of the entertainment. Most groups have one outstanding shatwel. They are usually female. On the actual day of the festival all members of the society dress in the finery of their respective roles and march to Church for a service which precedes their parade through the streets before returning to the hall for their feasting or grande fete.

Carnival – Traditionally in common with other Caribbean countries, Saint Lucia held a carnival before Lent in association with Mardi Gras. In 1999, the government moved Carnival to mid-July to avoid competing with the much larger Trinidad and Tobago carnival. It wanted to attract more overseas visitors. In May 2009, St. Lucians commemorated the 150th Anniversary of East Indian Heritage on the island, the first of its annual celebration.

== Local language ==
- English: English is now the island's first language and is taught in school but is not more dominant than Patois.
- French: Nearly all the population speaks French or a form of French-based Creole as their first language.
- Patois: In Saltibus everyone speak a local language called Patois which was the first language spoke on the entire island. Patois is a French word meaning a regional or very local language. A French synonym of 'un patois' is 'un parler'.
