= Sarah Ferguson (disambiguation) =

Sarah Ferguson (born 1959) is the former wife of Andrew Mountbatten-Windsor (formerly Prince Andrew, Duke of York).

Sarah Ferguson may also refer to:

- Sarah Ferguson (politician) (1942–2022), Jersey politician
- Sarah Ferguson (journalist) (born 1965), Australian journalist
- Sarah Jane Ferguson (born 1935), American former baseball player
- Sarah Ferguson, who took part in the death of Lucas Leonard

== See also ==
- Sarah (disambiguation)
- Ferguson (disambiguation)
