= Stephen Ferguson =

Scottish musician, composer and producer

Stephen Ferguson is a Scottish musician, composer and producer living in Vienna. Ferguson has since the early 1980s composed and produced film and movie scores, and has been praised as a composer of "undisputed originality".

== Education ==
Ferguson studied classical piano in London, musicology (Ph.D.) at the University of Vienna and holds a master's degree in music analysis. Through his music producing background, Ferguson has attained a reputation as a technologically advanced musician, an additional skill that has offered him employment as an IT expert, such at the University of Vienna's Department of English in the early 2000s.

== Compositions ==
His compositions have been commissioned, among others, by the Edinburgh Festival, Ars Electronica (Austria), Salzburger Festspiele, WDR, BBC, King's Lynn Festival, Musikverein Wien, ORF - Austrian Broadcasting Corporation, steirischer herbst.

== Discography (as solo artist) ==
Stephen Ferguson: Multitracks, Blackplastic LP 07124 (1983)

Stephen Ferguson: Piano Music, Extraplatte CD 850 088 (1988)

Stephen Ferguson: Piano Wind Brass, Extraplatte CD EX 112 090 (1990)

== Current projects ==
aAmplify, operational since 2000, is a digital music and productions site. In 2009/10, the project was showcased in an exhibit in Vienna's House of Music. The project, sponsored by the City of Vienna's Cultural Office, maintains as its raison-d'etre to "demonstrate Vienna's commitment to the third millenium's non-commercial music and developments in streaming media".

== Instruments played (incomplete) ==
EMS Synthi 100
