= Melissa Ferguson =

American psychology professor

Melissa J. Ferguson is an American professor of psychology and was a Senior Associate Dean of Social Sciences at Cornell University before becoming a professor at Yale University in 2020. She is known for her work on how people form and evolve their interpretations of social events, and how people recognize and evaluate information like fake news. Ferguson's research shows that information consumers can avoid misinformation by focusing on the quality of its source.

University of Chicago postdoctoral researcher Stav Atir authored a 2018 study with Ferguson that was published in Proceedings of the National Academy of Sciences of the United States of America. The study examined the tendency for people to refer to male professionals by their last names far more often than female professionals. The research suggests that the practice of referring to a professional by only their last name confers greater authority and fame, thus placing women at a disadvantage.

Ferguson led the 2019 implementation of the Cornell Center for Social Sciences, a public policy organization, with Christopher Wildeman.

== Education ==
- Ph.D. 2002 Psychology, New York University Major area: Social Psychology Concentration: Quantitative Psychology
- M.S. 1997 Psychology, The Pennsylvania State University
- B.A. 1994 Psychology, University of Vermont

== Selected publications ==
- Bargh, John A.; Ferguson, Melissa J. (2000). "Beyond behaviorism: On the automaticity of higher mental processes". Psychological Bulletin. 126 (6): 925–945. doi:10.1037/0033-2909.126.6.925. PMID 11107883.
- Swim, Janet K.; Hyers, Lauri L.; Cohen, Laurie L.; Ferguson, Melissa J. (January 2001). "Everyday Sexism: Evidence for Its Incidence, Nature, and Psychological Impact From Three Daily Diary Studies". Journal of Social Issues. 57 (1): 31–53. doi:10.1111/0022-4537.00200.
- Ferguson, Melissa J.; Bargh, John A. (2004). "Liking Is for Doing: The Effects of Goal Pursuit on Automatic Evaluation". Journal of Personality and Social Psychology. 87 (5): 557–572. doi:10.1037/0022-3514.87.5.557. PMID 15535771.
