= Gillian K. Ferguson =

Scottish poet and journalist

- Born: 1965 (age 60–61)
- Occupations: Poet; journalist; columnist; reviewer; media consultant
- Website: The Human Genome: Poems of the Book of Life

Gillian K. Ferguson (born 1965) is a Scottish poet and journalist, born and living in Edinburgh, Scotland. She is the creator of Air for Sleeping Fish (Bloodaxe) and the best-seller, Baby: Poems on Pregnancy, Birth and Babies (Canongate, 2001). She won a £25,000 Creative Scotland Award and created a major poetry project exploring the human genome called The Human Genome: Poems on the Book of Life, About her project, she said, "the Genome has remained fascinating throughout; a fantastic, beautiful poem - a magnificent work of Chemistry spanning four billion years of the art of Evolution." The project was praised, including by broadcaster, Andrew Marr of the BBC, Francis Collins, Head of the US Human Genome Project and by philosopher Mary Midgley author of Science and Poetry (Routledge).

She has won three writer's bursaries from the Scottish Arts Council (now Creative Scotland). Her most recent work is Flora: The Evolution of Eden about man's genetic connection and common ancestor with plants and flowers. In 2015, she suffered a severe stroke and writes while still in recovery.

== Education ==
She holds an honours degree from the University of Edinburgh in Philosophy, specializing in Aesthetics and Metaphysics.

== Work history ==
After graduation, she worked as a tutor for Open University, an illustrator, and a jewelry-maker. As a journalist, she was a columnist and features writer at national papers in Scotland; mainly The Scotsman, where she was also a book and television reviewer, and Scotland on Sunday, where she was the television critic and had a celebrity interview column. She also wrote a short humorous column, '‘This Week’' for the Financial Times weekend magazine, and reviewed events in Scotland for BBC Radio 2 arts programme. She regularly contributed columns to John Peel's BBC Radio 4's Home Truths.

She was a media consultant for nearly ten years at Save the Children Scotland. She was co-director of a small media company specialising in charities and not-for-profits, with clients including the Disasters Emergency Committee (DEC) and Make Poverty History.

She co-founded Poetryzoo.com, a global digital platform for the creation and showcasing of poetry at all levels.

She served as a judge in the Edwin Morgan International Poetry Competition. She also judged for the National Poetry Day Poems for Postcards Competition, in the Faber/Ottakars Poetry Competition, and the Creative Scotland Awards.

== Publications and digital projects ==
- Air for Sleeping Fish (Bloodaxe, 1997), shortlisted for the Scottish First Book of the Year award
- Baby: Poems on Pregnancy, Birth and Babies (Canongate, UK; Grove Atlantic, US, 2001). She did a promotional edition with BabyGAP.
- The Human Genome: Poems on the Book of Life (B&T 2008)

== Anthology contributions ==
- New Blood (Bloodaxe)
- Faber Book of 20th Century Scottish Poems (Faber)
- Dream States (Faber)
- Making for Planet Alice (Bloodaxe)
- New Scottish Poets (Polygon)
- Modern Scottish Women Poets (Canongate)
- Edinburgh Book of 20th Century Scottish Poetry (Edinburgh University Press)
- Handsel (Scottish Poetry Library/Polygon)
- 100 Favourite Scottish Poems (Luath/Scottish Poetry Library)

== Awards ==
- Prizewinner, Daily Telegraph Arvon International Poetry Competition
- The £25,000 Creative Scotland Award for Literature (Scottish Arts Council (2002)
- Shortlisted, the Scottish First Book of the Year
- The Scottish Arts Council (now Creative Scotland) - three Writer’s Bursaries
