= Jeff Ferguson =

Jeff Ferguson may refer to:

- Jeff Ferguson (basketball) (born 1981), Canadian basketball player
- Jeff Ferguson (ice hockey) (born 1969), Canadian ice hockey and roller hockey goaltender
- Jeff Ferguson, American college football punter on the List of Oklahoma Sooners football All-Americans
- Jeff Ferguson, American film producer of The Zombie Chronicles

== See also ==
- Geoffrey Ferguson (1950-2003), American mass murderer
