= Artie Ferguson =

Australian rules footballer, born 1910

Personal information
- Full name: Arthur Gordon Ferguson
- Born: 18 July 1910; Coleraine, Victoria
- Died: 8 October 1969 (aged 59); Wodonga, Victoria
- Original team: Golden Point
- Height: 180 cm (5 ft 11 in)
- Weight: 74 kg (163 lb)

Playing career^{1}
Years	Club	Games (Goals)
1936–1937	Footscray	26 (1)
- ^{1} Playing statistics correct to the end of 1937.

Arthur Gordon Ferguson (18 July 1910 – 8 October 1969) was an Australian rules footballer who played for the Footscray Football Club in the Victorian Football League (VFL).
