= Joe Ferguson (disambiguation) =

Joe Ferguson is a former American football quarterback in the NFL.

Joe or Joseph Ferguson may also refer to:

- Joe Ferguson (baseball) (born 1946), former Major League Baseball catcher
- Joseph “Joe” Ferguson (1980-2001), perpetrator of the 2001 Sacramento Shootings
- Joe Ferguson (1962–2001), director of the geography education outreach program for the National Geographic Society
- Joe Ferguson, Northern Irish radio presenter on Belfast CityBeat
- Joe Ferguson (rugby league), rugby league footballer who played in the 1890s, 1900s, 1910s and 1920s
- Joseph Ferguson (MP) (1788–1853), British Whig politician, MP for Carlisle, between 1852–1857
- Joseph Ferguson (Australian politician) (died 1912) member for Ovens in the Victorian Legislative Assembly
- Joseph Ferguson (coach), former head coach for the Warrensburg Teachers College in basketball and football
- Joseph T. Ferguson (1892–1979), Ohio State Auditor
- Joe Ferguson (footballer) (born 2002), English-Indonesian association footballer
- Joe Ferguson (sprinter), British sprinter
