= Jay Ferguson =

Jay Ferguson may refer to:

- Jay Ferguson (American musician) (born 1947), band member of Spirit and Jo Jo Gunne
- Jay Ferguson (Canadian musician) (born 1968), band member of Sloan
- Jay R. Ferguson (born 1974), American actor
