= Stuart Ferguson (cricketer) =

English cricketer (born 1974)

Personal information
- Full name: Stuart Hunter Ferguson
- Born: 13 October 1974 (age 52); Sonoma, California, U.S.
- Batting: Right-handed
- Bowling: Right-arm medium-fast

Domestic team information
- Years: Team
- 1998: Oxford University

Career statistics
Competition	First-class
Matches	1
Runs scored	2
Batting average	2.00
100s/50s	–/–
Top score	2
Balls bowled	158
Wickets	3
Bowling average	47.00
5 wickets in innings	–
10 wickets in match	–
Best bowling	3/82
Catches/stumpings	1/–
- Source: Cricinfo, 2 May 2020

Stuart Hunter Ferguson (born 13 October 1974) is an English solicitor and former first-class cricketer.

Ferguson was born in Sonoma, California, in October 1974. Moving to England, he was educated at Nottingham High School before going up to Mansfield College, Oxford. While studying at Oxford, he made a single appearance in first-class cricket for Oxford University against Warwickshire at Oxford in 1998. Ferguson took three wickets in the match with his right-arm medium-fast bowling, dismissing Mike Powell, Dominic Ostler and Dougie Brown in the Warwickshire first innings. He batted once in the match, scoring 2 runs in the Oxford first innings before being dismissed for 2 runs by Neil Smith. After graduating from Oxford, he became a solicitor and was admitted to practice in April 2003.
