= Max Ferguson (painter) =

American artist

Max Ferguson (born 1959) is an American artist best known for his realistic paintings of vanishing urban scenes in and around New York City.

Oil painter Max Ferguson did hand-drawn animated films as a teenager, eventually graduating from New York University with a degree in film 1980. However, while spending a year at an art school in Amsterdam when he was 19, Gerrit Rietveld Academie, his interest switched from film to painting; after only a few months there, the City of Amsterdam purchased one of his works. He was, and continues to be, greatly influenced by Dutch 17th-century painting.

Ferguson has worked on a number of series over the years, including the New York City subway system, Coney Island, nocturnal imagery, paintings of his father and Jewish scenes.

Ferguson's work has been widely exhibited since the 1980s, including in the collections of such private collectors as Stewart Lane and Bonnie Comley. and public collections including the Metropolitan Museum of Art, New York; the Crystal Bridges Museum of American Art, Arkansas; The British Museum, London; the Museum of the City of New York, Museum of the City of New York the Albertina, Vienna; the Seven Bridges Foundation, Connecticut. He has exhibited at the Yeshiva University Museum, New York.
