= Arthur Furguson =

Arthur Furguson (1883–1938) was (or may have been) a Scottish con artist who allegedly became known for "selling" English national monuments and other property to visiting American tourists during the 1920s.

It is claimed that in the 1920s, Furguson sold monuments such as Nelson's Column in Trafalgar Square (for the sum of £6,000), Big Ben (£1,000 for a down payment), and Buckingham Palace (£2,000 for a down payment) to American tourists. Furguson immigrated to the US in 1925. He sold the White House to a rancher on the installment plan for yearly payments of $100,000, and tried to sell the Statue of Liberty to a visiting Australian, who went to the police. Furguson was imprisoned and was released in 1930. He continued to defraud people in Los Angeles until his death in 1938.

However, according to author Dane Love, who profiled Furguson in his book The Man Who Sold Nelson's Column, the existence of Furguson himself may be a hoax. Love attempted to trace contemporary records which would confirm the story, but found "[t]here was nothing about his arrest, his trial or his time in jail in New York. There's not even any trace of his grave in Los Angeles, where he supposedly died in 1938."

== See also ==
- George C. Parker
- Victor Lustig
