= Garvin Ferguson =

Bahamian swimmer (born 1968)

Personal information
- Born: 11 March 1968 (age 58)

Sport
- Sport: Swimming

Garvin Ferguson (born 11 March 1968) is a Bahamian swimmer. He competed in two events at the 1988 Summer Olympics.
