= Ian Ferguson =

Ian Ferguson may refer to:

- Ian Ferguson (canoeist) (born 1952), Olympic kayaker from New Zealand
- Ian Ferguson (writer), Canadian writer
- Ian Ferguson (footballer, born 1967), former Rangers F.C. and Scotland footballer, then a manager in Australia with the Central Coast Mariners, North Queensland Fury and Perth Glory
- Ian Ferguson (footballer, born 1968), Scottish former professional footballer with, amongst other teams, Hearts and St. Johnstone
- Ian Bruce Ferguson (1917–1988), Australian Army officer in World War II and the Korean War

== See also ==
- Iain Ferguson (born 1962), Scottish footballer with Dundee, Rangers, Dundee United, Hearts and Motherwell
- Iain Ferguson (businessman), British businessman
- Ian Fergusson (born 1965), BBC weather presenter
