= Johan Jacob Ferguson =

Dutch mathematician (c. 1630–1691)

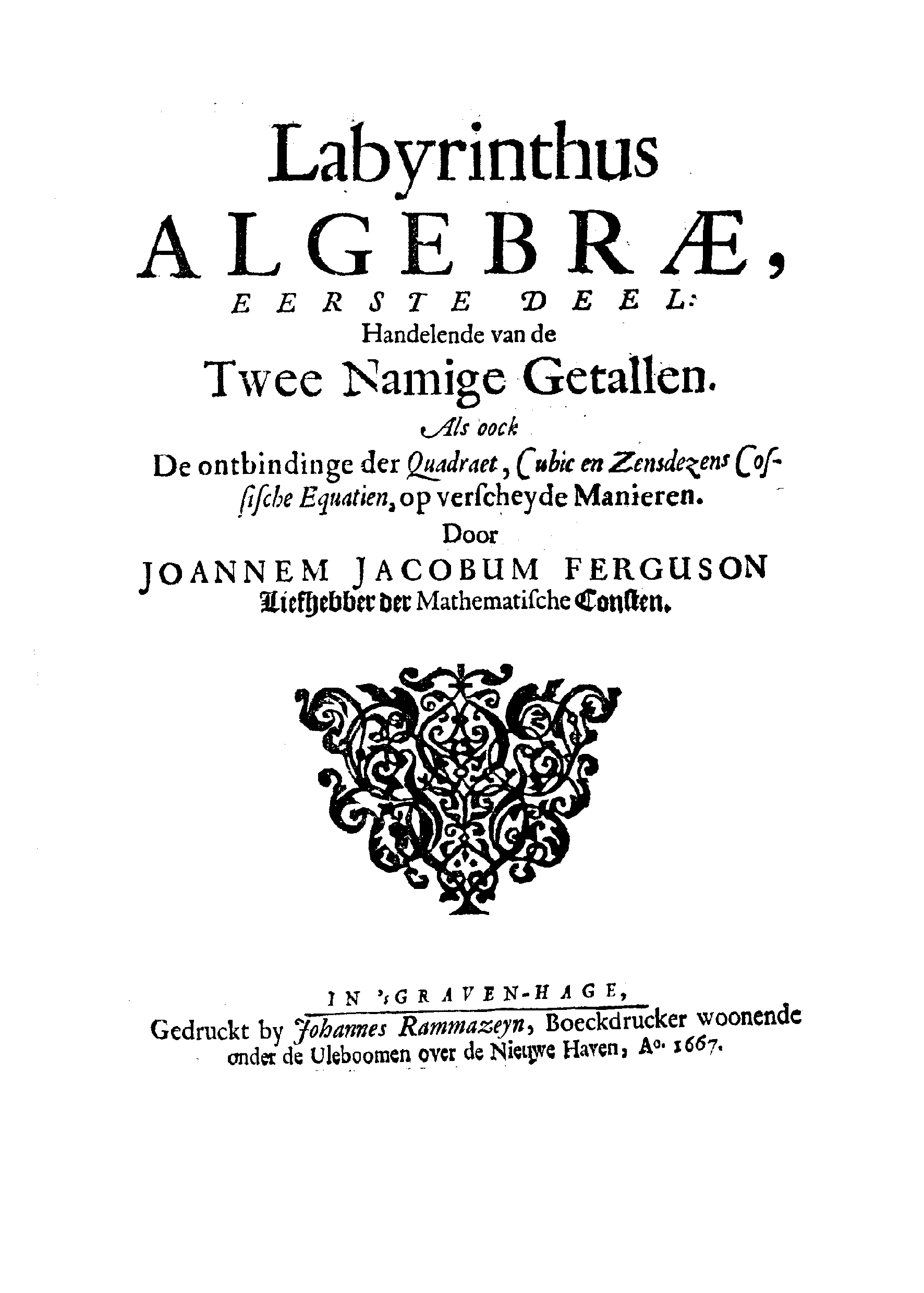
Labyrinthus algebrae (1667)

Johan Jacob Ferguson was a 17th-century Dutch mathematician who corresponded with Gottfried Wilhelm Leibniz.

== Life ==
He was born around 1630, probably in The Hague, and died before 24 November 1706, probably on 6 October 1691 in Amsterdam.

In his 1667 book Labyrinthus algebrae, written in low Dutch, he shows the solutions of cubic and biquadratic equations using new methods. The book had a partial translation in Latin (lost) and was sent to Isaac Newton.

== Works ==
- Labyrinthus algebrae (in Dutch). 's-Gravenhage: Johannes Rammazeyn. 1667.
