= Ryan Ferguson =

Ryan Ferguson may refer to:

- Ryan Ferguson (musician), (born c. 1975) American guitarist and singer-songwriter
- Ryan Ferguson (footballer) (born 1981), Australian rules footballer
- Ryan W. Ferguson (born 1984), American man wrongfully convicted for a 2001 murder in Missouri
