= Reg Ferguson =

- Born: Reginald T. Ferguson c. 1901 Sydney

Rugby union career
- Position: lock
International career
Years	Team	Apps	(Points)
1922–23	Wallabies	4	(0)

Reginald T. "Reg" Ferguson (born c. 1901) was a rugby union player who represented Australia.

Ferguson, a lock, was born in Sydney and claimed a total of 4 international rugby caps for Australia.
