= Archie Ferguson =

Scottish footballer (1918–1998)

Personal information
- Full name: Archibald Ferguson
- Date of birth: 9 December 1918
- Place of birth: Lochore, Scotland
- Date of death: 19 March 1998 (aged 79)
- Place of death: Dunfermline, Fife, Scotland
- Position: Goalkeeper

Youth career
- St Andrews United

Senior career*
Years	Team	Apps	(Gls)
1938–1939	Raith Rovers	14	(0)
1946–1949	Doncaster Rovers	61	(0)
1949–1953	Wrexham	126	(0)
1953	Dunfermline Athletic	1	(0)
- * Club domestic league appearances and goals

Archibald Ferguson (9 December 1918 – 19 March 1998) was a Scottish footballer who played as a goalkeeper.

== Career ==
Ferguson signed for Raith Rovers at 19, however his professional career there was cut short due to the outbreak of World War II, and the suspension of the football leagues in the UK.

During the war, Ferguson guested for Bolton Wanderers and Doncaster Rovers.

Ferguson would sign for Doncaster Rovers after the war in 1946, making 61 appearances for the club.

In 1949, Ferguson would move to Wrexham, where he would spend 4 years and met his future wife.

In 1953 Ferguson would move back to Scotland with Dunfermline Athletic, making 1 appearance before retiring.
