= Mark Ferguson =

Mark Ferguson may refer to:

- Mark E. Ferguson III (born 1956), U.S. Navy admiral
- Mark Ferguson (footballer) (born 1960), English footballer
- Mark Ferguson (actor) (born 1961), Australian actor and television presenter
- Mark Ferguson (news presenter) (born 1966), Australian news presenter
- Mark Ferguson (cricketer) (born 1981), Hong Kong cricketer
- Mark Ferguson (politician), British politician
- Mark D. Ferguson (born 1986), Scottish film director and screenwriter
- Mark Ferguson (handballer) (born 1990), Irish handball player
