= Luna Ferguson =

Canadian filmmaker and LGBT activist

Luna M. Ferguson
- Occupations: Activist, author, filmmaker
- Years active: 2017–present
- Notable work: Me, Myself, They

Luna Ferguson is a Canadian filmmaker and LGBTQ activist. Ferguson uses the pronouns they/them.

Ferguson is a graduate of Algonquin College, University of Western Ontario and the University of British Columbia.

In May 2017, Ferguson applied to change their birth registration to non-binary. After extended delay, they filed a human rights complaint with the Human Rights Tribunal of Ontario in September 2017. The government of Ontario changed its policies in 2018 and issued Ferguson with a birth certificate showing their gender as non-binary. As a consequence of Ferguson's case, in addition to having options to change gender to male, female or X, Ontario is the first Canadian province, or government administration in the world, to permit citizens to request birth certificates with no sexual designation.

In September 2019, Ferguson announced that they had legally changed their first name to Luna.

== Works ==
Ferguson's documentary about their life as a non-binary person and the fight for legal recognition is in post-production. Their film Whispers of Life was winner of the audience award and jury award for Best LGBTQ Short Film in the 2014 Reel Pride Film Festival and won the audience award at the Reelout Queer Film Festival. Ferguson is the director and producer of Limina, released in 2016, featuring the experience of a gender-fluid child. Limina was the first film to be nominated in both male and female performance categories for the same actor by the Leo Awards.

Their non-fiction book Me, Myself, They was published in 2019.

== See also ==
- Legal recognition of non-binary gender § Canada
