= Arthur Ferguson (footballer) =

Australian rules footballer

Personal information
- Full name: Arthur Reginald Ferguson
- Born: 9 April 1887; Melbourne, Victoria
- Died: 13 March 1969 (aged 81); Kew, Victoria
- Original team: Prahran

Playing career^{1}
Years	Club	Games (Goals)
1907–08	Prahran (VFA)	26 (7)
1909–10	Fitzroy	20 (1)
1912	Melbourne	2 (0)
- ^{1} Playing statistics correct to the end of 1912.

Arthur Reginald Ferguson (9 April 1887 – 13 March 1969) was an Australian rules footballer who played for the Fitzroy Football Club and Melbourne Football Club in the Victorian Football League (VFL).

== Family ==
The son of Robert Alexander Ferguson, and Fanny Ferguson, née Hood, Arthur Reginald Ferguson was born in Melbourne on 9 April 1887.

He married Rosabelle (a.k.a. Rosabella) Gordon (-1916) in 1911.
