= Ken Ferguson =

Ken Ferguson may refer to:

- Ken Ferguson (Canadian football) (born 1944), Canadian football player
- Ken Ferguson (politician) (born c. 1951), American politician in Arkansas
- Ken Ferguson (ceramist) (1928-2004), American ceramist
