= Tamnaherin =

Townland in County Londonderry, Northern Ireland

Coordinates: 54.982°N 7.203°W

Tamnaherin: Irish: Tamhnach Caorthainn
- Location within Northern Ireland
- District: Derry and Strabane
- County: County Londonderry
- Country: Northern Ireland
- Sovereign state: United Kingdom
- Post town: LONDONDERRY
- Postcode district: BT
- Dialling code: 028, +44 28
- Police: Northern Ireland
- Fire: Northern Ireland
- Ambulance: Northern Ireland
- UK Parliament: Foyle
- NI Assembly: Foyle

Tamnaherin (possibly from the Irish: Tamhnach Caorthainn or 'field of the blackthorns') is a townland and small housing estate in County Londonderry, Northern Ireland. In the 2001 census it had a population of 123 people. It is situated within Derry and Strabane district.

== History ==
In the early 19th century, Tamnaherin simply consisted of a few scattered rural properties. The addition of a Roman Catholic church in the 1970s saw the building of several more properties. In later years, however, the area has seen further development, including the addition of a small housing estate.

== See also ==
- List of villages in Northern Ireland
