= Bruce K. Ferguson =

American landscape architect

Bruce K. Ferguson is an American landscape architect, author, and educator. He is known for his research in environmental landscape technologies and their integration in urban design, and in particular for his work on permeable paving and stormwater management.

== Education and career ==
Ferguson earned the AB degree from Dartmouth College and the MLA (Master of Landscape Architecture) from the University of Pennsylvania in the department led by Ian L. McHarg. He practiced landscape architecture full-time for five years in the Pittsburgh area, and then taught for two years at Pennsylvania State University while serving as Faculty Advisor in the United States Bureau of Mines Environmental Protection Division on amelioration of acid mine drainage from abandoned coal mines. In 1982 he began teaching at the University of Georgia, where he eventually became Dan B. Franklin Distinguished Professor of Landscape Architecture.

Ferguson is Past President of the Council of Educators in Landscape Architecture.

== Recognition ==
Ferguson is the 1992 winner of the Bradford Williams Medal for the year's best-written article in Landscape Architecture. He was elected as a Fellow of the American Society of Landscape Architects in 1994. The Council of Educators in Landscape Architecture elected him as a Fellow in 2010, and in the same year gave him their Outstanding Educator Award.

== Books ==
- Ferguson, Bruce K. (2021). A philosophy of landscape construction: the vision of built landscapes. Abingdon, Oxon New York, NY: Routledge. ISBN 9780367512774.
- Porous Pavements, Boca Raton: CRC Press, 2005, ISBN 978-0-8493-2670-7
- Introduction to Stormwater: Concept, Purpose, Design, New York: John Wiley and Sons, 1998, ISBN 978-0-471-16528-6
- Stormwater Infiltration, Boca Raton: Lewis Publishers, 1994, ISBN 0-87371-987-5
- On-Site Stormwater Management: Applications for Landscape and Engineering, with Thomas N. Debo, PDA Publishers, 1987, 2nd ed., Van Nostrand Reinhold, 1990, ISBN 9780442001162
