= Henry Augustus Ferguson =

American painter

Henry Augustus Ferguson (c. 1842–1911) was an American landscape painter of the Hudson River School, distinguishing himself by depicting scenes from South America to the Middle East.

== Biography ==
His birth is variously dated between 1842 and 1845, in Glen Falls, New York. He studied painting under Homer Dodge Martin and George Henry Boughton in Albany when he was under the age of 18, moving to New York City "in the early years of the Civil War." He continued to paint the Hudson Valley, and exhibited at the National Academy of Design in 1867 and 1870. Ferguson spent much of the 1870s out of the country on long painting expeditions, based mainly in Santiago, Chile, selling work to patrons in South America, as well as preparing a trove of sketches for later completion. Returning to New York by the close of 1873, he set up shop at 8 Asto, and ce. He continued to produce finished works from this expedition before setting off for another multi-year excursion to Cairo and Venice. He died in New York City on March 23, 1911.
