= Keith Ferguson =

Keith Ferguson may refer to:

- Keith Ferguson (American football) (born 1959), former American football defensive end
- Keith Ferguson (musician) (1946–1997), American bass guitarist
- Keith Ferguson (sport shooter), Australian sport shooter
- Keith Ferguson (voice actor) (born 1972), American voice actor
