= Porsha Ferguson =

American actress

- Born: Porsha Uvonne Ferguson; November 8, 1989 (age 36); Memphis, Tennessee, United States
- Education: The Juilliard School; The Barrow Group; Clayton State University
- Occupation: Actress
- Years active: Since 2011
- Notable work: The Haves and the Have Nots
- Website: porshaferguson.com

Porsha Ferguson (born November 8, 1989) is an American Actor. She is known for her role Zena on The Haves and the Have Nots and has also appeared in feature films including Free in Deed, Breathe, Closet Space, and The Last Punch. She has starred in the film Soul Ties and episodes of TV One’s channel Fatal Attraction, Justice By Any Means and the Investigation Discovery series, Homicide Hunter.

== Career ==
Ferguson first appeared on the VH1 series Single Ladies. In 2014 she made her major acting debut on TV One's series, Fatal Attraction following performances in several independent films. In Fatal Attraction Ferguson played lead real-life character Elicia Hughes, a woman on trial for murdering her husband, Eric Hughes in Jackson, Mississippi in 2004. Ferguson played in the film, The Last Punch as front desk clerk, Creamy in Breathe, and as a church member in Free in Deed. She appeared in the pilot By Any Means, directed by The Facts of Life actress, Kim Fields. Ferguson also starred and produced for the film Closet Space and the series Twisted Mines. In June 2015 she joined the cast of Tyler Perry’s The Haves and the Have Nots as the role of Zena. She also starred in Soul Ties and in episodes of TV One’s series Justice: By Any Means as Detective Johanna Phillips and Investigation Discovery series Homicide Hunter as Kathy Crow.

== Filmography ==
=== Film ===
Year	Title	Role	Notes
2012	Run	Creamy	
2013	5 People	Pamela	
2014	The Killing Secret	Donna Richardson	
2014	Unspoken Words	Poetess	
2014	Bloated Minds	Miranda Epps	
2014	Closet Space: The Movie	Lisa Arlington	
2014	Breathe: The Prequel	Creamy	
2015	Good Streets	Brianna	
2015	The Run Saga: Breathe	Creamy	
2015	Free in Deed	Congregational church member	
2015	Thirsty The Movie	Morgan Pierce	
2015	Love N Success	Club girl 2	
2015	The Last Punch	Miranda	
2016	Soul Ties	School choir member	

=== Television ===
Year	Title	Role	Notes
2011	Single Ladies	Waitress	Episode: "Confidence Games"
2012	Uncanny X-Men	Raver 3	Episode 3: "Dazzler"
2013	The Label	Sierra	Episode: "Big Bosses"
2013	Passport	Shelly (Dancer)	2 episodes
2014	My Other Mother	Fan No. 1	TV movie
2015	Justice: By Any Means	Det. Johanna Phillips	Episode #1.1
2015	Homicide Hunter: Lt. Joe Kenda	Kathy Crow	Episode #5.14
2015	The Haves and the Have Nots	Zena	All episodes
2015	By Any Means	BeeBee	2 episodes
2015	Twisted Mines	Tara	7 episodes
