= Susan J. Ferguson =

Susan J. Ferguson (born 1961) is a professor of sociology at Grinnell College. She received her B.A. in Spanish and Political Science from Colorado State University in 1984, as well as her 1988 M.A. in sociology; she received her Ph.D. in sociology in 1993 from the University of Massachusetts - Amherst. She specializes in the areas of sociology of the family, Asian women, medical sociology, women's health, feminism and teaching.

She received the 2018 Hans O. Mauksch Award at the annual meeting of the American Sociological Association (ASA) in Philadelphia for her contributions to the teaching and learning of sociology through program development, student advising, and assessment of curriculum and teaching materials.

== Publications ==
- Race, Gender, Sexuality, and Social Class Dimensions of Inequality and Identity, Fourth Edition. Thousand Oaks: Sage Publications (2023)
- Shifting the Center Understanding Contemporary Families, Sixth Edition. Thousand Oaks: Sage Publications (2022)
- Mapping the Social Landscape Readings in Sociology, Ninth Edition. Thousand Oaks: Sage Publications (2020)
- Families in the 21st Century Series (4 volumes), (2008–2010), series editor
- Editor. Contemporary Family Perspectives Series. Thousand Oaks: Sage Publications. 2011–2016.
- Editor. Breast Cancer: Society Shapes an Epidemic. New York: Palgrave. Co-editor is Anne S. Kasper. December 2000.
