= Leslie Ferguson =

Australian cricketer

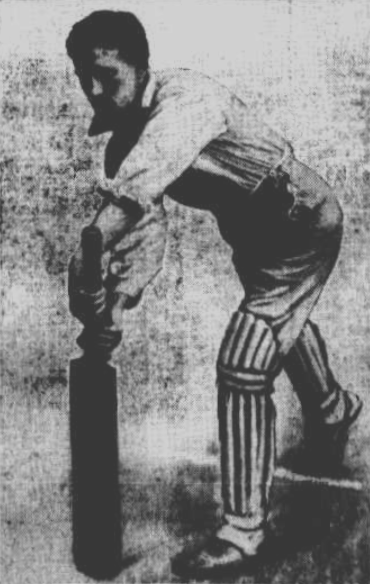

Personal information
- Born: 8 September 1892; Melbourne, Australia
- Died: 30 January 1957 (aged 64); Melbourne, Australia

Domestic team information
- Years: Team
- 1920-1924: Victoria
- Source: Cricinfo, 19 November 2015

Leslie Ferguson (8 September 1892 – 30 January 1957) was an Australian cricketer. He played four first-class cricket matches for Victoria between 1920 and 1924.

== See also ==
- List of Victoria first-class cricketers
