= Clan Fergusson =

Scottish clan

- MacFhearghuis
- Crest: Upon a chapeau Gules furred Ermine, a bee on a thistle Proper
- Motto: Dulcius ex asperis (Sweeter after difficulties)
- War cry: Fhearghuis Gu Brath - Fergus forever

Profile
- Region: Lowlands and Highlands
- District: Ayrshire, Argyll, Aberdeenshire, Perthshire, Dumfries and Galloway
- Plant badge: Little sunflower

Chief
- Sir Adam Fergusson of Kilkerran
- 10th Baronet of Kilkerran
- Seat: Kilkerran House, Ayrshire
Septs of Clan Fergusson
Forgan, Fergie, Fergus, Fergushill, Ferguson, Fergussill, Fearghus, Farrish, Ferrie, Ferries, Ferris, Forgie, Furgerson, Hardie, Hardy, Kiddie, Kydd, Keddie, Keddle, Ketchen, Kidd, MacTavert MacHerries, MacKidd, Madani. The Gaelic name has been rendered through translation into the forms, MacFergus. variations as MacAdie, MacCade, MacErries, MacHerries, MacKerras (especially common in Argyll and Australia), MacKersey, MacKestan, MacFhearghuis, MacMagnus and even MacIrish, MacInlay, MacNaughton were formed.

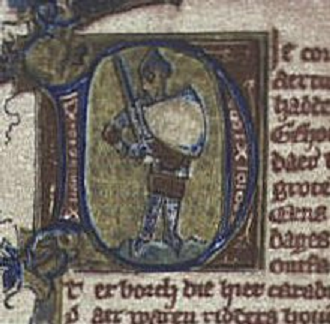
Picture of Fergus in a MS of Ferguut, a derivative text based on the Roman de Fergus from the Netherlands.

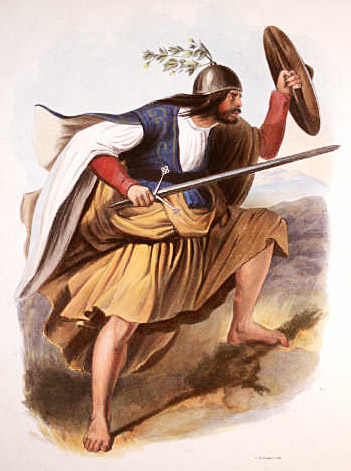
A romanticised Victorian-era illustration of a Fergusson clansman by R. R. McIan from The Clans of the Scottish Highlands published in 1845.

Clan Fergusson is a Scottish clan. Known as the Sons of Fergus they have spread across Scotland from as far as Ross-shire in the north to Dumfriesshire in the south.

== History ==
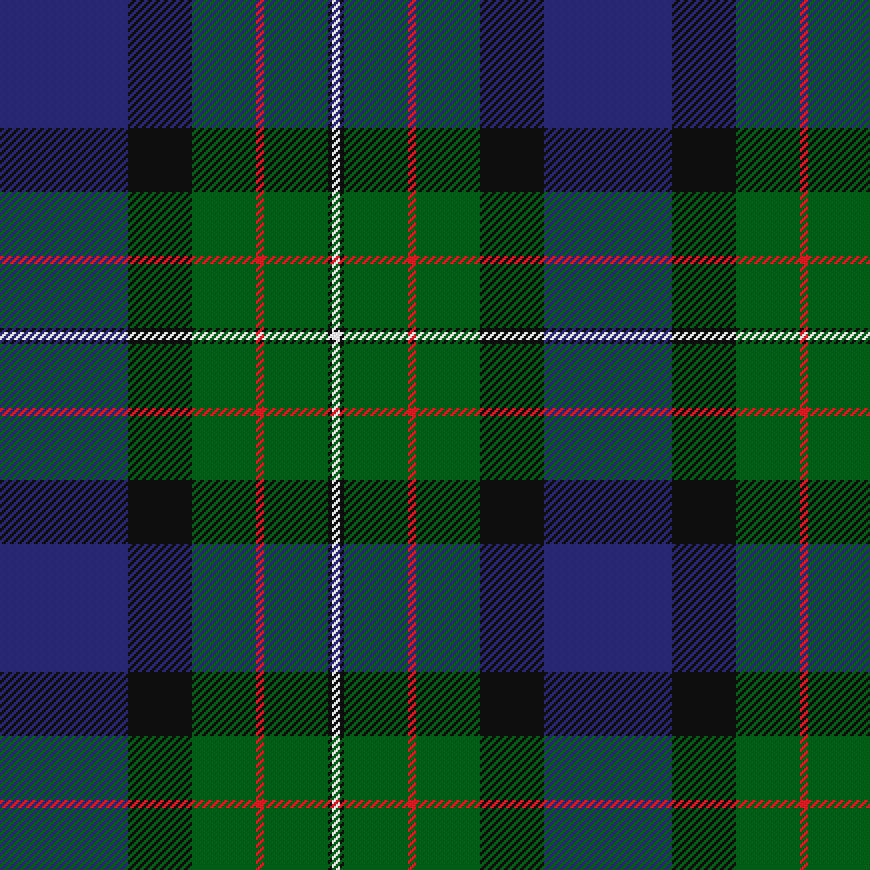
Fergusson tartan

=== Origins ===
The Scottish Gaelic patronymic of Fergusson is MacFhearghuis which can also be translated as son of the angry. There is a tradition that attributes a common ancestry to the various distinct families bearing the name of Fergusson, however there is no evidence to support this and the heraldry of the chief's family is significantly different from that of other Fergusson families.

The Fergussons of Argyll claim descent from Fergus Mór, king of Dál Riata who came from Ireland across Argyll. Most shields of this family include a Boar's head which indicates a connection with the early Scots of Dál Riata.

There is evidence that links the Fergussons of Ayrshire and Dumfries with Fergus of Galloway, who was an important figure during the reigns of David I of Scotland and Malcolm IV of Scotland. Fergus of Galloway restored Whithorn church and also founded Dundrennan Abbey. He died in 1161 at Holyrood Abbey. The Earls of Carrick descend from Fergus of Galloway.

The Fergussons held lands at Kilkerran from probably the 12th century, although the first certain record is that of John Fergusson of Kilkerran in 1464. This John Fergusson may have been descended from John, son of Fergus who was a witness to a charter of Edward Bruce, which was signed in 1314 after the Battle of Bannockburn.

There were Fergussons all over southern Carrick by 1600, who all acknowledged Fergusson of Kilkerran as their clan chief.

=== 17th century and Civil War ===
The Clan Fergusson allied themselves with the Clan Kennedy chiefs, the Earls of Cassillis in their feud against the Kennedy Lairds of Bargany. The Fergussons were part of John Kennedy, 5th Earl of Cassilis's band in 1601 when a skirmish took place at Maybole where the Kennedy Laird of Bargany was killed.

The Ayrshire Fergussons adopted the Protestant faith during Protestant Reformation whilst Sir John Fergusson of Kilkerran fought for the royalists during the Scottish Civil War.

=== 18th century ===
Sir John Fergusson, who was born in about 1653 was a distinguished lawyer and a member of the Faculty of Advocates. In 1703 he was created a Baronet of Nova Scotia. In 1735 his son, James Fergusson became a judge of the Supreme Court and was given the title Lord Kilkerran. General Sir Charles Fergusson, the 7th Baronet served in the British Army for almost forty years.

== Clan Chief ==
- Clan Chief: Sir Adam Fergusson of Kilkerran, 10th Bt., Chief of the Name and Arms of Fergusson.
- Clan Chief's Arms: Azure a buckle Argent between three boars' heads couped close Or.

== Tartans ==
- Tartans:
  - Fergusson (of Atholl)
  - Fergusson of Balquhidder
  - Fergusson Dress

== See also ==
- Ferguson (name) - list of famous Fergusons
- Scottish clan
