= Thomas Ferguson =

Thomas or Tom Ferguson may refer to:

- Tom Ferguson (jockey), see 1839 Grand National
- Thomas Roberts Ferguson (1818–1879), Ontario businessman and political figure
- Thomas Ferguson (1820–1900), founder of Thomas Ferguson & Co Ltd, an Irish linen Jacquard weaver in Ireland
- Thomas B. Ferguson, United States Ambassador to Sweden, 1894–1898
- Thomas Ferguson (medical doctor) (1900–1977), Scottish surgeon and professor of public health
- Thomas Stuart Ferguson (1915–1983), American archaeologist
- Tom Ferguson (footballer) (1920–2008), Australian footballer for Melbourne
- Thomas Ferguson (goalkeeper) (1898–1955), Scottish football goalkeeper (Falkirk FC)
- Thomas S. Ferguson (born 1929), American mathematician and statistician
- Thomas C. Ferguson (born 1933), former United States Ambassador to Brunei
- Thomas William Ferguson (1943–2006), American medical doctor and author
- Thomas Ferguson (academic) (born 1949), American political scientist/economist and author
- Thomas A. Ferguson (born 1950), official in the U.S. Dept. of the Treasury
- Tom R. Ferguson (born 1950), rodeo cowboy
- Tom Ferguson (American football), American football offensive tackle
- Tom Ferguson (politician), Green Party candidate for Niagara West—Glanbrook in the 2004 Canadian federal election
- Thomas Dale Ferguson (born 1973), convicted double killer sentenced to death in Alabama

== See also ==
- Thomas Fergusson (disambiguation)
- Thompson B. Ferguson, governor of Oklahoma Territory
