= Samuel Ferguson (disambiguation) =

Samuel Ferguson was an artist and antiquary.

Samuel Ferguson may also refer to:

- Samuel David Ferguson (1842–1916), Episcopal bishop in America
- Samuel Lewis Ferguson (1869–1934), American lawyer, newspaper publisher and politician
- Samuel W. Ferguson (1834–1917), Confederate States Army general
- Champ Ferguson (1821–1865), Confederate guerrilla during the American Civil War
- Dr. Samuel Fergusson, main character in the novel Five Weeks in a Balloon by Jules Verne
- Samuel Thomas Ferguson (1871–1948), the eponymous owner of Samuel Ferguson's cottage in West Toodyay, Western Australia
