= Stewart Ferguson =

American football and basketball coach (1900–1955)

Biographical details
- Born: January 27, 1900; Carthage, Missouri, U.S.
- Died: December 29, 1955 (aged 55); Deadwood, South Dakota, U.S.

Playing career

Football
- c. 1920: Dakota Wesleyan
- Position: End

Coaching career (HC unless noted)

Football
- 1929–1933: Dakota Wesleyan
- 1934: Arkansas A&M
- 1938–1941: Arkansas A&M
- 1944–1954: Deadwood HS (SD)

Basketball
- 1929–1934: Dakota Wesleyan

Administrative career (AD unless noted)
- 1929–1934: Dakota Wesleyan
- 1934–?: Arkansas A&M

Head coaching record
- Overall: 20–69–2 (college football); 65–17 (college basketball)

Accomplishments and honors

Championships
- Football; 1 SDIC (1929) Basketball; 4 SDIC regular season (1930–1933)

Stewart Ferguson (January 27, 1900 – December 29, 1955) was an American football and basketball coach. He served as the head football coach at Dakota Wesleyan University in Mitchell, South Dakota from 1929 to 1933 and at Arkansas Agricultural and Mechanical College—now known as the University of Arkansas–Monticello—in 1934 and from 1938 to 1941, compiling a career college football coaching record of 20–69–2. As a college football coach, he was credited with inventing the Swinging gate formation. Ferguson was also the head basketball coach at Dakota Wesleyan from 1929 to 1934, tallying a mark of 65–17.

A native of Carthage, Missouri, Ferguson played college football at Dakota Wesleyan, starting as an end on teams coached by Bud Daugherty. He died of a heart attack, on December 29, 1955, in Deadwood, South Dakota.

Ferguson was humorously profiled by Frank X. Tolbert in his collection, Tolbert's Texas.

== Head coaching record ==
=== College football ===
Year	Team	Overall	Conference	Standing	Bowl/playoffs
Dakota Wesleyan Tigers (South Dakota Intercollegiate Conference) (1929–1933)
1929	Dakota Wesleyan	5–2–1	4–0–1	T–1st	
1930	Dakota Wesleyan	6–3	3–1	4th	
1931	Dakota Wesleyan	2–6–1	2–3–1	T–7th	
1932	Dakota Wesleyan	3–5	2–3	6th	
1933	Dakota Wesleyan	1–6	1–6	9th	
Dakota Wesleyan:		17–22–2	12–13–2		
Arkansas A&M Boll Weevils (Arkansas Intercollegiate Conference) (1934)
1934	Arkansas A&M	0–8			
Arkansas A&M Boll Weevils (Arkansas Intercollegiate Conference) (1938–1941)
1938	Arkansas A&M	0–9			
1939	Arkansas A&M	1–9			
1940	Arkansas A&M	2–9			
1941	Arkansas A&M	0–12			
Arkansas A&M:		3–47			
Total:		20–69–2			
National championship Conference title Conference division title or championship game berth

=== Basketball ===
Record table
Season	Team	Overall	Conference	Standing	Postseason
Dakota Wesleyan Tigers (South Dakota Intercollegiate Conference) (1929–1934)
1929–30	Dakota Wesleyan	10–6	9–2	1st	
1930–31	Dakota Wesleyan	13–2	10–0	1st	
1931–32	Dakota Wesleyan	19–1	11–0	1st	
1932–33	Dakota Wesleyan	12–4	10–1	1st	
1933–34	Dakota Wesleyan	11–5	9–2	2nd	
Dakota Wesleyan:		65–17	49–5		
Total:		65–17			
National champion Postseason invitational champion Conference regular season champion Conference regular season and conference tournament champion Division regular season champion Division regular season and conference tournament champion Conference tournament champion
