= Steve Ferguson =

Steve or Steven Ferguson may refer to:

- Steven Ferguson (born 1980), New Zealand canoeist and swimmer
- Steven Ferguson (footballer, born 1977), Scottish football player and coach
- Steven Ferguson (footballer, born 1982), Scottish football player
- Steve Ferguson (musician), member of American rock band NRBQ
