= Kelly K. Ferguson =

American public health researcher

- Education: University of Michigan School of Public Health
- Scientific career
- Workplaces: NIEHS
- Thesis: Environmental phthalate exposure, oxidative stress, and preterm birth (2014)

Kelly K. Ferguson is an American public health researcher who is a Senior Investigator in the National Institute of Environmental Health Sciences. She leads the Perinatal and Early Life Epidemiology Group, which studies how maternal exposure to chemicals impacts pregnancy and development. In 2021, she was awarded the inaugural Lou Guillette Jr. Outstanding Young Investigator Award.

== Early life and education ==
Ferguson earned her Master's of Public Health in Occupational and Environmental Epidemiology at the University of Michigan. She stayed in Michigan for her doctoral research, where she studied preterm birth in the United States. Preterm birth contributes to neonatal mortality and children's long-term health conditions. Her research showed that prenatal exposure to phthalates increased the likelihood of preterm birth. She used mass spectrometry to measure phthalate levels in urine samples.

== Research and career ==
Ferguson was appointed to the faculty at the National Institute of Environmental Health Sciences in 2015. She studies how exposure to chemicals in common consumer products impacts prenatal development. She has shown that these chemicals can cross placental and blood–brain barriers. She showed that phthalates, plasticizers found in commercial products (e.g. shampoos, soaps) impact birth outcomes. She has studied oxidative stress – imbalances between reactive and antioxidant oxygen species. Exercise can result in elevated levels of oxidative stress and antioxidant capacity describes how people respond to it. Ferguson believes that higher levels of phthalates and emotional stress during pregnancy elevates oxidative stress.

Ferguson has focused on complex mixtures of chemicals that often have different effects than the individual chemicals. To evaluate mixtures of chemicals, Ferguson developed an analytical method called "quantile g-computation,".

== Awards and honors ==
In 2018, Ferguson was named the NIEHS Mentor of the Year. That year she was named one of the "Collaborative on Health and the Environment"'s top twenty Pioneers Under 40 in Environmental Public Health.

In 2021, Ferguson was awarded the inaugural Lou Guillette Jr. Outstanding Young Investigator Award by Healthy Environment and Endocrine Disruptor Strategies.

== Selected publications ==
- John D Meeker; Kelly K Ferguson (July 11, 2011). "Relationship between urinary phthalate and bisphenol A concentrations and serum thyroid measures in U.S. adults and adolescents from the National Health and Nutrition Examination Survey (NHANES) 2007-2008". Environmental Health Perspectives. 119 (10): 1396–1402. doi:10.1289/ehp.1103582. ISSN 0091-6765. PMC 3230451. PMID 21749963. Wikidata Q28394488.
- John D. Meeker; David E Cantonwine; Luis O Rivera-González; et al. (March 19, 2013). "Distribution, variability, and predictors of urinary concentrations of phenols and parabens among pregnant women in Puerto Rico". Environmental Science & Technology. 47 (7): 3439–3447. doi:10.1021/es400510g. ISSN 0013-936X. PMC 3638245. PMID 23469879. Wikidata Q36800791.
- Alexander P Keil; Jessie P Buckley; Katie M O'Brien; Kelly K Ferguson; Shanshan Zhao; Alexandra J White (April 7, 2020). "A Quantile-Based g-Computation Approach to Addressing the Effects of Exposure Mixtures". Environmental Health Perspectives. 128 (4): 47004. arXiv:1902.04200. doi:10.1289/ehp5838. ISSN 0091-6765. PMC 7228100. PMID 32255670. Wikidata Q91628933.
