= Benjamin Ferguson =

Benjamin Ferguson may refer to:

- Ben Ferguson (born 1981), American radio host
- Ben Ferguson (snowboarder) (born 1995), American snowboarder
- Benjamin Ferguson (Wisconsin politician) (1820–1888), Wisconsin state senator
- Benjamin Ferguson (Indiana politician), member of the Indiana House of Representatives
- Benjamin F. Ferguson (?–1905), Chicago merchant and philanthropist
