= Matt Ferguson =

American businessman

- Born: November 30, 1966 (age 59); Bloomington, Indiana, U.S.
- Education: Indiana University Bloomington; University of Chicago Booth School of Business alumni Northwestern University Pritzker School of Law
- Occupation: Businessman
- Known for: Former American CEO for the largest online job site CareerBuilder.com.

Matt Ferguson (born November 30, 1966, in Bloomington, Indiana) is a former American Chief Executive Officer for the largest online job site CareerBuilder.com. He graduated from Indiana University Bloomington in 1989 with a Bachelor of Arts in political science. He also holds a Master of Business Administration from the University of Chicago Graduate School of Business and a J.D. degree from Northwestern University School of Law.

He joined CareerBuilder in 2000 and served as the vice president of business development and COO until 2004. He became CEO in 2004 and over the next few years turned CareerBuilder.com into the online recruitment industry leader.

On 23 October 2013, "The Talent Equation: Big Data Lessons for Navigating the Skills Gap and Building a Competitive Workforce" was published; it was co-authored by Ferguson, Lorin Hitt, and Prasanna Tambe.

Matt was replaced as CEO by former president and COO Irina Novoselsky. He currently sits as executive chairman on the board of Careerbuilder.

In 2004, Crain's Chicago Business named Ferguson one of the "40 under 40".

In 2007, Ferguson was awarded the Staffing Professional of the Year by the Staffing Management Association of Greater Chicago formerly EMA Chicago.
