= Patricia Ann Ferguson =

Scottish civil engineer (1936–2022)

Patricia Ann Ferguson (12 February 1936, Dundee – 24 March 2022, Auchterarder) was a Scottish civil engineer. She was chairwoman of Fife Health Board.

She studied at the High School of Dundee and St Margaret's School for Girls, and as a mature student, the University of St Andrews and the Royal Military College of Science, having been approved by Denis Healey. She was a chief civil engineer constructing oil platforms.

She was a competitive showjumper.
