= Billy Ferguson =

Northern Ireland footballer

Personal information
- Full name: William Ferguson
- Date of birth: 28 May 1938
- Place of birth: Belfast, Northern Ireland
- Date of death: 31 October 1998 (aged 60)
- Height: 5 ft 5 in (1.65 m)
- Position: Winger

Youth career
- Conlon Street Mission

Senior career*
Years	Team	Apps	(Gls)
1956–1958	Glentoran	1	(0)
1958–1969	Linfield	490	(159)
1969–1970	Ballymena United	37	(3)
Total		528	(162)

International career
1966	Northern Ireland	2	(1)
- * Club domestic league appearances and goals

William Ferguson (28 May 1938 – 31 October 1998) was a Northern Irish footballer who played as a winger.

== Career ==
Born in Belfast, Ferguson played for Conlon Street Mission, Glentoran, Linfield and Ballymena United. He also earned two caps for the Northern Ireland national team.
