= Martin Ferguson (footballer) =

Scottish football player and manager (born 1942)

Personal information
- Full name: Martin Murphy Ferguson
- Date of birth: 21 December 1942 (age 83)
- Place of birth: Glasgow, Scotland
- Position: Inside forward

Team information
- Current team: Airdrieonians (Associated Director)

Youth career
- Drumchapel Amateurs
- ?–1962: Kirkintilloch Rob Roy

Senior career*
Years	Team	Apps	(Gls)
1962–1965	Partick Thistle	13	(2)
1965	→ Morton (loan)	3	(1)
1965–1966	Barnsley	40	(17)
1966–1967	Doncaster Rovers	3	(0)
1967–1968	Waterford	11	(2)
Total		70	(22)

Managerial career
- 1967–1968: Waterford
- 1981–1982: East Stirlingshire
- 1982–1983: Albion Rovers
- * Club domestic league appearances and goals

Martin Murphy Ferguson (born 21 December 1942) is a Scottish former football player, manager and scout and was the chairman of Airdrieonians but stepped down from the role in June 2023 to be Associated Director. He is the brother of former Manchester United manager Alex Ferguson. He was Manchester United's chief European scout, and as such he was often sent to monitor players in mainland Europe.

== Career ==
Ferguson began his playing career at Kirkintilloch Rob Roy where he was capped for Scotland at Junior level before stepping up to Partick Thistle in 1962 where he made 25 appearances and scored 3 goals. He went on to Morton on loan and then a brief spell in the Football League with Barnsley and Doncaster Rovers during the mid-1960s.

He was appointed player-coach at Waterford in July 1967. He made his Blues debut in Peter Fitzgerald's testimonial in August 1967. His first league goal came in the dying seconds of a home clash with Shamrock Rovers on 19 November which led to Ferguson being chaired off the pitch. He was let go in February 1968.

He later worked as a coach at Hibernian, but was sacked in 1997. He was signed by Manchester United on the recommendation of his brother Alex, and scouted players such as future signings Diego Forlán, Anderson, and Ruud van Nistelrooy, as well as others who did not join the club including Fabio Quagliarella and Alessandro Nesta. Ferguson retired from his position as chief scout for Manchester United in May 2013, the same time as his brother retired as manager.

In January 2018, Ferguson was announced as vice-chairman of Airdrieonians In December of the same year, he became the North Lanarkshire club's chairman. He stepped down from the role in June 2023 to become the Associated Director of Airdrieonians.

== Career statistics ==
Appearances and goals by club, season and competition
Club	Season	League			National cup (Note: Includes Scottish Cup, FA Cup, FAI Cup)		League cup (Note: Includes Scottish League Cup, Football League Cup)		Europe		Total	
Club	Season	Division	Apps	Goals	Apps	Goals	Apps	Goals	Apps	Goals	Apps	Goals
Partick Thistle
Partick Thistle	1962–63	Division One		2		0	1+	0	—			2
Partick Thistle	1963–64	Division One		0		0		0	1 (Note: One appearance and one goal in Inter-Cities Fairs Cup)	1		1
Partick Thistle	1964–65	Division One		0		0		0	—			0
Morton (loan)	1964–65	Division One	3	1	—		—		—		3	1
Morton (loan)	Total		16	3		0		0	—		28	4
Barnsley	1965–66	Football League Fourth Division	40	17					—			
Doncaster Rovers	1966–67	Football League Fourth Division	3	0					—			
Waterford	1967–68	League of Ireland	11	2			—		1 (Note: One appearance in UEFA Cup)	0	12	2
Waterford	Total		54	19					—			
Career total			70	22					2	1		

== Honours ==
Waterford

- League of Ireland: 1967–68
- Top Four Cup: 1967–68
