= Alex Ferguson (disambiguation) =

Alex Ferguson (born 1941) is a former Scottish football player and manager.

Alex Ferguson, Alex Fergusson, Alexander Ferguson or Alexander Fergusson may also refer to:

== Ferguson ==
- Alex Ferguson (baseball) (James Alexander Ferguson, 1897–1976), American baseball player
- Alex Ferguson (footballer, born 1903) (Alexander Stirling Brown Ferguson, 1903–1974), Scottish footballer
- Alex Ferguson (footballer, born 1913) (Alexander Ferguson), Scottish footballer
- Alex Ferguson (jockey), British jockey who rode the winning horse in the 2017 Gerry Feilden Hurdle
- Alexander Ferguson (1860–1925), Canadian farmer and politician

== Fergusson ==
- Alex Fergusson (musician) (born 1952), Scottish guitarist and producer
- Alex Fergusson (politician) (1949–2018), Scottish politician
- Alexander Fergusson (1685–1749), Scottish politician

== See also ==
- Alejandro Ferguson (born 1978), known as Alec Ferguson, Argentine cricketer
- Alexander Ferguson MacLaren (1854–1917), Canadian businessman and politician
