= Harry Ferguson (footballer) =

Scottish footballer (1907–1983)

Personal information
- Full name: Henry Ferguson
- Date of birth: 1907
- Place of birth: Clackmannan, Scotland
- Date of death: 1983 (aged 75–76)
- Place of death: Alloa, Scotland
- Height: 5 ft 10 1/2 in (1.79 m)
- Positions: Wing half; inside forward

Senior career*
Years	Team	Apps	(Gls)
–	Alva Albion Rangers		
1925–1937	St Johnstone	258	(61)
1927	→ Alloa Athletic (loan)		
1928	→ King's Park (loan)		
1937–1938	Dunfermline Athletic	26	(8)
1938–1939	King's Park	23	(10)
Total		307	(79)
- * Club domestic league appearances and goals

Henry Ferguson (1907–1983) was a Scottish footballer who played as a wing half or inside forward, mainly for St Johnstone.

He spent twelve seasons with the Perth side (they were relegated from the top division in 1929–30 but were promoted again in 1931–32), with short loans to Alloa Athletic and King's Park, featuring solely in the Scottish Cup. He was eventually made Saints club captain, and was granted a testimonial against Manchester City in 1935. Two years later he moved on to Dunfermline Athletic for a single season, followed by a similar spell with King's Park before the outbreak of World War II brought his professional career to an end.
