= Ron Ferguson (footballer) =

English footballer

Personal information
- Full name: Ronald Charles Ferguson
- Date of birth: 9 February 1957
- Place of birth: Accrington, England
- Height: 6 ft 0 in (1.83 m)
- Position: Forward

Youth career
- –: Sheffield Wednesday

Senior career*
| Years | Team | Apps | (Gls) |
| 1974–1976 | Sheffield Wednesday | 11 | (1) |
| 1975–1976 | → Scunthorpe United (loan) | 3 | (0) |
| 1976–1980 | Darlington | 114 | (18) |
| 1980–1986 | Racing Jet de Bruxelles | 135 | (35) |
| 1986–1989 | La Louvière | 28 | (10) |
- * Club domestic league appearances and goals

Ronald Charles Ferguson (born 9 February 1957) is an English former footballer who played in the Football League for Sheffield Wednesday, Scunthorpe United and Darlington, and in the Belgian League for Racing Jet de Bruxelles and La Louvière, in the 1970s and 1980s. He played as a forward.

== Life and career ==
Ferguson was born in Accrington, Lancashire, and attended Queen Elizabeth's Grammar School in Gainsborough, Lincolnshire. He began his football career as a youngster with Sheffield Wednesday, and made his first-team debut on 9 November 1974, a couple of months after his 17th birthday; he scored the opening goal in a 3–0 defeat of York City in the Second Division. He finished the season with eleven appearances. In December 1975, he joined Fourth Division club Scunthorpe United on loan; he played three times without scoring. Sheffield Wednesday released Ferguson in the second half of the 1975–76 season, and he signed for Fourth Division Darlington, for whom he scored the only goal of the game against Torquay United on 15 March 1976.

In December 1976, Ferguson scored the only goal of the match to eliminate Wednesday from the 1976–77 FA Cup. The powerful drive, from a distance estimated at anything from 30 to 50 yards (25 to 45 m), was voted best goal ever seen at Darlington's Feethams ground in a 2003 poll on the occasion of the ground's closure. Two weeks later, he scored in the local derby with Hartlepool in less spectacular fashion, "scrambl[ing] in the equaliser" after an hour of the match. In something over four seasons with Darlington, he made 114 league appearances and scored 18 goals.

In 1980, Ferguson began a six-season spell with Racing Jet de Bruxelles, then of the Belgian Second Division. During that time they were relegated to the third tier, enjoyed two successive promotions to spend the 1984–85 season in the First Division, and returned to the Second. They were promoted in 1986, but that year Ferguson moved on to La Louvière, where he spent three seasons playing in the third tier.
