= Hannah Ferguson (commentator) =

Australian political commentator (born 1998)

- Born: 1998 (age 27–28); Marrickville, New South Wales, Australia
- Education: University of Queensland
- Known for: Founding Cheek Media
- Notable work: Big Small Talk; Bite Back; Taboo
- Political party: Independent
- Mother: Phillipa Mitchell

Hannah Ferguson (born 1998) is an Australian author and political commentator. She is the founder of social media news account Cheek Media.

== Early life ==
Hannah Ferguson studied law at the University of Queensland. She later worked for the Queensland Department of Public Prosecutions and served as an officer for the Electrical Trades Union. Her father is a truck driver and her mother is a small business owner.

== Career ==
Ferguson launched progressive social media news company Cheek Media in late 2020. She came up with the idea for Cheek Media in 2019 while volunteering at a feminist not-for-profit known as the One Woman Project when it was managed by Kristin Perissinotto. Perissinotto and Ferguson launched and published two editions of a bi-annual magazine called RARA. Perissinotto was later involved with the creation of Cheek Media, she was involved with the company until 2022. In 2023, Ferguson launched the podcast Big Small Talk alongside Sarah-Jane Adams. In July 2026, Cheek had about 4,000 paid subscribers on Substack, 252,000 followers on Instagram and 137,109 listeners to her podcast Big Small Talk. Cheek Media also has a presence on TikTok and organises live shows.

In 2023, Ferguson launched a book titled Bite Back: Feminism, media, politics, and our power to change it all. She authored another book titled Taboo that was released in November 2024.

At the National Press Club in May 2025, she announced her candidacy for the next Senate election in New South Wales. Her speech at the National Press Club also included calls to address a perceived lack of transparency around political content on social media and challenged traditional media narratives.

Ferguson announced her candidacy at the next federal election for Grayndler against prime minister Anthony Albanese in July 2026.

== Personal life ==
Ferguson was born in 1998 in Marrickville where she currently resides with her partner, who is a lawyer. Ferguson grew up in Ingleburn and Orange. Her mother is Phillipa Mitchell, a professional bra fitter.
