= Danny Ferguson (Scottish footballer) =

Scottish footballer

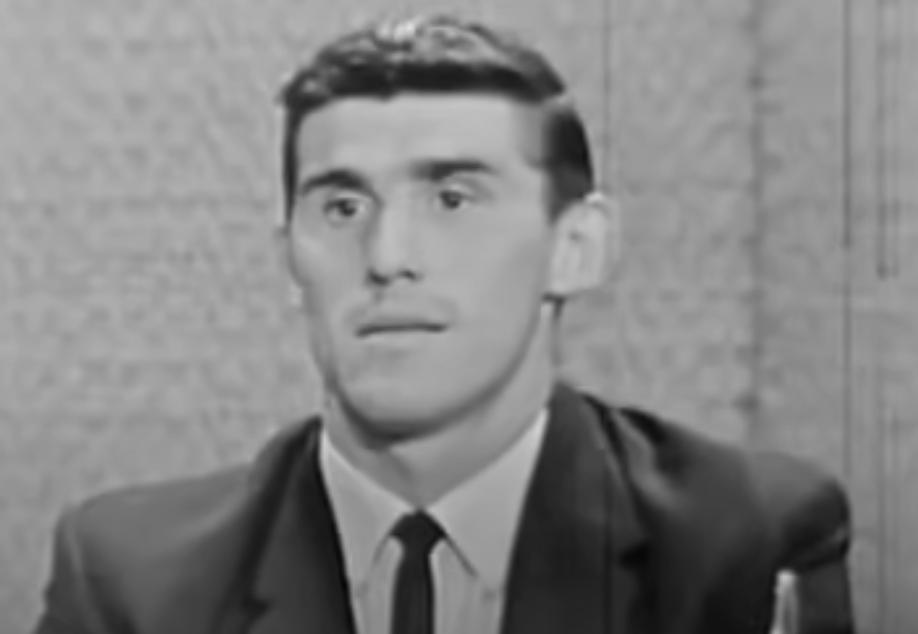
- Ferguson in 1964

Personal information
- Date of birth: 5 February 1939
- Place of birth: Prestonpans, Scotland
- Date of death: 1977 (aged 37–38)
- Position: Full-back

Youth career
- Ormiston Primrose

Senior career*
Years	Team	Apps	(Gls)
1958–1959	Hamilton Academical	17	(1)
1959–1967	Heart of Midlothian	127	(13)
1967–1968	Durban United		
1968–1970	Greenock Morton	54	(4)
1970–1971	Cowdenbeath	15	(0)
Total		213	(18)
- * Club domestic league appearances and goals

Danny Ferguson (5 February 1939 – 1977) was a Scottish footballer, who played for Hamilton, Hearts, Durban United, Morton and Cowdenbeath.

== Popular culture ==
Ferguson appeared as a contestant on the popular American game show What's My Line, on June 14, 1964.
