= William Gouw Ferguson =

Dutch painter

- Born: 1632/3
- Died: in or after 1689
- Known for: Painting

William Gouw (Gow or Gowe) Ferguson (1632/3 – in or after 1689) was a Scottish painter of still life.

== Biography ==
A native of Scotland, Ferguson is stated to have first studied art in his own country, and then travelled in France and Italy.

In 1660 Ferguson was living at the Hague, where he hired a house, and in 1668 he was still there. Part of the contract for his house consisted in a promise to paint a picture every year for the proprietor of the house. In 1681 he was living in the Batavier Graat, Amsterdam, and on 28 June he was betrothed to Sara van Someren of Stockholm. Horace Walpole mentioned that "he lived long in Italy and France".

The place and exact date of his death is unknown. His last known dated painting bears the year 1689. He is stated to have returned and to have died in London, but he may have returned to Scotland as twelve of his painting were sold in Edinburgh between 1692 and 1693.

== Works ==
Ferguson acquired a good reputation in painting dead game and still life. There are good examples of his paintings in this style in the Rijksmuseum at Amsterdam and in the Berlin Gallery. He also painted pictures introducing ruins and fragments of sculpture, with figures in the Italian style, under strong effects of light and shade. An example of this style is in the National Gallery of Scotland.

His pictures have in the past been considered favourably with works by then more fashionable artists, and signatures of Cornelis van Lelienbergh and Jan Weenix have been found on painting since attributed to him.

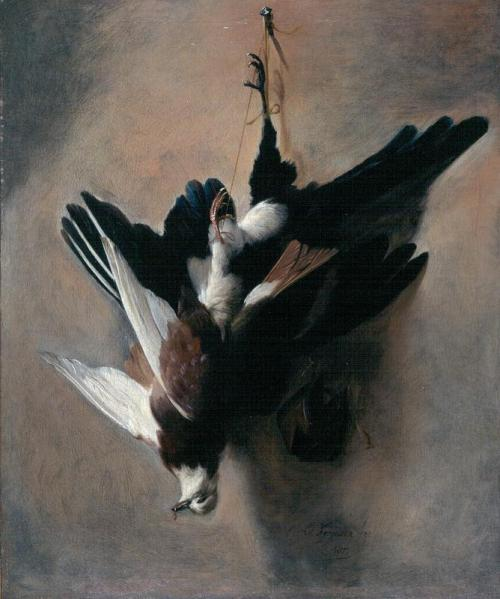
A Pigeon and Magpie, 1685, Aberdeen Art Gallery

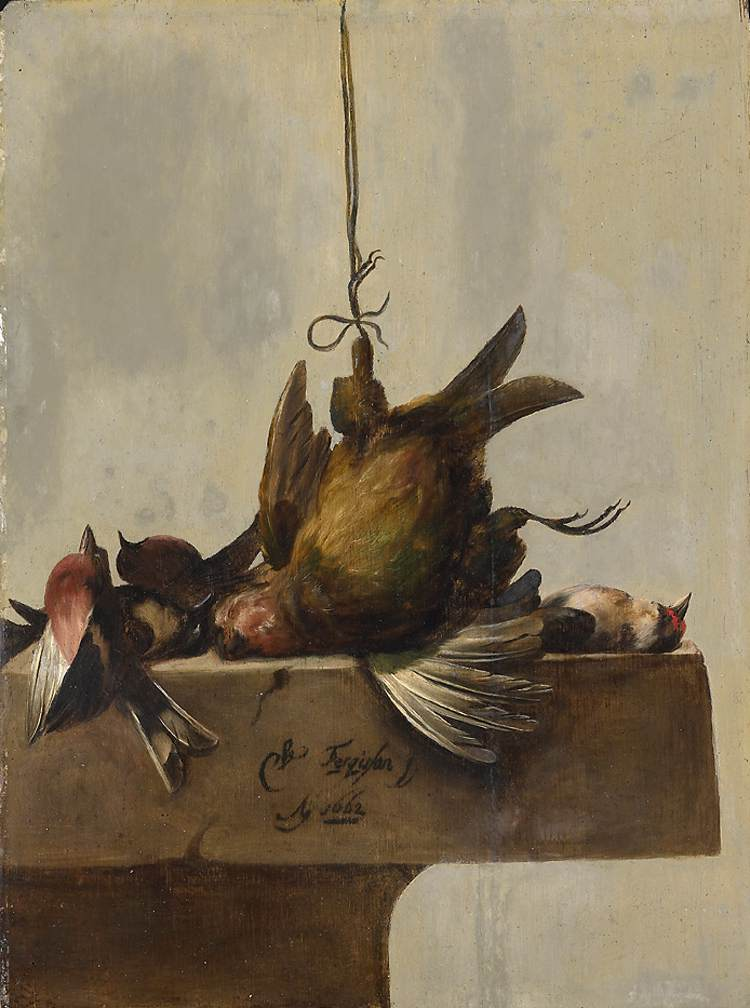
Still life with birds, 1662, Rijksmuseum

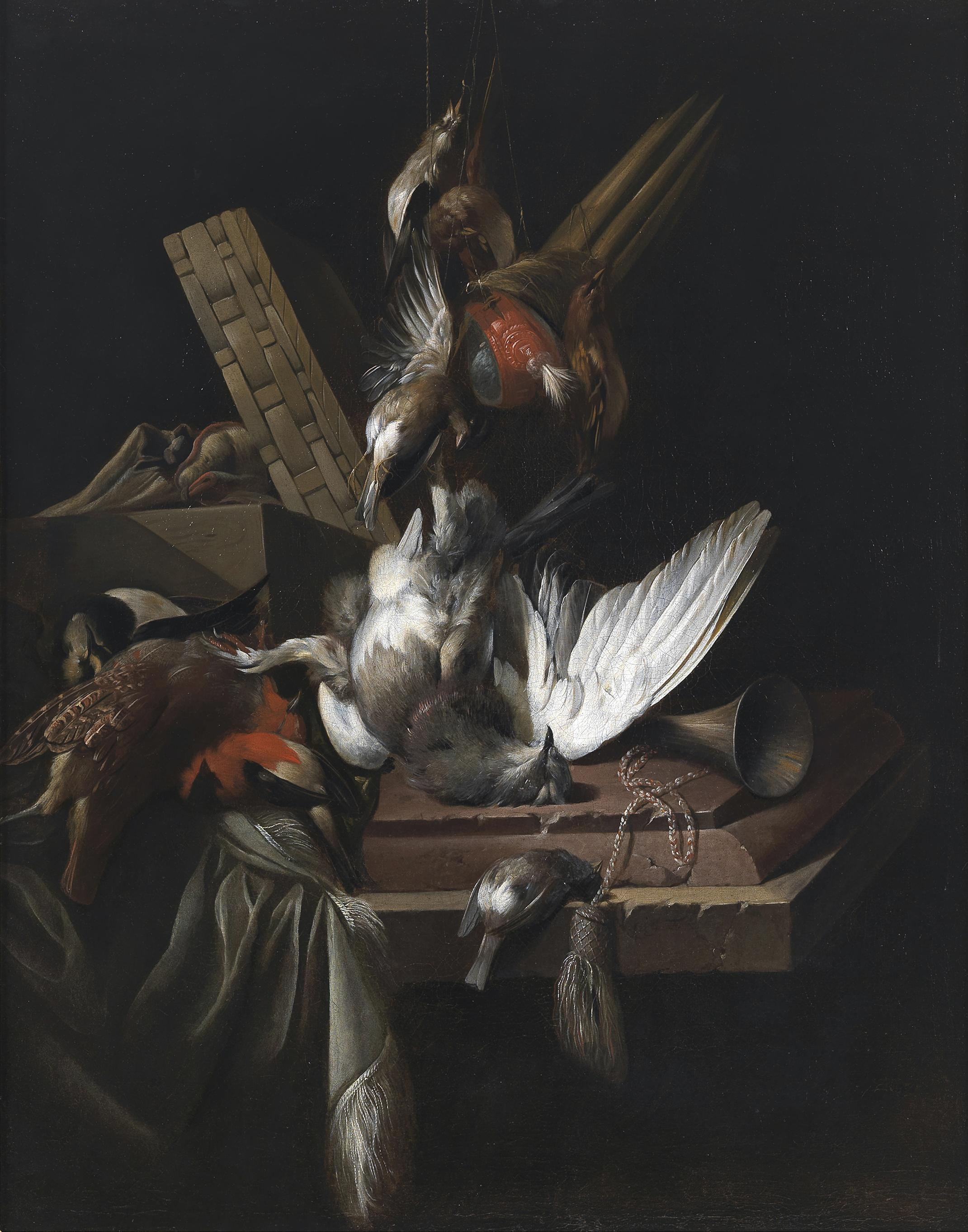
Still life with game birds and implements of the chase on a draped stone ledge

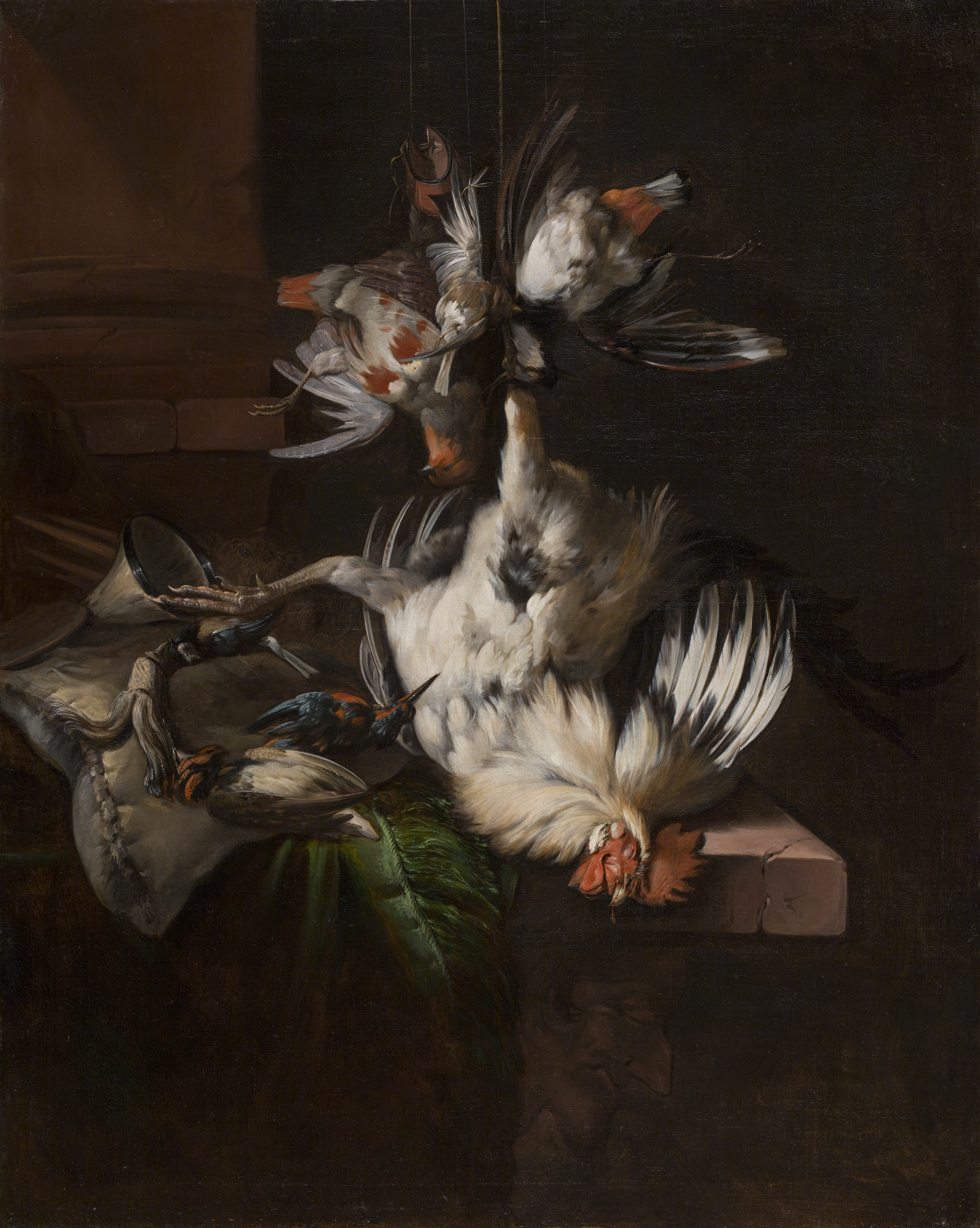
Still life with white cock, Museum of Fine Arts, Ghent
