= Rich Ferguson (magician) =

American magician

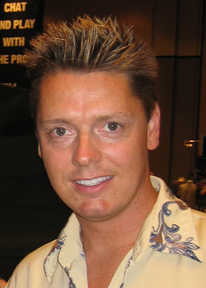
- Ferguson in July 2006 at the World Series of Poker
- Born: Richard Jeffrey Evans; December 1, 1970 (age 55); Salinas, California, U.S.
- Occupations: Magician, creative consultant, inventor, spokesperson
- Years active: 1997–present
- Spouse: Traci Ferguson (m. 2008; div. 2022)
- Website: Rich Ferguson

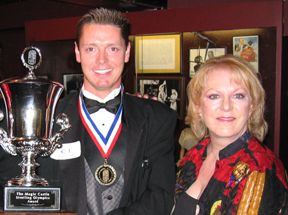
Rich Ferguson and Gay Blackstone at the world-famous Magic Castle.

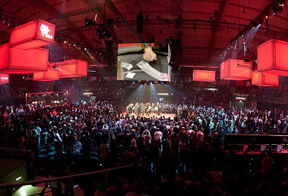
Ferguson performed sleight of hand for poker fans in Hamburg, Germany and Salzburg, Austria September 2–14, 2009.

Rich Ferguson (born Richard Jeffrey Evans; December 1, 1970), aka "The Ice Breaker", is an American magician. He is the producer and host of the Official Poker Chip Tricks and Card Handling DVD Series. Ferguson went to college for engineering and worked for United Parcel Service prior to becoming a full-time entertainer and creative consultant in 1997. Ferguson married Traci Adams August 8, 2008. Ferguson also has a YouTube channel with over 2.7 million subscribers.

== Early life ==
Ferguson was born Richard Evans in Salinas, California. His biological mother, Deborah Eden-Evans was murdered in 1974. His biological father, Ronnie Evans, has spent multiple life sentences in various penitentiaries since 1971. Ferguson was adopted at the late age of 12 by Roy and Margaret Ferguson in San Luis Obispo, California.

== Community commitment ==
In 2005, a Telly award-winning documentary was made about Rich's childhood. Rich has been recognized from city, state and congress for his community and business excellence receiving Congressional Certificates, The Everest Award and has been showcased during special events for groups like Social Services. Rich is seen on the cover of the San Luis Obispo city map, visitor's guide and business membership directory 2009-2010.

== Career ==
Some career highlights include 2007 NBC Phenomenon finalist, 2008 Best Entertainer (Central California Readers Poll - New Times), 2004 Magic Castle Gold Medal, 2005 Grand Champion Magician Nominee, 40 under 40 Business Award, 20 under 40 Business Award and 2008 Trick of the Year.

Rich Ferguson has been featured on the front page of The New Times, Pacific Coast Business Times, The San Luis Obispo Tribune and featured as a center spread in BLUFF, a popular gaming magazine which Rich wrote a monthly column for over two years. Ferguson showcased his Chip Tricks and Card Handling skills at the World Series of Poker in 2006.

In 2004, Ferguson produced and hosted a series of poker chip and card handling DVDs. Ferguson is also known for motivational speaking for at risk youth where he presents his keynote program called Magic Maker in which he focuses on overcoming obstacles and common sense.

In March 2011 Rich was a special guest on The Ellen DeGeneres Show. In October 2012, a Halloween prank video was showcased on The Tonight Show, and Right This Minute.

On April 1, 2013, Rich returned to The Today Show as their prank expert. In 2015, Rich appeared for his third time and created a prank segment disguised as a "Snacks with a twist."

On September 15, 2014, Suntoucher Software LLC launched a mobile app called A.I. Magic showcasing Rich Ferguson. The app allows users to use their phone to apparently do mind reading and cards tricks. The product was based around a video on YouTube in which viewers were offered $10,000 if they could prove the video was using actors even though Rich clearly claimed and demonstrated on that it was a technology trick which was completely impromptu and did not involve actors as claimed by numerous viewers of the video.
