= Rich Ferguson (runner) =

Richard K. Ferguson (August 3, 1931 – May 24, 1986) was a bronze medal winner and Canadian record breaker in the "Miracle Mile" race at the 1954 British Empire and Commonwealth Games, born in Calgary. He attended the University of Iowa. He won the Lionel Conacher Award in 1954. His son, with Canadian swimmer Kathleen McNamee, is Australian-born Canadian actor John Pyper-Ferguson.
