= List of people with the Korean family name Kim =

Kim is a common family name among ethnic Koreans. Approximately 22% of ethnic Koreans are named Kim. Following is a list of notable people with the Korean family name.

Note: Some people are listed in multiple sections.

== Business ==
- Kim Beom-soo (businessman) (born 1966), South Korean businessman
- Bom Kim (born 1978), Korean American businessman and entrepreneur
- Brian Kim (hedge fund manager) (born 1975/76), American former hedge fund manager
- Kim Jung-ju (1968–2022), South Korean businessman
- Michael Kim (businessman) (born 1963), Korean American businessman
- Sophie Kim (born 1983), South Korean entrepreneur
- Vladimir Kim (born 1960), Kazakhstani businessman
- W. Chan Kim (born 1951), South Korean business theorist
- Kim Woo-choong (1936–2019), South Korean businessman

== Entertainment ==
=== Acting ===
- Kim Ae-ran (actress) (born 1971), South Korean actress
- Kim Ah-joong (born 1982), South Korean actress
- Kim Ah-yeong (born 1972), South Korean voice actor
- Alan Kim (born 2012), American actor
- Kim Bo-yoon (born 2001), South Korean actress
- Yeon Woo-jin (born Kim Bong-hwe, 1984), South Korean actor
- Kim Bum (born 1989), South Korean actor
- Kim Baek-bong (1927–2023), South Korean choreographer and dancer
- Kim Byeong-ok (born 1960), South Korean actor
- Kim Byung-chul (actor) (born 1974), South Korean actor
- Kim Byung-ki (born 1948), South Korean actor
- Kim Byung-se (born 1962), South Korean actor
- Catherine Haena Kim (born 1984), American actress and model
- Young Mazino (born Christopher Young Kim, 1991), American actor
- Claudia Kim (born 1985), South Korean actress and model
- Lee Bom-so-ri (born Kim Da-hye, 1992), South Korean actress
- Kim Da-mi (born 1995), South Korean actress
- Kim Dae-gon (actor) (born 1983), South Korean actor
- Daniel Dae Kim (born 1968), Korean-American actor
- Kim Dong-hee (actor) (born 1999), South Korean actor
- Kim Dong-ho (born 1985), South Korean actor
- Kim Dong-wook (born 1983), South Korean actor
- Kim Eung-soo (born 1961), South Korean actor
- Evan C. Kim (born 1953), American actor
- Kim Ga-eun (born 1989), South Korean actress
- Kim Ga-yeon (born 1972), South Korean actress
- Kim Go-eun (born 1991), South Korean actress
- Kim Gyu-ri (actress, born June 1979), South Korean actress
- Kim Gyu-ri (actress, born August 1979), South Korean actress
- Kim Ha-eun (born 1984), South Korean actress
- Kim Ha-neul (born 1978), South Korean actress
- Kang Ha-neul (born Kim Ha-neul, 1990), South Korean actor
- Kim Ha-yeon (actress) (born 2010), South Korean actress
- Kim Hae-sook (born 1955), South Korean actress
- Kim Hee-ae (born 1967), South Korean actress
- Kim Hee-jung (actress, born 1970), South Korean actress
- Kim Hee-jung (actress, born 1992), South Korean actress
- Kim Hee-sun (born 1977), South Korean actress
- Kim Hieora (born 1989), South Korean actress
- Kim Hwan-hee (born 2002), South Korean actress
- Kim Hyang-gi (born 2000), South Korean actress
- Kim Hye-eun (born 1973), South Korean actress
- Kim Hye-ja (born 1941), South Korean actress and humanitarian
- Kim Hye-jun (born 1995), South Korean actress
- Kim Hye-soo (born 1970), South Korean actress
- Kim Hye-yoon (born 1996), South Korean actress and model
- Kim Hyo-jin (born 1984), South Korean actress and model
- Kim Hyun-jin (born 1996), South Korean actor and model
- Kim Hyun-joo (born 1977), South Korean actress
- Joo Hyun-young (born Kim Hyun-young, 1996), South Korean actress
- Kim Il-woo (actor, born 1953) (1953–2004), South Korean actor
- Kim Il-woo (actor, born 1963), South Korean actor
- Kim In-kwon (born 1978), South Korean actor
- Kim In-seo (born 1984), South Korean actress
- Jacqueline Kim (born 1965), American actress and writer
- Kim Jae-hwa (born 1980), South Korean actress
- Kim Jae-kyung (born 1988), South Korean actress and singer
- Kim Jaewon (born 1981), South Korean actor
- Kim Jae-won (actor, born 2001), South Korean actor and model
- Kim Jae-wook (born 1983), South Korean actor and model
- Kim Jeong-hoon (born 1980), South Korean actor and singer
- Kim Ji-eun (born 1993), South Korean actress
- Kim Ji-hoon (actor, born 1981), South Korean actor
- Kim Ji-hoon (actor, born 2000), South Korean actor
- Kim Ji-hyun (actress) (born 1982), South Korean actress
- Kim Ji-in (born 1996), South Korean actress
- Kim Ji-soo (actress, born 1972), South Korean actress
- Kim Ji-soo (born 1993), South Korean actor
- Kim Ji-won (actress) (born 1992), South Korean actress
- Kim Ji-young (actress, born 1938) (1938–2017), South Korean actress
- Kim Ji-young (actress, born 1974), South Korean actress
- Kim Ji-young (actress, born 2005), South Korean actress
- Kim Jin-young (actress) (born 2003), South Korean actress
- Kim Jong-kook (born 1976), South Korean singer and actor
- Go Yoon (born Kim Jong-min, 1988), South Korean actor
- Kim Jong-soo (actor) (born 1964), South Korean actor
- Kim Joo-ah (born 2004), South Korean actress
- Kim Joo-hun (born 1980), South Korean actor
- Kim Joo-hyuk (1972–2017), South Korean actor
- Kim Joo-ryoung (born 1976), South Korean actress
- Kim Joon (born 1984), South Korean actor and rapper
- Kim Ju-yeon (born 1993), South Korean actress
- Kim Jun-han (born 1983), South Korean actor, film director, screenwriter
- Kim Jung-nan (born 1971), South Korean actress
- Kim Jung-young (born 1972), South Korean actress
- Kim Kang-hoon (born 2009), South Korean actor
- Kim Kang-min (actor, born 1995), South Korean actor
- Kim Kang-min (actor, born 1998), South Korean actor
- Kim Kang-woo (born 1978), South Korean actor
- Kim Kap-soo (born 1957), South Korean actor
- Kathleen Kim, American puppeteer on Sesame Street
- Kim Ki-bang (born 1981), South Korean actor
- Kim Ki-bum (born 1987), South Korean actor and singer
- Kim Ki-hyeon (born 1945), South Korean voice actor
- Chae Seo-jin (born Kim Ko-woon, 1994), South Korean actress
- Kim Kwang-kyu (actor) (born 1967), South Korean actor
- Kim Kwon (born 1989), South Korean actor
- Kim Kyu-chul (born 1960), South Korean actor
- Kim Kyung-nam (born 1989), South Korean actor
- Han Ye-seul (born Leslie Kim, 1981), South Korean actress
- Oh Yeon-ah (born Kim Mi-ae, 1981), South Korean actress
- Kim Mi-kyung (born 1963), South Korean actress
- Cha Mi-kyung (born Kim Mi-kyung, 1965), South Korean actress
- Kim Mi-soo (1992–2022), South Korean actress
- Kim Mi-sook (born 1959), South Korean actress
- Song Ha-yoon (born Kim Mi-sun, 1986), South Korean actress
- Kim Min-chul (actor) (born 2000), South Korean actor
- Kim Min-gi (born 2002), South Korean actor
- Kim Min-ha (born 1995), South Korean actress
- Kim Min-hee (actress, born 1972), South Korean actress and trot singer
- Kim Min-hee (actress, born 1982), South Korean actress
- Kim Min-jae (actor, born 1979), South Korean actor
- Kim Min-jae (actor, born 1996), South Korean actor
- Kim Min-ju (born 2001), South Korean actress and former singer
- Kim Min-jung (actress) (born 1982), South Korean actress
- Gong Min-jeung (born Kim Min-jung, 1986), South Korean actress
- Kim Min-kyo (born 1974), South Korean actor and director
- Kim Min-kyu (actor) (born 1994), South Korean actor
- Kim Min-kyu (entertainer) (born 2001), South Korean actor, model, and singer
- Kim Min-seok (actor) (born 1990), South Korean actor
- Kim Mu-yeol (born 1982), South Korean actor
- Kim Mu-saeng (1943–2005), South Korean actor
- Kim Myung-min (born 1972), South Korean actor
- Kim Nam-gil (born 1980), South Korean actor
- Kim Nam-hee (born 1986), South Korean actor
- Kim Nam-joo (actress) (born 1971), South Korean actress
- Kim Ok-vin (born 1987), South Korean actress
- Kim Rae-won (born 1981), South Korean actor
- Randall Duk Kim (born 1943), American actor
- Kim Sa-rang (actress) (born 1978), South Korean actress
- Kim Sae-byuk (born 1986), South Korean actress
- Kim Sae-ron (2000–2025), South Korean actress
- Lee Ji-ah (born Kim Sang-eun, 1978), South Korean actress
- Kim Sang-joong (born 1965), South Korean actor
- Kim Se-ah (born 1974), South Korean actress and model
- Kim Seo-hyung (born 1973), South Korean actress
- Kim Seon-ho (born 1986), South Korean actor
- Kim Seung-ho (1917–1968), South Korean actor
- Kim Seung-jun (voice actor) (born 1967), South Korean voice actor
- Kim Seung-soo (born 1971), South Korean actor
- Kim Seung-woo (born 1969), South Korean actor and talk show host
- Kim Shin-rok (born 1981), South Korean actress
- Kim Si-a (born 2008), South Korean actress
- Kim Si-eun (actress, born 1999), South Korean actress
- Kim Si-eun (actress, born 2000), South Korean actress
- Kim Si-hoo (born 1988), South Korean actor
- Kim So-eun (born 1989), South Korean actress
- Kim So-jin (born 1979), South Korean actress
- Kim So-yeon (born 1980), South Korean actress
- Kim So-hyun (born 1999), South Korean actress
- Kim Soo-hyun (born 1988), South Korean actor
- Kim Soo-mi (1949–2024), South Korean actress
- Kim Soo-ro (born 1970), South Korean actor
- Kim Su-an (born 2006), South Korean actress
- Kim Su-gyeom (born 2001), South Korean actor
- Kim Suk-hoon (born 1972), South Korean actor
- Kim Sun-a (born 1975), South Korean actress
- Kim Sun-young (actress, born 1976), South Korean actress
- Kim Sun-young (actress, born 1980), South Korean actress
- Kim Sung-cheol (born 1991), South Korean actor
- Ha Jung-woo (born Kim Sung-hoon, 1978), South Korean actor and director
- Kim Sung-kyu (actor, born 1986), South Korean actor
- Kim Sung-kyun (born 1980), South Korean actor
- Kim Sung-oh (born 1978), South Korean actor
- Kim Sung-ryung (born 1967), South Korean actress and beauty pageant titleholder
- Kim Sung-soo (actor) (born 1973), South Korean actor and television host
- Kim Tae-hee (born 1980), South Korean actress
- Kim Tae-hoon (actor) (born 1975), South Korean actor
- Kim Tae-jung (actor) (born 1999), South Korean actor
- Hyun Bin (born Kim Tae-pyung, 1982), South Korean actor
- Kim Tae-ri (born 1990), South Korean actress
- Kim Tae-woo (actor) (born 1971), South Korean actor
- Kim Tae-yeon (actress) (born 1976), South Korean actress
- Kim Won-hae (born 1969), South Korean actor
- Kim Woo-bin (born 1989), South Korean actor and model
- Kim Woo-seok (actor) (born 1994), South Korean actor
- Han Ye-ri (born Kim Ye-ri, 1984), South Korean actress
- Kim Ye-ryeong (born 1966), South Korean actress
- Kim Ye-won (actress, born 1987), South Korean actress and singer
- Kim Ye-won (actress, born 1997), South Korean actress
- Kim Yeo-jin (born 1972), South Korean actress and activist
- Kim Yeong-cheol (actor) (born 1953), South Korean actor
- Ha Do-kwon (born Kim Yong-goo, 1977), South Korean actor
- Kim Yong-gun (born 1946), South Korean actor
- Kim Yong-ji (actress) (born 1991), South Korean actress
- Kim Yong-rim (born 1940), South Korean actress
- Eugene (actress) (born Kim Yoo-jin, 1981), South Korean actress and singer
- Kim You-jung (born 1999), South Korean actress
- Kim Yoo-mi (actress) (born 1979), South Korean actress
- Kim Yoo-ri (born 1984), South Korean actress
- Kim Yoon-hye (born 1991), South Korean actress
- Kim Yoon-seo (born 1986), South Korean actress
- Kim Yoon-seok (born 1968), South Korean actor and film director
- Kim Young-ae (1951–2017), South Korean actress
- Kim Young-dae (born 1996), South Korean actor
- Kim Young-hoon (born 1978), South Korean actor
- Kim Young-min (actor) (born 1971), South Korean actor
- Kim Young-ok (actress) (born 1937), South Korean actress
- Kim Young-ran (actress) (born 1956), South Korean actress
- Kim Yu-mi (beauty pageant titleholder) (born 1990), South Korean actress and beauty pageant titleholder
- Kim Yu-seok (born 1966), South Korean actor
- Kim Yun-jin (born 1973), Korean-American actress

=== Comedy ===
- Kim Gura (born 1970), South Korean comedian
- Kim Ji-min (comedian) (born 1984), South Korean comedian
- Kim Jun-ho (comedian) (born 1975), South Korean comedian
- Kim Saeng-min (born 1973), South Korean television presenter and comedian
- Kim Sook (comedian) (born 1975), South Korean comedian

=== Esports ===
- Fleta (gamer) (born Kim Byung-sun, 1999), South Korean professional Overwatch League player
- Ssumday (born Kim Chan-ho), South Korea professional League of Legends player
- Canna (gamer) (born Kim Chang-dong, 2000), South Korea professional League of Legends player
- Garimto (born Kim Dong-soo, 1981), South Korean Starcraft professional gamer
- Trick (gamer) (born Kim Gang-yun, c. 1995), South Korea professional League of Legends player
- Haksal (born Kim Hyo-jong c. 2000), South Korean professional Overwatch League player
- Deft (gamer) (born Kim Hyuk-kyu, 1996), South Korean professional League of Legends player
- Fenix (gamer) (born Kim Jae-hun), South Korean professional League of Legends player
- Kkoma (born Kim Jeong-gyun, 1985), South Korean professional League of Legends player and coach
- birdring (born Kim Ji-hyeok, c. 1998), South Korean professional Overwatch League player
- Alarm (gamer) (born Kim Kyeong-bo, 2001–2021), professional Overwatch League player
- Rambo (gamer) (born Ronald Kim, 1983), American professional Counter Strike player
- Geguri (born Kim Se-yeon, 1999), professional Overwatch League player
- Bisu (gamer) (born Kim Taek-yong, 1989), South Korean Starcraft professional gamer
- sOs (gamer) (born Kim Yoo-jin), South Korean Starcraft II professional gamer

=== Music ===
- Giselle (singer) (born Kim Aeri, 2000) South Korean-Japanese singer, member of girl group aespa
- Allen Kim (born 1990), South Korean singer
- Akiko Wada (born Kim Bok-ja, 1950), Zainichi Korean singer
- Kim Bum-soo (born 1979), South Korean singer
- Kim Chaewon (born 2000), South Korean singer, member of girl group Le Sserafim
- Chungha (born Kim Chung-ha, 1996), South Korean singer
- Dahyun (born Kim Da-hyun, 1998), South Korean singer and rapper, member of girl group Twice
- Kim Da-som (born 1993), South Korean singer and actress
- Dabit (born David Kim, 1989), Korean-American singer-songwriter
- Kim Do-yeon (singer) (born 1999), South Korean singer
- DK (born Kim Dong-hyuk, 1997), South Korean singer and dancer, member of boy band iKON
- Kim Dong-ryul (born 1974), South Korean singer-songwriter
- Kim Dong-wan (born 1979), South Korean singer and actor, member of boy band Shinhwa
- Doyoung (singer) (born Kim Dong-young, 1996), South Korean singer, member of boy band NCT
- Eli Kim (born 1991), Korean-American singer, member of boy band U-KISS
- Kim Gun-mo (born 1968), South Korean singer-songwriter
- Haon (rapper) (born Kim Ha-on, 2000), South Korean rapper
- B.I (rapper) (born Kim Han-bin, 1996), South Korean rapper and record producer
- Kim Hee-chul (born 1983), South Korean singer, member of boy band Super Junior
- Kim Hong-joong (born 1998), South Korean rapper, leader of boy band ATEEZ
- JeA (born Kim Hyo-jin, 1981), South Korean singer, member of girl group Brown Eyed Girls
- Dawn (rapper) (born Kim Hyo-jong, 1994), South Korean rapper and singer-songwriter
- Hyolyn (born Kim Hyo-jung, 1990), South Korean singer
- Kim Hyo-yeon (born 1989), South Korean singer, dancer, DJ, member of girl group Girls' Generation
- Hyuna (born Kim Hyun-ah, 1992), South Korean singer-songwriter and rapper
- Kim Hyun-joong (born 1986), South Korean singer and actor, member of boy band SS501
- Hoody (singer) (born Kim Hyun-jung, 1990), South Korean singer-songwriter
- Kim Hyung-jun (born 1987), South Korean singer and actor, member of boy band SS501
- Bibi (singer) (born Kim Hyung-seo, 1998), South Korean singer-songwriter
- K.Will (born Kim Hyung-soo, 1981), South Korean singer
- Kim Il-jin (born 1956), North Korean conductor
- Insooni (born Kim In-soon, 1957), South Korean singer
- Kim Isak (born 1985), German-born American singer and radio personality
- Kim Jae-duck (born 1979), South Korean singer, member of boy band Sechs Kies
- Kim Jae-hwan (singer) (born 1996), South Korean singer
- Kim Jae-joong (born 1986), South Korean singer and actor, member of duo JYJ
- Jennie Kim (born 1996), South Korean singer, member of girl group Blackpink
- Coogie (born Kim Jeong-hun, 1994), South Korean rapper and songwriter
- Kim Ji-soo (singer, born 1990) (born 1990), South Korean singer
- Jisoo (born Kim Ji-soo, 1995), South Korean singer and actress, member of girl group Blackpink
- Kim Ji-sook (singer) (born 1990), South Korean singer and actress
- Bobby (rapper) (born Kim Ji-won, 1995), South Korean rapper, member of boy band iKON
- Chuu (born Kim Ji-woo, 1999), South Korean singer
- Kim Ji-woong (born 1998), South Korean singer and actor, member of boy band Zerobaseone
- Bona (singer) (born Kim Ji-yeon, 1995), South Korean singer and actress, member of girl group WJSN
- Kei (singer) (born Kim Ji-yeon, 1995), South Korean singer, member of girl group Lovelyz
- Kim Jin-pyo (musician) (born 1977), South Korean rapper, television presenter and professional race car driver
- Jay (born Kim Jin-hwan, 1994), South Korean singer, member of boy band iKON
- Verbal Jint (born Kim Jin-tae, 1980), South Korean rapper and record producer
- Chen (singer) (born Kim Jong-dae, 1992), South Korean singer, member of boy band Exo
- Kim Jong-hyun (1990–2017), South Korean singer
- Kim Jong-hyeon (born 1995), South Korean singer
- Kai (entertainer, born 1994) (born Kim Jong-in), South Korean singer, member of boy band Exo
- Kim Jong-kook (born 1976), South Korean singer and actor
- Kim Jong-min (born 1979), South Korean singer, member of band Koyote
- Yesung (born Kim Jong-woon, 1984), South Korean singer, member of boy band Super Junior
- Kim Ju-hoon (born 2008), South Korean singer, dancer and member of boy band Cortis
- Suho (born Kim Jun-myeon, 1991), South Korean singer, member of boy band Exo
- Kim Junsu (born 1986), South Korean singer, member of duo JYJ
- Key (entertainer) (born Kim Ki-bum, 1991), South Korean singer, member of boy band Shinee
- Kim Kwang-suk (1964–2018), North Korean singer, member of Pochonbo Electronic Ensemble
- Kim Kyu-jong (born 1987), South Korean singer, member of boy band SS501
- Kim Kyung-ho (born 1971), South Korean singer
- Mingyu (born Kim Min-gyu, 1997), South Korean rapper, member of boy band Seventeen
- Winter (singer) (born Kim Min-jeong, 2001), South Korean singer, member of girl group aespa
- Minji (singer) (born Kim Min-ji, 2004), South Korean singer, member of girl group NewJeans
- Kim Min-ju (born 2001), South Korean singer
- Jun. K (born Kim Min-jun, 1988), South Korean singer, member of boy band 2PM
- Xiumin (born Kim Minseok, 1990), South Korean singer, member of boy band Exo
- L (entertainer) (born Kim Myung-soo, 1992), South Korean singer, member of boy band Infinite
- Kim Nam-joo (singer) (born 1995), South Korean singer, member of girl group Apink
- RM (musician) (born Kim Nam-joon, 1994), South Korean rapper, songwriter and producer, member of boy band BTS
- Kim Na-young (singer) (born 1991), South Korean singer
- Kim Ryeo-wook (born 1987), South Korean singer, member of boy band Super Junior
- Sam Kim (born 1998), American singer-songwriter
- Samuel (singer) (born Samuel Arredondo Kim, 2002), American singer
- Roy Kim (born Kim Sang-woo, 1993), South Korean singer-songwriter
- Kim Se-jeong (born 1996), South Korean singer and actress
- Sehyeon (born Kim Se-hyeon, 2000), South Korean singer, member of boy band DKZ
- Kim Se-yong (born 1991), South Korean singer, member of boy band Myname
- Kim Seung-min (born 2000), South Korean singer, member of boy band Stray Kids
- Jin (singer) (born Kim Seok-jin, 1992), South Korean singer, member of boy band BTS
- Kim Seol-hyun (born 1995), South Korean singer and actress, member of girl group AOA
- Sunoo (born Kim Seon-woo, 2003), South Korean singer, member of boy band ENHYPEN
- Kim Si-hyeon (born 1999), South Korean singer, member of girl group Everglow
- Kim So-hee (singer, born 1995), South Korean singer
- Kim So-hee (singer, born 1999), South Korean singer
- Sohyang (born Kim So-hyang, 1978), South Korean singer-songwriter
- Kim So-hye (born 1999), South Korean singer and actress
- Soya (singer) (born Kim So-ya, 1990), South Korean singer
- Stephanie Kim (born 1987), American singer, ballerina, and musical actress
- Kim Sung-jae (1972–1995), South Korean singer
- Kim Sung-kyu (born 1989), South Korean singer, member of boy band Infinite
- V (singer) (born Kim Tae-hyung, 1995), South Korean singer, member of boy band BTS
- Kim Tae-woo (singer) (born 1981), South Korean singer, member of boy band g.o.d
- Taeyeon (born Kim Tae-yeon, 1989), South Korean singer, member of girl group Girls' Generation
- Ravi (rapper) (born Kim Wonsik, 1993), South Korean rapper
- Kim Woo-jin (born 1997), South Korean singer
- Kim Woo-seok (born 1996), South Korean singer and actor
- Kim Yeon-ji (born 1986), South Korean singer, former member of girl group SeeYa
- Yeri (singer) (born Kim Ye-rim, 1999), South Korean singer and actress, member of girl group Red Velvet
- Umji (born Kim Ye-won, 1998), South Korean singer, member of girl group Viviz
- Kim Yeon-woo (born 1971), South Korean singer and vocal coach
- Yugyeom (born Kim Yu-Gyeom, 1997), South Korean singer, member of boy group Got7
- Kim Yo-han (born 1999), South Korean singer, member of boy band WEi
- Solar (singer) (born Kim Yong-sun, 1991), South Korean singer, member of girl group Mamamoo
- Kim Yoon-ji (born 1988), Korean-American singer
- Kim Yu-bin (musician) (born 1988), South Korean singer
- Yuliy Kim (born 1936), Russian musician
- Yura (South Korean singer) (born Kim Yu-ra, 1992), South Korean singer, member of girl group Girl's Day
- Mimi (singer) (born Kim Mi-hyun, 1995), South Korean rapper and singer, member of girl group Oh My Girl
- J.Seph (born Kim Tae-hyung, 1992), South Korean rapper, member of co-ed group Kard

=== Professional wrestling ===
- Gail Kim (born 1977), Canadian professional wrestler
- Rikidōzan (born Kim Sin-rak, 1924–1963), Korean-Japanese professional wrestler
- Kintarō Ōki (born Kim Tae-sik, 1929-2006), South Korean professional wrestler

=== Other entertainment ===
- Kim Eana (born 1979), South Korean lyricist
- Jonah Kim (born 1988), South Korean cellist
- Kim Ki-duk (1960–2020), South Korean film director and screenwriter
- Kim Ki-duk (director, born 1934) (1934–2017), South Korean film director
- Kim Kyung-ju (born 1976), South Korean poet and performance artist
- Marina Kim (born 1983), Russian television presenter
- Kim Sang-man (born 1970), South Korean film director and art director
- Scott Kim, (born 1955), American puzzle and video game designer
- Tanya Kim, Korean-Canadian television personality
- Kenzie (songwriter) (born Kim Yeon-jung, 1976), South Korean songwriter and producer
- Kangin (born Kim Young-woon, 1985), South Korean entertainer

== Fashion ==
- André Kim (1935–2010), South Korean fashion designer
- Christina Kim (fashion designer) (born 1957), American fashion designer
- Daul Kim (1989–2009), South Korean model
- Elaine Kim (fashion designer) (born 1962), American fashion designer
- Eugenia Kim, American hat designer
- Jenny Kim (born 1994), South Korean model and beauty pageant titleholder
- Yu-ri Kim (1989–2011), South Korean model

== Military ==
- Alexei Kim (born 1958), Russian colonel general
- Jonny Kim (born 1984), American sailor, physician, and astronaut
- Richard C. Kim, American brigadier general
- Kim Shin-jo (1942–2025), North Korean soldier becoming South Korean pastor
- Young-Oak Kim (1919-2005), Korean-American colonel, civic leader and humanitarian

== Politics ==
=== Pre-1945 Korea ===
- Kim Chajŏm (1588–1652), Korean scholar-official
- Kim Gu (1876–1949), Korean independence activist and politician
- Kim Hong-jip (1842–1896), Korean politician

=== North Korea ===
- Kim Il (politician) (1910–1984), North Korean politician
- Kim Il Sung (1912–1994), North Korean politician and revolutionary, President 1948-1944
- Kim Jong Il (1941–2011), North Korean politician
- Kim Jong-nam (1971–2017), North Korean spy, son of Kim Jong Il
- Kim Jong Un (born 1983), North Korean politician
- Kim Kuk-thae (1924–2013), North Korean politician
- Kim Kum-ok (born 1988), North Korean long-distance runner and politician
- Kim Kye-gwan (born 1943), North Korean politician and diplomat
- Kim Phyong-hae (born 1941), North Korean politician
- Kim Yo-jong (born 1987), North Korean politician and diplomat
- Kim Yong-il (born 1944), North Korean politician
- Kim Yong-nam (1928–2025), North Korean politician

=== South Korea ===
- Kim Dae-jung (1924–2009), South Korean politician and activist
- Kim Dong-ah (born 1987), South Korean politician
- Kim Du-han (1918–1972), South Korean mobster and politician
- Kim Hwang-sik (born 1948), South Korean lawyer and politician
- Kim Hyong-o (1947–2025), South Korean writer and politician
- Kim Jin-sun (born 1946), South Korean politician
- Kim Jong-pil (1926–2018), South Korean politician
- Kim Kwan-yong (born 1942), South Korean politician
- Kim Geum-hyok (born 1991), North Korean and South Korean, policy adviser and activist
- Kim Kyoung-soo (born 1967), South Korean politician
- Kim Moon-soo (politician) (born 1951), South Korean politician
- Kim Soo-han (1928–2024), South Korean speaker of the National Assembly 1996–98
- Kim Wan-ju (born 1946), South Korean politician
- Kim Young-sam (1927–2015), South Korean politician and activist
- Kim Yung-rok (born 1955), South Korean politician

=== United Kingdom ===
- Joshua Kim, Welsh politician

=== United States ===
- Andy Kim (politician) (born 1982), American politician
- Harry Kim (politician) (born 1939), American politician
- Jane Kim (born 1977), American attorney and politician
- Jay Kim (born 1939), Korean-American politician
- Patty Kim (politician) (born 1973), American politician
- Ron Kim (politician) (born 1979), American politician
- Sung Kim (born 1960), American diplomat
- Young Kim (born 1962), South Korean-born American politician

=== Ukraine ===
- Vitalii Kim (born 1981), Ukrainian politician

=== Indonesia ===
- Chong Sung Kim (born 1964), South Korean-born Indonesian politician

== Religion ==
- Andrew Kim Taegon (1821–1846), Korean Catholic priest
- Augustinus Kim Jong-soo (born 1956), South Korean prelate of the Catholic Church
- David Kwangshin Kim (1935-2022), South Korean Protestant pastor
- Kim Gyo-gak (696-794), Korean Buddhist monk
- Hae Jong Kim (1935-2020), Korean-American bishop
- Heup Young Kim (born 1949), Korean Christian theologian
- Hyginus Kim Hee-jong (born 1947), Korean Roman Catholic priest
- Paul Geun Sang Kim (born 1952), Korean Anglican bishop
- Paul Kim Ok-kyun (1925–2010), Korean Roman Catholic bishop
- Stephen Kim Sou-hwan (1922–2009), Korean Roman Catholic cardinal and archbishop
- Theophanes (Kim) (born 1976), Russian Orthodox archbishop
- Young Oon Kim (1914–1989), Korean theologian and missionary

== Sports ==
=== Association football ===
- Kim Bo-kyung (born 1989), South Korean football player
- Kim Byung-ji (born 1970), South Korean former football player
- Kim Do-heon (born 1982), South Korean former football player
- Kim Do-hoon (born 1970), South Korean former football player and manager
- Kim Dong-jin (born 1982), South Korean former football player
- Kim Gwang-seok (footballer) (born 1983), South Korean football player
- Kim Hak-bum (born 1960), South Korean football manager
- Kim Ho (born 1944), South Korean former football player
- Kim Ho-kon (born 1951), South Korean former football player and director
- Kim Hyeon-oh (born 2007), South Korean football player
- Kim Jin-su (born 1992), South Korean football player
- Kim Jong-boo (born 1965), South Korean former football player and manager
- Kim Jong-hun (footballer, born 1956), North Korean association football player and manager
- Kim Joo-sung (born 1966), South Korean former football player
- Kim Ju-chan (born 2004), South Korean football player
- Kim Jung-woo (footballer) (born 1982), South Korean former football player
- Kim Kum-il (born 1987), North Korean footballer
- Kim Kyong-il (footballer, born 1970), North Korean footballer
- Kim Kyong-il (footballer, born 1988), North Korean footballer
- Kim Min-jae (footballer) (born 1996), South Korean football player
- Kim Myong-gil (born 1984), North Korean footballer
- Kim Myong-won (born 1983), North Korean footballer
- Kim Nam-il (born 1977), South Korean former football player and manager
- Kim Sang-sik (born 1976), South Korean former football player and manager
- Kim Seung-gyu (born 1990), South Korean football player
- Kim Shin-wook (born 1988), South Korean football player
- Kim Sin-jin (born 2001), South Korean football player
- Kim Yong-jun (footballer) (born 1983), North Korean footballer
- Kim Young-gwon (born 1990), South Korean football player

=== Baseball ===
- Byung-hyun Kim (born 1979), Major League Baseball pitcher
- Ha-seong Kim (born 1995), Major League Baseball player
- Kim Jong-kook (baseball) (born 1973), South Korean baseball player
- Kim Min-jae (baseball) (1973–2026), South Korean baseball player and coach
- Kim Tae-gyun (baseball, born 1971), South Korean baseball player
- Kim Tae-kyun (baseball, born 1982), South Korean baseball player
- Gil Kim (born 1981), American baseball executive and coach

=== Golf ===
- Kim A-lim (born 1995), South Korean golfer
- Anthony Kim (born 1985), American golfer
- Birdie Kim (born 1981), South Korean golfer
- Christina Kim (born 1984), American golfer
- Kim Joo-mi (born 1984), South Korean golfer
- Kim Hyo-joo (born 1995), South Korean golfer
- Kim Kyung-tae (born 1986), South Korean golfer
- Mi-Hyun Kim (born 1977), South Korean golfer
- Kim Sei-young (born 1993), South Korean golfer
- Kim Si-woo (born 1995), South Korean golfer
- Tom Kim (born 2002), South Korean golfer

=== Running ===
- Kim Chang-ok (born 1975), North Korean long-distance runner
- Kim Chang-son (athlete) (born 1952), North Korean long-distance runner
- Kim Hye-gyong (born 1993), North Korean long-distance runner
- Kim Hye-song (runner) (born 1993), North Korean long-distance runner
- Kim Il-nam (born 1980), North Korean long-distance runner
- Kim Jong-chol (athlete) (born 1972), North Korean long-distance runner
- Kim Jong-su (runner) (born 1970), North Korean long-distance runner
- Kim Jung-won (born 1973), North Korean long-distance runner
- Kim Kum-ok (born 1988), North Korean long-distance runner and politician
- Kim Kwang-hyok (athlete), (born 1988), North Korean long-distance runner
- Kim Mi-gyong (born 1991), North Korean long-distance runner

=== Tennis ===
- Alex Kim (tennis) (born 1978), American tennis player
- Kim Eun-ha (born 1975), South Korean tennis player
- Kim Il-soon (born 1969), South Korean tennis player
- Kevin Kim (born 1978), American tennis player
- Kim Mi-ok (born 1978), South Korean tennis player
- Kim Na-ri (born 1990), South Korean tennis player

=== Volleyball ===
- Kim Hae-ran (born 1984), South Korean volleyball player
- Kim Hee-jin (born 1991), South Korean volleyball player
- Kim In-hyeok (1995–2022), South Korean volley player
- Kim Sa-nee (born 1981), South Korean volleyball player
- Kim Su-ji (volleyball) (born 1987), South Korean volleyball player
- Kim Yeon-koung (born 1988), South Korean volleyball player
- Kim Yo-han (volleyball) (born 1985), South Korean volleyball player

=== Other sports ===
- Chloe Kim (born 2000), American snowboarder
- Dong Hyun Kim (born 1981), South Korean retired mixed martial artist
- Dong Hyun Kim (fighter, born 1988), South Korean mixed martial artist
- Kim Duk-koo (1955-1982), South Korean professional boxer
- Kim Jae-bum (born 1985), Korean judoka
- Kim Ji-yeon (born 1988), South Korean sabre fencer
- Kim Jong-ho (archer) (born 1994), South Korean archer
- Jonathan Kim (American football) (born 2001), American football player
- Jung-Yul Kim (born 1973), Korean-Canadian former football player
- Kim Kuk-hyang (weightlifter) (born 1993), North Korean weightlifter
- Nellie Kim (born 1957), Soviet gymnast
- Kim Seok (equestrian) (born 1992), South Korean equestrian
- Kim Taek-soo (born 1970), South Korean table tennis player
- Kim Won-kwon (1918–?), South Korean long jumper and triple jumper
- Kim Young-ho (fencer) (born 1971), retired South Korean foil fencer
- Yuna Kim (born 1990), South Korean figure skater

== Writing ==
- Kim Byeong-eon (born 1951), South Korean writer
- Kim Haki (born 1958), South Korean writer and ex-political prisoner
- Kim Jae-young (author) (born 1966), South Korean writer and professor
- Kim Mi-wol (born 1977), South Korean writer
- Kim Sagwa (born 1984), South Korean writer
- Kim Sin-yong (1945–2026), South Korean writer
- Kim Wonu (born 1947), South Korean novelist
- Kim Yeong-hyeon (1955–2025), South Korean poet, novelist and publisher

== Other ==
- Kim Ho-dong (born 1954), South Korean historian
- Jaegwon Kim (1934–2019), Korean-American philosopher
- Kim Jae Kyoung (born 1982), South Korean biomedical mathematician
- Jeong-Hee Kim, South Korean educational scholar
- Jim Yong Kim (born 1959), American physician and anthropologist
- Paul Kim (academic) (born 1970), Korean-American academic
- Yu Yeon Kim (curator) (born 1956), South Korean international curator

== Fictional characters ==
- Harry Kim (Star Trek), from Star Trek: Voyager
- Kim Dong Hwan or Kim Jae Hoon, from Garou: Mark of the Wolves
- Kim Kaphwan, from the "Fatal Fury" series
- Kim Sue Il, in Kizuna Encounter
- Kim Ji-yong, in Vigilante
- Kim Jun-hee, a character in Squid Game
- Kim Young-mi, a character in Squid Game
- Kim Suho, from The Greatest Estate Developer

== See also ==
- Korean name
- Kim (surname)
