= Kathleen (given name) =

- Gender: Female

Origin
- Origin: Ireland
- Meaning: (uncertain)

Other names
- Related names: Cathleen; Caitlin; Kathy

Kathleen is a female given name, used in English- and Irish-language communities. Sometimes spelled Cathleen, it is an Anglicized form of Caitlín, the Irish form of Cateline, which was the Old French form of Catherine. It ultimately derives from the Greek name Aikaterine, the meaning of which is highly debated (see Katherine). Kathleen was the 8th most popular girls' name in Ireland in 1911, but by 1965 it had sunk to number 18.

== Literature ==
- Kathleen Raine, British poet
- Kathleen (K.A.) Tucker, Canadian author
- Kathleen Winsor, American author
- The Countess Kathleen and Various Legends and Lyrics (1892), the second poetry collection of William Butler Yeats
- Kathleen Vereecken, Belgian writer
- Kathleen O'Meara, Irish-French Catholic writer
- Kathleen (K. M.) Peyton, British author

== Military ==
- Kathleen Best, director of the Women's Royal Australian Army Corps
- Kathleen Soliah, member of the Symbionese Liberation Army

== Music ==
- Kathleen Sergerie, Québécoise pop singer
- Kathleen Battle, American soprano
- Kathleen Emperatriz DeLuna, Dominican-American R&B singer
- Kathleen Edwards, Canadian singer-songwriter
- Kathleen Ferrier, British contralto, after whom the prestigious Kathleen Ferrier Award is named
- Kathleen Hanna, American musician

== Peeresses ==
- Kathleen Pelham-Clinton, Duchess of Newcastle, dog breeder
- Kathleen Cavendish, Marchioness of Hartington, the second daughter of Joseph P. Kennedy, Sr. and a sister of U.S. President John F. Kennedy
- Kathleen Simon, Viscountess Simon, abolitionist
- Kathleen Richardson, Baroness Richardson of Calow, British peer
- Kathleen Manners, Duchess of Rutland
- Kathleen Hamilton, Duchess of Abercorn

== Politics and Law ==
- Kathleen Fleur Anderson, British politician, known as Fleur Anderson
- Kathleen Blanco, former Governor of Louisiana
- Kathleen Brown, Californian politician
- Kathleen (Kathy) Hochul, Governor of New York
- Kathleen Kane, Pennsylvania Attorney General convicted of felony perjury
- Kathleen Kennedy Townsend, former Lieutenant Governor of Maryland
- Kathleen Lynch, Irish politician
- Kathleen Martinez (TikToker), American lawyer and social media personality
- Kathleen Merrigan, Deputy Secretary of Agriculture of the United States
- Kathleen Ollerenshaw, British mathematician and politician
- Kathleen O'Meara, Irish politician
- Kathleen Paquette, American politician
- Kathleen Sebelius, United States Secretary of Health and Human Services, former Governor of Kansas
- Kathleen Wynne, Premier of Ontario

== Science ==
- Kathleen Fontaine, American physicist and ethicist
- Kathleen Hall Jamieson, American professor of communications
- Kathleen R. Johnson, American paleoclimatologist
- Kathleen Kenyon, British archaeologist
- Kathleen Lamborn, American biostatistician
- Kathleen Culhane Lathbury, was a British biochemist
- Kathleen Lonsdale, British crystallographer
- Kathleen Madden, American mathematician
- Kathleen Martínez, Dominican archaeologist, lawyer, and diplomat
- Kathleen I. Pritchard, Canadian oncologist
- Kathleen Rasmussen, American nutritionist
- Kathleen Treseder, American ecologist

== Sports ==
- Kathleen Comley, British Paralympic archer
- Kathleen Dawson (born 1997), Scottish swimmer
- Kathleen Ledecky, American Olympic swimmer
- Kathleen McGovern (born 2002), Scottish footballer
- Kathleen O'Kelly-Kennedy, Australian wheelchair basketball player
- Kathleen Smet, Belgian triathlete

== Television and film ==
- Kathleen Barr, Canadian voice actress
- Kathleen Burke, American actress
- Kathleen Byron, British actress
- Kathleen Delaney, American voice actress
- Kathleen Doyle "Kathy" Bates, American actress
- Kathleen Freeman, American character actress
- Kathleen Harrison, British character actress
- Kathleen Hepburn, Canadian screenwriter and film director
- Kathleen Herles, American voice actress
- Kathleen Kennedy, movie producer
- Kathleen de Leon Jones, retired Filipina-Australian singer and actress, original member of Hi-5
- Kathleen Kim, American puppeteer on Sesame Street
- Kathleen Madigan, American stand-up comedian
- Kathleen McDermott, Scottish actress
- Kathleen Noone, American actress
- Kathleen Quinlan, American actress
- Kathleen Robertson, Canadian actress
- Kathleen Turner, American film actress, director, and producer
- Kathleen Warner (born Davis), Trinidadian actress and radio personality, also known as "Aunty Kay"
- Kathleen York, American actress
- Kathy Griffin (born Kathleen Mary Griffin), American comedian, actress, and television personality
- Kate Walsh (born Kathleen Erin Walsh), American actress

== Other ==
- Kathleen M. Butler, project manager for the Sydney Harbour Bridge.
- Kathleen Mary Burrow, Australian physiotherapist, businesswoman, Catholic lay leader
- Kathleen Halpin, British civil servant and feminist
- Kathleen O'Toole, police commissioner of Boston, Massachusetts
- Kathleen Salmond, New Zealand artist
- Kathleen Scott, British sculptor
- Kathleen Wrasama, Ethiopian-born British community organiser
- Kathleen Zellner, American attorney

== Songs ==
- I'll Take You Home Again, Kathleen

== See also ==
- Caitlín
- Cathleen
