= Caitlin =

- Gender: Feminine

Origin
- Language: Irish
- Origin: Catherine

Other names
- Alternative spelling: Caitlan, Ceitlin, Kaitlin, Caitlyn, Kathleen, Cathleen, Kaitlyn, Kaitlyne, Catelin, Catelyn, Caitlynn, Catelynn, Caetlynn, Katelyn, Katelynn, Kaytlyn, Kaitlynn, et al.

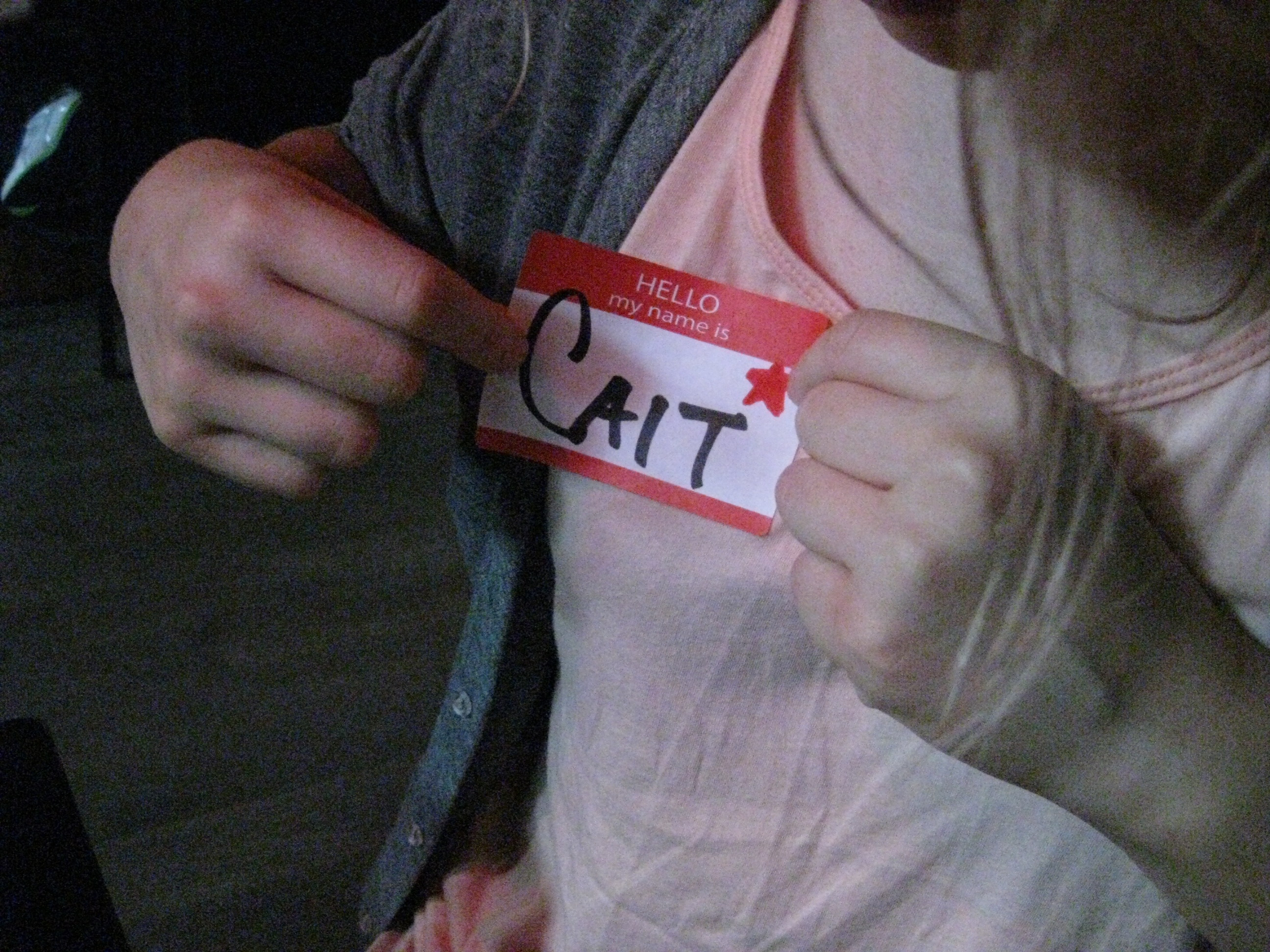

Caitlin (Irish pronunciation: [ˈkatʲlʲiːnʲ]) is a feminine given name of Irish origin. Historically, the Irish name Caitlín was anglicized as Cathleen or Kathleen. In the 1970s, however, non-Irish speakers began pronouncing the name according to English spelling rules as /ˈkeɪtlɪn/ KAYT-lin, which led to many variations in spelling such as Caitlin, Ceitlin, Catelynn, Caitlyn, Katlyn, Kaitlin, Kaitlyn, Kaytlyn, Kaitlyne, Katelyn and Katelynn.

It is the Irish version of the Old French name Cateline [katlin], which comes from Catherine, which in turn comes from the Ancient Greek Αἰκατερίνη (Aikaterine). Catherine is attributed to St. Catherine of Alexandria. Along with the many other variants of Catherine, it is generally believed to mean "pure" because of its long association with the Greek adjective καθαρός katharos (pure), though the name did not evolve from this word but from Ἑκατερός, which comes from ἑκάτερος (meaning: each of two separately).

== Usage ==
Caitlin has been a well-used name throughout the Anglosphere. In the United States, where spelling variations were more widely used, the name Caitlin peaked in use in 1988, when it was the 44th most popular name for American girls. The name was among the 1,000 most popular names for girls in the United States between 1976 and 2015. All variations of the name Caitlin declined in use in the United States in 2016, the year after the new name and gender of Caitlyn Jenner were revealed. The name Caitlin increased in popularity for American girls in 2023 and 2024 due to the popularity of WNBA player Caitlin Clark.

== Notable people ==
=== Literature ===
- Caitlin Brennan, pseudonym of Judith Tarr, American fantasy writer
- Cait Brennan, American screenwriter and performer
- Caitlin Davies, English writer
- Caitlin Flanagan, American writer and social critic
- Caitlin R. Kiernan, American dark fantasy and sci-fi author
- Caitlin Matthews, British author
- Caitlin Moran, English journalist and columnist
- Caitlin Thomas, formerly Caitlin Macnamara, British author, wife of poet and writer Dylan Thomas

=== Film and television ===
- Caitlin Carmichael, American movie actress
- Caitlin Clarke, American theatre and film actress
- Kaitlin Colombo, American comedian
- Kaitlyn Dever, American actress
- Caitlin Dulany, American actress and activist
- Caitlin FitzGerald, American actress and filmmaker
- Caitlin Glass, American voice actress
- Caitlin Halderman, Indonesian actress and singer
- Caity Lotz (Caitlin Lotz), American actress, dancer, and singer
- Kaitlin Olson, American actress and comedian
- Molly Caitlyn Quinn, American actress
- Caitlin Reilly, American actress and comedian
- Caitlin Sanchez, American voice of the animated character Dora the Explorer
- Caitlin Stasey, Australian actress
- Caitlin Wachs, American actress

=== Music ===
- Caitlin Canty, American singer/songwriter
- Caitlin Cary, American alternative country musician
- Katelyn Clampett, American singer/songwriter
- Caitlin Hanford, American and Canadian singer/songwriter and member of Quartette and The Marigolds
- Caitlin Lynn, of the country music duo Caitlin & Will
- Kaitlyn Maher, American singer from America's Got Talent
- Caitlín Maude, Irish poet, singer and language activist
- Caitlín O'Riordan, British bass guitarist (The Pogues)
- Caitlin Rose, American singer
- Katelyn Tarver (born 1989), American singer/songwriter
- Caitlyn Taylor Love, American singer/actress

=== Politicians ===
- Caitlín Brugha, née Kingston, Irish politician
- Kaitlyn Shake, American politician

=== Sports ===
- Kaitlyn (wrestler), ring name of American professional WWE wrestler Celeste Bonin
- Caitlin Bassett (netball), Australian netball player
- Caitlin Bickle, American basketball player
- Caitlin Cahow, American ice hockey player
- Caitlin Campbell, New Zealand footballer
- Caitlin Carruthers, better known as Kitty Carruthers, American figure skater
- Kaitlyn Chen, American basketball player
- Katlyn Chookagian, American MMA fighter
- Caitlin Clark, American basketball player
- Caitlin Cooper, Australian soccer player
- Caitlin Cunningham, Australian basketball player
- Kaitlyn Davis, American basketball player
- Kaitlyn Eaton, American wheelchair basketball player
- Caitlyn Edwards, Australian rules footballer
- Caitlin Foord, Australian soccer player
- Kaitlin Hawayek, American ice dancer
- Caitlyn Jenner, American track & field athlete, gold medalist at the 1976 Olympics
- Kaitlyn Lawes, Canadian curler
- Caitlin Lever, Canadian softball player and Olympian
- Caitlin Leverenz, American swimmer
- Caitlin Lowe, American softball player and Olympian
- Caitlin Mallory, American-born ice dancer
- Caitlin McClatchey, Scottish swimmer
- Caitlin Munoz, Australian soccer player
- Kaitlyn O'Donohoe (born 2001), American ice hockey player
- Katelyn Ohashi, American gymnast
- Caitlin Parker (born 1996), Australian boxer
- Caitlin Rooskrantz (born 2001), South African gymnast
- Caitlin Ryan, New Zealand canoeist
- Kaitlin Sandeno, American swimmer
- Katelyn Tuohy, American track & field athlete
- Kaitlyn Vincie, American sports presenter and journalist
- Kaitlin Willoughby (born 1995), Canadian ice hockey player

=== Others ===
- Caitlin Brunell, Miss Alabama 2015
- Kaitlan Collins, American journalist and news anchor
- Katelynn Cusanelli, American reality TV personality from The Real World: Brooklyn
- Caitlin Doughty, American mortician and YouTube personality
- Caitlin Hill, Australian YouTube personality (username "stageTheHill88")
- Caitlin Kinney, American dancer and So You Think You Can Dance (season 5) contestant
- Catelynn Lowell, American reality TV personality of the MTV shows 16 and Pregnant and Teen Mom
- Caitlin Myers, American professor of economics
- Caitlin Rivers, American epidemiologist
- Kaitlyn Siragusa or Amouranth, American social media personality

== Fictional characters ==
- Kait(lyn), in the webcomic Freakangels
- Caitlin, in the second season of the TV series Heroes
- Caitlin, from the Pokémon series; first introduced as the Lady of the Battle Castle in the Battle Frontier of Pokémon Platinum (as well as Pokémon HeartGold and SoulSilver), turning a few years later into an Unova Elite Four member in Pokémon Black and White and their sequels
- Caitlin Atkins, from Australian television series Neighbours
- Caitlin Bree, from 1994 movie Clerks
- Caitlin Cooke, from the show 6teen
- Kaitlin Cooper, from American television series The O.C.
- Caitlin Deschanel, from American television series Sunset Beach
- Caitlin Fairchild, from the comic Gen^{13}
- Caitlyn Goodwyn, a.k.a. Pop Harukaze, from the Japanese anime series Ojamajo Doremi
- Caitlyn Kiramman, the Sheriff of Piltover, a playable champion character in video game League of Legends and character in the animated series Arcane
- Caitlin O'Hara, from the Rutshire Chronicles novel series by Jilly Cooper and its adaptation Rivals
- Caitlin O'Shannessy, from the American television series Airwolf
- Caitlin Pike, from American television series JAG
- Caitlin Poythress, from the television series We Are Who We Are
- Caitlin Ramirez, from The Bold and the Beautiful
- Caitlin Ryan, from the Degrassi television series
- Caitlin Seeger, main character of the American-Canadian live action children’s drama Caitlin's Way
- Caitlin Snow (also known as Killer Frost) from the CW's The Flash and DC Comics
- Catelyn Stark, from the A Song of Ice and Fire book series and television series
- Caitlin the Streamlined Engine, a recurring character in the television series Thomas & Friends
- Caitlin Todd, from the American television series NCIS

== Other uses of the name ==
- Typhoon Caitlin (disambiguation), two tropical cyclones

== See also ==
- Cathleen
- Kathleen (disambiguation)
- Kathleen (given name)
