= Kathleen =

Kathleen may refer to:

== People ==
- Kathleen (given name)
- Kathleen (singer), Canadian pop singer
- Kathleen (musician), American singer-songwriter

== Places ==
- Kathleen, Alberta, Canada
- Kathleen, Georgia, United States
- Kathleen, Florida, United States
- Kathleen High School (Lakeland, Florida), United States
- Kathleen, Western Australia
- Kathleen Island, Tasmania, Australia
- Kathleen Lumley College, South Australia
- Mary Kathleen, Queensland, former mining settlement in Australia

== Other ==
- Kathleen (film), a 1941 American film directed by Harold S. Bucquet
- The Countess Kathleen and Various Legends and Lyrics (1892), second poetry collection of William Butler Yeats
- Kathleen Ferrier Award, competition for opera singers
- Kathleen Mitchell Award, Australian literature prize for young authors
- Plan Kathleen, plan for a German invasion of Northern Ireland sanctioned by the IRA Chief of Staff in 1940
- Tropical Storm Kathleen (disambiguation)
- "Kathleen" (song), a song by Catfish and the Bottlemen
- "Kathleen", song by Wally Lewis
- Typhoon Kathleen, hit Japan in 1947

== See also ==
- Cathleen, a given name
