= List of Toronto Defiant players =

Canadian esports team

Toronto Defiant is a Canadian esports team founded in 2018 that competes in the Overwatch League (OWL). The Defiant began playing competitive Overwatch in the 2019 season.

All rostered players during the OWL season (including the playoffs) are included, even if they did not make an appearance.

== All-time roster ==
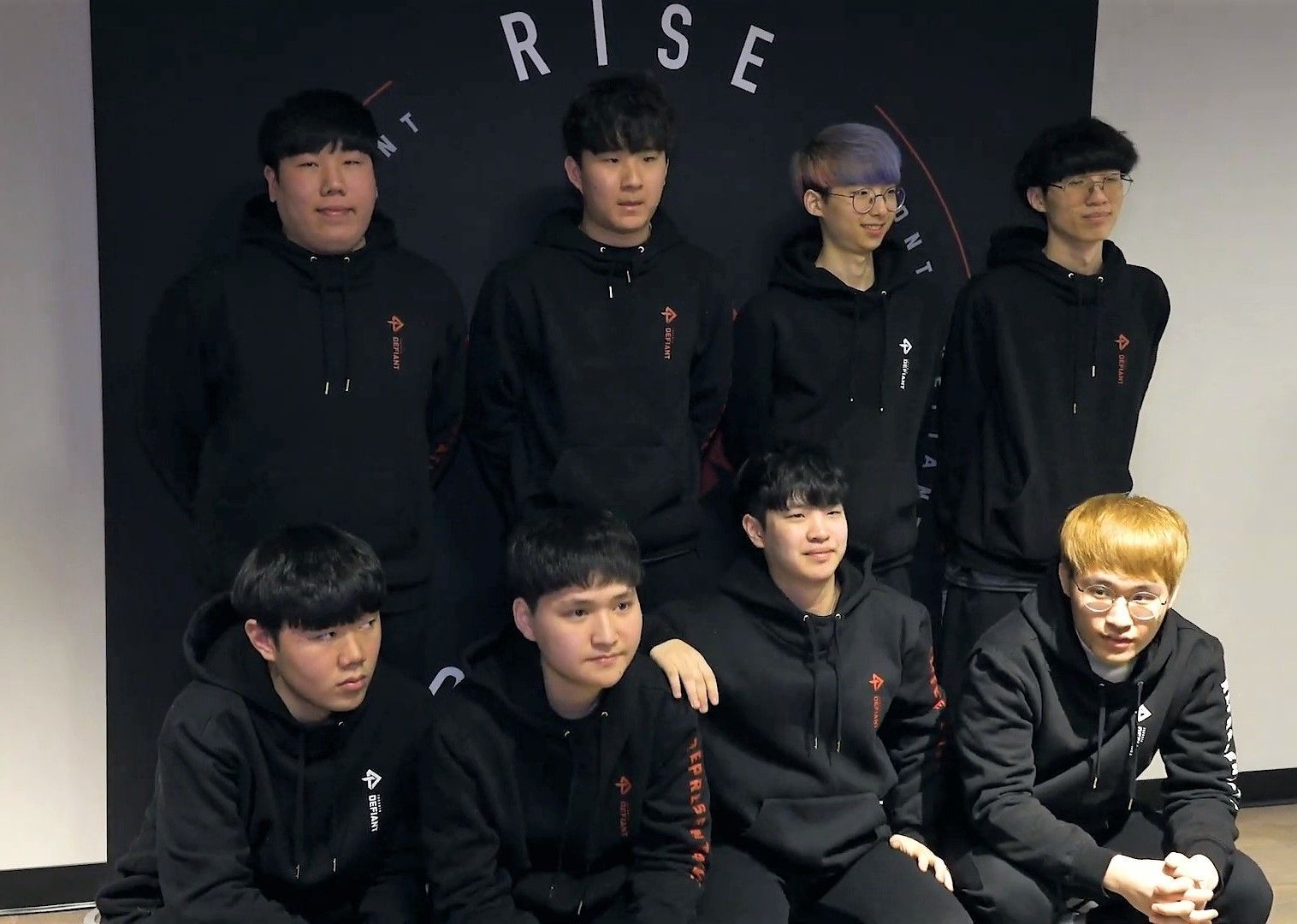
Toronto Defiant's roster at the beginning of their inaugural season.

As of December 17, 2021

Handle	Name	Role	Country	Seasons	Ref.
Agilities	Brady Girardi	Damage	Canada	2020	
Aid	Jaeyoon Go	Support	South Korea	2019	
ALTHOUGH	Hyunwook Jung	Damage	South Korea	2022–present	
ANSOONJAE	Soonjae An	Support	South Korea	2021	
Asher	Junsung Choi	Damage	South Korea	2019	
Aspire	Luka Rolovic	Damage	United States	2021	
Aztac	Jungsu Park	Support	South Korea	2021	
Beast	Adam Denton	Tank	United States	2020–2021	
envy	Kangjae Lee	Tank	South Korea	2019	
Finale	Jungwoo Lim	Support	South Korea	2022–present	
GODS	Daniel Graeser	Tank	United States	2019	
Heesu	Heesu Jeong	Damage	South Korea	2021–present	
HOTBA	Hongjoon Choi	Tank	South Korea	2022–present	
im37	Jin-ui Hong	Damage	South Korea	2019	
Ivy	Seunghyun Lee	Damage	South Korea	2019	
KariV	Youngseo Park	Support	South Korea	2020	
Kellex	Kristian Keller	Support	Denmark	2020	
Kruise	Harrison Pond	Support	United Kingdom	2020	
Lastro	Jungwon Mun	Support	South Korea	2021	
Logix	Andreas Berghmans	Damage	Belgium	2019–2021	
Mangachu	Liam Campbell	Damage	Canada	2019–2020	
Michelle	Minhyuk Choi	Tank	South Korea	2021	
MuZe	Younghun Lim	Tank	South Korea	2022–present	
Na1st	Hosung Lee	Damage	South Korea	2021	
Neko	Park Se-hyeon	Support	South Korea	2019	
Nevix	Andreas Karlsson	Tank	Sweden	2020	
numlocked	Sebastian Barton	Tank	United Kingdom	2020	
RoKy	Jooseong Park	Support	South Korea	2019–2020	
SADO	Sumin Kim	Tank	South Korea	2021	
sharyk	Normunds Faterins	Tank	Latvia	2019	
Stellar	Dohyung Lee	Damage	South Korea	2019	
Surefour	Lane Roberts	Damage	Canada	2020	
Twilight	Juseok Lee	Support	South Korea	2022–present	
Yakpung	Gyeongmu Jo	Tank	South Korea	2019	
Zykk	Thomas Hosono	Damage	France	2020	
