= 2020 Overwatch League All-Star Game =

2020 OWL All-Star Game
- Date: September 26, 2020 (A); October 3, 2020 (NA)
- Venue: Online
- Purse: $225,000

Live Broadcast
- Broadcast(s): YouTube

The 2020 Overwatch League All-Star Games refer to two Overwatch League (OWL) All-Star Games – one from each region of the 2020 season. All-Stars Asia took place on September 26, 2020, while All-Stars North America took place on October 3, 2020. Each game was the culmination of the each region's 2020 All-Star Weekend.

== Asia Region ==
=== All-Star Game ===
The 2020 All-Stars Asia Game followed a different format than that of previous years. While the first map followed the standard six-versus-six format, each team selected their opponents team composition for the second map. The third map was played using the "Tiny Overwatch" workshop mod, where each player's model began the match as a smaller version of itself than normal, but character size, damage, and healing values scaled upwards as a player put out more damage and healing.

==== Roster selection ====
The rosters for the All-Star Asia Game were selected through a voting process, although Blizzard adjusted picks to ensure that at least one player from each team was represented in the All-Star Weekend. Eighteen players in the Asia region were chosen by the fans, with voting beginning on August 23 and ending on August 28. Fans were allowed to vote for a maximum of four DPS, four tank, and four support players from each region. Twenty-four players were selected for All-Stars Asia, which included players from teams in the North America region that had gone home to Asia.

Triple A
Handle	Name	Team
Choihyobin	Choi Hyo-bin	San Francisco Shock
Ameng	Ding Menghan	Chengdu Hunters
Mano	Kim Dong-gyu	New York Excelsior
Cr0ng	Nam Ki-cheol	Guangzhou Charge
Glister	Lim Gil-seong	London Spitfire
Haksal	Kim Hyo-jong	New York Excelsior
Yaki	Kim Jun-ki	Florida Mayhem
Carpe	Lee Jae-hyeok	Philadelphia Fusion
Shu	Kim Jin-seo	Guangzhou Charge
JJoNak	Bang Sung-hyeon	New York Excelsior
Tobi	Yang Jin-mo	Seoul Dynasty
Izayaki	Kim Min-chul	Shanghai Dragons
Coach: Moon "Moon" Byung-chul (Guangzhou Charge)

Team Universe
Fearless	Lee Eui-seok	Shanghai Dragons
Void	Kang Jun-woo	Shanghai Dragons
Guxue	Xu Qiulin	Hangzhou Spark
Hanbin	Choi Han-bin	Paris Eternal
Fleta	Kim Byung-sun	Shanghai Dragons
Decay	Jang Gui-un	Washington Justice
Myunb0ng	Seo Sang-min	Boston Uprising
Profit	Park Joon-yeong	Seoul Dynasty
ANS	Lee Seon-chang	San Francisco Shock
Viol2t	Park Minki	San Francisco Shock
Alarm	Kim Kyung-bo	Philadelphia Fusion
LeeJaeGon	Lee Jae-gon	Shanghai Dragons
Handle	Name	Team
Coach: Cho "J1N" Hyo-Jin (Guangzhou Charge)

==== Game summary ====
Asia All-Star Game	September 26	Triple A	1	–	2	Team Universe	Online
	5:00 pm PDT						
		0	Blizzard World			2	
		2	Rialto			3	
		2	Lijiang Tower			1	

=== All-Star Weekend ===
In addition to the All-Star Games, the All-Stars Asia Weekend featured the Talent Takedown, Widowmaker 1v1 Tournament, Winston Skills Challenge, Genji Skills Challenge, Ana Skills Challenge, and Who is Meta? competition.

==== Talent Takedown ====
The Talent Takedown was a match played by the casters and analysts of the Overwatch League. Two teams, one from China and one South Korea, of casters and analysts faced each other in the Talent Takedown. The match consisted of two maps, where at the beginning of each map, one of the teams selected a buff from various options.

Brick Movers
Handle	Name
Vivi	Huang Chuyin
Jiuduo	He Jiaming
Peach	Wang Mengyuan
YXL	Zhang Zhihao
Roy	Liu Yuanyi
Time	Bian Yutao

Jehong and Students
Handle	Name
Yongbongtang	Hwang Kyu-hyung
Strings	Hong Hyun-sung
Ryujehong	Ryu Je-hong
Akaros	Jang Ji-su
	Sim Ji-soo
TheMarine	Kim Jung-min

Talent Takedown	September 26	Brick Movers	2	–	0	Jehong and Students	Online
		2	Lijang Tower			0	
		2	Busan			1	

==== Widowmaker 1v1 ====
The Widowmaker 1v1 tournament was a single-elimination tournament played by the eight top hitscan players from Asia. Players were only able to use the character Widowmaker, automatic firing was disabled, and only headshots applied damage to another player. The winner of each round was determined by which player got five eliminations, except for the finals, where the winner was determined by which player got nine eliminations.

Quarterfinals; Castillo
GodsB	1
Happy	5
Baconjack	0
ANS	5
Carpe	4
diem	5
Glister	5
FITS	3

Semifinals; Ecopoint: Antarctica
Happy	2
ANS	5
diem	5
Glister	3

Final; Necropolis
ANS	5
diem	9

==== Winston Skills Challenge ====
The Winston Skills Challenge was a single-elimination tournament played by the top four Winston players from the region. Each map was played on Ilios, and the winner of each round was determined by which player was able to push a neutral Wrecking Ball into the well located at the center of the map two times, aside from the final match, which a player needed to complete this task three times. Each player had unlimited Primal Rage, Winston's ultimate ability.

Semifinals
Fearless	0
Gesture	2
Mano	0
guxue	2

Final
Gesture	2
guxue	3

==== Genji Skills Challenge ====
The Genji Skills Challenge was a single-elimination tournament played by the top four Genji players from the region. Each map was played on Castillo, and the winner of each round was determined by which player got three eliminations, except for the final, where the winner was determined by which player got five eliminations.

Semifinals
Profit	3
JinMu	2
Sp9rk1e	3
Haksal	1

Final
Profit	4
Sp9rk1e	5

==== Ana Skills Challenge ====
The Ana Skills Challenge was series of deathmatches played by the top nine Ana players from the region. The first map was played on Black Forest, while the second, and final, map was played on Necropolis. A round ended when a player reached 20 eliminations or the five-minute time limit had been reached. The top four players from the first round advanced to the final round.

Place	Player	First round	Final round
1	JJoNak	20	18
2	Highly	16	16
3	Izayaki	16	14
3	Viol2t	19	14
5	Shu	15	–
6	Alarm	14	–
7	BeBe	13	–
8	Molly	10	–
9	Creative	8	–

==== Who is Meta? ====
The Who is Meta? match was a deathmatch played by the eight players in the region with the most "Fleta Deadlifts" in the season (a player achieves a Fleta Deadlift if they claim over half of their team's final blows in a match). Each player began the match as the character McCree. After a player obtained a kill, they were automatically changed to another character. The first player to get kills on all 22 characters won the match.

Place	Player	Elim
1	Rascal	22
2	Haksal	21
2	leave	21
4	Glister	20
4	birdring	20
6	ANS	19
7	Sp9rk1e	18
8	Fleta	15

== North America Region ==
=== All-Star Game ===
The North America All-Star Game followed the same ruleset as its Asia counterpart. While the first map followed the standard six-versus-six format, each team selected their opponents team composition for the second map. The third map was played using the "Tiny Overwatch" workshop mod, where each player's model began the match as a smaller version of itself than normal, but character size, damage, and healing values scaled upwards as a player put out more damage and healing.

==== Roster selection ====
The roster for the All-Star North America Game were selected through a voting process, although Blizzard adjusted picks to ensure that at least one player from each team was represented in the All-Star Weekend. Eighteen players in the North America region were chosen by the fans, with voting beginning on August 23 and ending on August 28. Fans were allowed to vote for a maximum of four DPS, four tank, and four support players from each region. Twenty players were selected for All-Stars North America. The players were then drafted into two teams by the coaches of the All-Star Game.

Team D.Va
Handle	Name	Team
SPACE	Indy Halpern	Los Angeles Gladiators
BenBest	Benjamin Dieulafait	Paris Eternal
McGravy	Caleb McGarvey	Los Angeles Valiant
Hydration	João Pedro Goes Telles	Houston Outlaws
sHockWave	Niclas Jensen	Vancouver Titans
KSP	Kai Collins	Los Angeles Valiant
Agilities	Brady Girardi	Toronto Defiant
KariV	Park Young-seo	Toronto Defiant
moth	Grant Espe	San Francisco Shock
FDGoD	Brice Monsçavoir	Paris Eternal
Coach: Kim "Kuki" Dae-kuk (Florida Mayhem)

Team Reinhardt
Handle	Name	Team
Super	Matthew DeLisi	San Francisco Shock
Nevix	Andreas Karlsson	Toronto Defiant
Poko	Gael Gouzerch	Philadelphia Fusion
SoOn	Terence Tarlier	Paris Eternal
Danteh	Dante Cruz	Houston Outlaws
NiCOgdh	Nicolas Moret	Paris Eternal
Dogman	Dusttin Bowerman	Atlanta Reign
Crimzo	William Hernandez	Dallas Fuel
Jecse	Lee Seung-soo	Houston Outlaws
FunnyAstro	Daniel Hathaway	Philadelphia Fusion
Coach: Kim "KDG" Dong-Gun (Philadelphia Fusion)

==== Game summary ====
North America All-Star Game	October 3	Team D.Va	1	–	2	Team Reinhardt	Online
		3	Blizzard World			4	
		3	Rialto			2	
		1	Lijiang Tower			2	

=== All-Star Weekend ===
In addition to the All-Star Games, each region's All-Star Weekend featured a Talent Takedown and a Widowmaker 1v1 Tournament.

==== Talent Takedown ====
The Talent Takedown was a match played by the casters and analysts of the Overwatch League. Two teams, both from North America, of casters and analysts faced each other in the Talent Takedown. The match consisted of three maps. On the first map, each team must have had Genji and Mercy on their team, on the second map, they must have used the GOATS composition, and on the third map, each team must have had Widowmaker and Tracer on their team.

Team Custa
Handle	Name
ZP	Andrew Rush
Frankie	Frankie Ward
Reinforce	Jonathan Larsson
Mr X	Matt Morello
Hexagrams	Robert Kirkbride
Custa	Scott Kennedy

Team Jake
Handle	Name
Bren	Brennon Hook
Jaws	Jack Wright
Jake	Jake Lyon
Sideshow	Josh Wilkinson
Uber	Mitch Leslie
Soe	Soe Gschwind

North America Talent Takedown	October 3	Team Custa	1	–	2	Team Jake	Online
		2	King's Row			3	
		2	Rialto			3	
		3	Lijiang Tower			0	

==== Widowmaker 1v1 ====
The Widowmaker 1v1 tournament was a single-elimination tournament played by the eight top hitscan players from the region. Players were only able to use the character Widowmaker, automatic firing was disabled, and only headshots applied damage to another player. The winner of each round was determined by which player got five eliminations, except for the final match, where the winner was determined by which player got nine eliminations.

Quarterfinals; Castillo
sHockWave	2
LiNkzr	5
Dalton	5
Colourhex	3
KSP	1
SoOn	5
Logix	2
Onigod	5

Semifinals; Ecopoint: Antarctica
LiNkzr	5
Dalton	3
SoOn	5
Onigod	0

Final; Necropolis
LiNkzr	9
SoOn	8

== Prize Pool ==
Players competing in the All-Star Weekend competed for a total prize pool of US$225,000, with the payout division detailed below.

Event	Asia		North America	
Event	Team/Player	Bonus	Team/Player	Bonus
All-Star Game winner	Team Universe	$90,000	Team Reinhardt	$75,000
Widowmaker 1v1 winner	diem	$15,000	LiNkzr	$15,000
Widowmaker 1v1 runner-up	ANS	$7,500	SoOn	$7,500
Winston Skill Challenge winner	guxue	$4,000	–	–
Genji Skill Challenge winner	Sp9rkle	$4,000	–	–
Ana Skill Challenge winner	JJoNak	$4,000	–	–
Who is Meta? winner	Rascal	$3,000	–	–

== Broadcasting ==
The entire All-Star Weekend was broadcast live on YouTube and Overwatch League website.
