= Culhane =

Culhane is a surname. Notable people with the surname include:

- Jeremy Culhane (born 1992), American comedian and actor
- Jim Culhane (born 1965), Canadian ice hockey player
- John Culhane (1900–1979), Australian footballer
- Kathleen Culhane Lathbury (1900–1993), British biochemist
- Kieran Culhane, Irish footballer for Ballylongford GAA
- Leonard Culhane (born 1937), British astronomer
- Noreen Culhane (born 1950), American businesswoman
- Shamus Culhane (1908–1996), American animator, film director and producer
- Simon Culhane (born 1968), New Zealand rugby player
