= List of Vancouver Titans players =

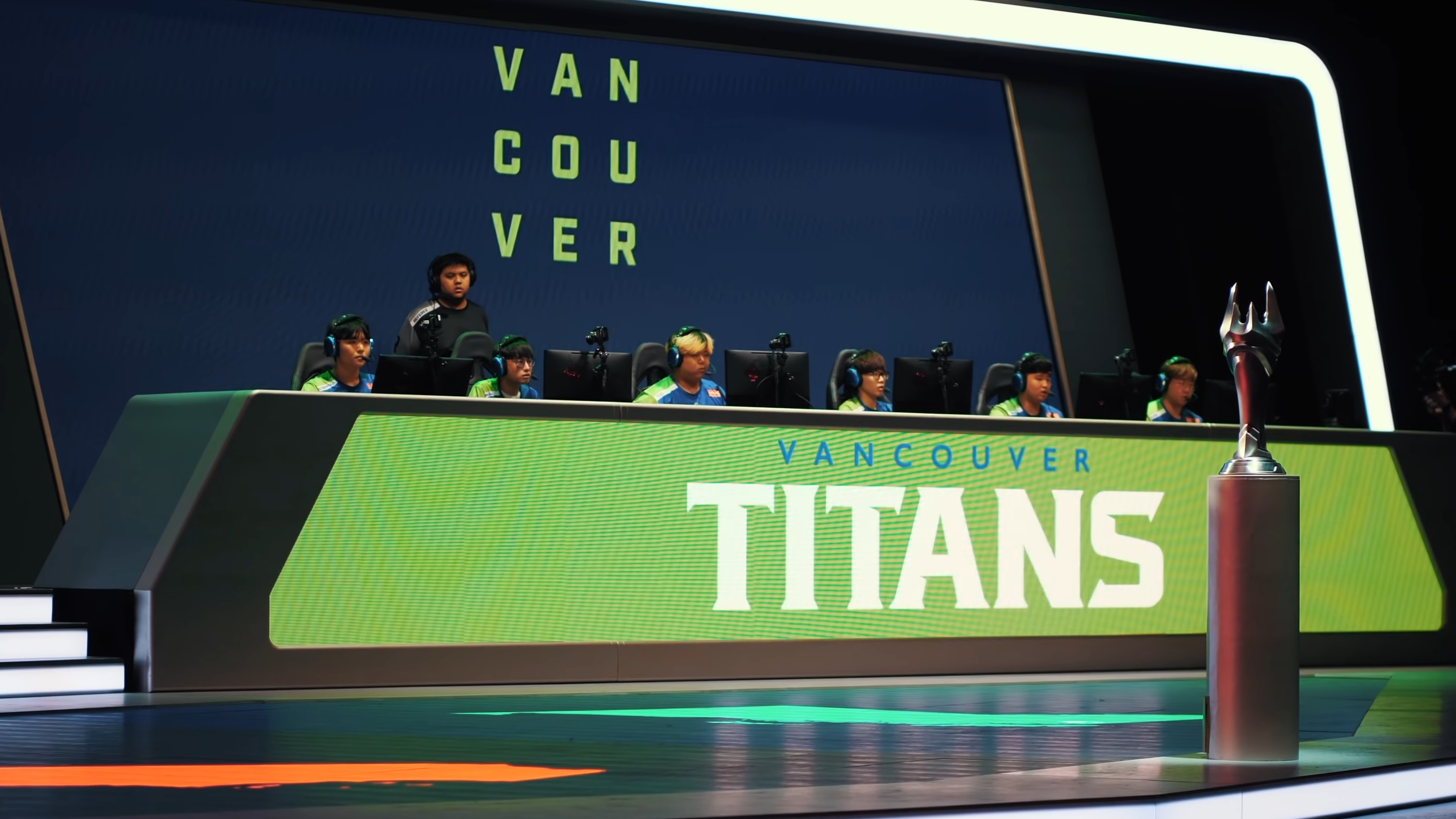
Vancouver Titans players during the 2019 Grand Finals on September 29, 2019.

The Vancouver Titans are a Canadian esports team founded in 2018 that compete in the Overwatch League (OWL). The Titans began playing competitive Overwatch in the 2019 season.

All rostered players during the OWL season (including the playoffs) are included, even if they did not make an appearance.

== All-time roster ==
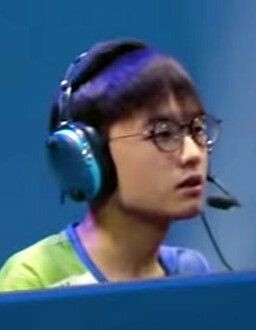
Kim "Haksal" Hyo-jong was named the 2019 Rookie of the Year.

As of September 30, 2022

Handle	Name	Role	Country	Seasons	Ref.
Aspire	Luka Rolovic	Damage	United States	2022–present	
Aztac	Jeongsu Park	Support	South Korea	2022–present	
Bumper	Sangbeom Park	Tank	South Korea	2019	
CarCar	Carson First	Support	United States	2020	
ChangSik	Changsik Moon	Tank	South Korea	2021	
Dalton	Dalton Bennyhoff	Damage	United States	2020–2021	
False	Nick Wiseman	Tank	Canada	2022–present	
Fire	Anthony King	Support	United States	2021	
Fissure	Chanhyeong Baek	Tank	South Korea	2020	
frdwnr	Nathan Goebel	Tank	United States	2021	
k1ng	Rene Rangel	Damage	United States	2022–present	
Haksal	Hyojong Kim	Damage	South Korea	2019–2020	
Hooreg	Dongeun Lee	Damage	South Korea	2019	
JJANU	Hyeonwoo Choi	Tank	South Korea	2019–2020	
KSAA	Alhumaidi Alruwaili	Tank	Saudi Arabia	2020	
LiNkzr	Jiri Masalin	Damage	Finland	2021	
Masaa	Petja Kantanen	Support	Finland	2022–present	
MirroR	Gia Huy Trinh	Tank, Damage	Vietnam	2022–present	
Rapel	Junggeun Kim	Support	South Korea	2019	
Roolf	Randal Stark	Support	Canada	2020–2021	
ryujehong	Jehong Ryu	Support	South Korea	2020	
Seicoe	Maximillian Otter	Damage	Austria	2022	
SeoMinSoo	Minsoo Seo	Flex	South Korea	2019–2020	
sHockWave	Niclas Jensen	Damage	Denmark	2020, 2022	
ShRedLock	Abtin Shirvani	Tank	Canada	2020–2021	
SLIME	Sungjun Kim	Support	South Korea	2019–2020	
Stitch	Chunghui Lee	Damage	South Korea	2019–2020	
Teru	Minki Kim	Damage	South Korea	2021	
TiZi	Janghyeon Hwang	Tank	South Korea	2019	
Tsuna	Samir Ikram	Damage	France	2020	
Twilight	Juseok Lee	Support	South Korea	2019–2020	
