= List of Philadelphia Fusion players =

Philadelphia Fusion is an American esports team founded in 2017 that competes in the Overwatch League (OWL). The Fusion began playing competitive Overwatch in the 2018 season.

All rostered players during the OWL season (including the playoffs) are included, even if they did not make an appearance.

== All-time roster ==
As of December 16, 2021

Handle	Name	Role	Country	Seasons	Ref.
Alarm	Kim Kyeong-bo	Support	South Korea	2020–2021	
Boombox	Isaac Charles	Support	United Kingdom	2018–2020	
Carpe	Jaehyeok Lee	Damage	South Korea	2018–present	
ChipSa	Philip Graham	Damage	United Kingdom	2020	
DayFly	Jeonghwan Park	Support	South Korea	2018	
Elk	Elijah Gallagher	Support	United States	2019	
Eqo	Josue Corona	Damage	Israel	2018–2021	
fragi	Joona Laine	Tank	Finland	2018–2019	
FunnyAstro	Daniel Hathaway	Support	Great Britain	2020–2021	
Fury	Junho Kim	Tank	South Korea	2020	
Heesu	Heesu Jeong	Damage	South Korea	2020	
HOTBA	Hongjun Choi	Tank	South Korea	2018, 2021	
Ivy	Lee Seung-hyun	Damage	South Korea	2020	
Joemeister	Joe Gramano	Support	Canada	2018	
Kyb	Finley Adisi	Damage	United Kingdom	2019	
Mano	Donggyu Kim	Tank	South Korea	2021	
MN3	Jaehee Yoon	Damage	South Korea	2022–present	
Neptuno	Alberto González Molinillo	Support	Spain	2018–2019	
Poko	Gael Gouzerch	Tank	France	2018–2021	
Rascal	Dongjun Kim	Damage	South Korea	2021	
SADO	Sumin Kim	Tank	South Korea	2018–2020	
ShaDowBurn	George Gushcha	Damage	Russia	2018	
sHockWave	Niclas Jensen	Damage	Denmark	2021	
snillo	Simon Ekström	Damage	Sweden	2018–2019	
tobi	Jinmo Yang	Support	South Korea	2021	
ZEST	Hyunwoo Kim	Damage	South Korea	2022–present	
