= Montreal Rebellion =

- Founded: 2019
- Disbanded: 2020
- League: Overwatch Contenders
- Division: Atlantic
- Region: North America East (2019); North America West (2019); North America (2020)
- Team history: Montreal Rebellion; 2019–2020
- Based in: Montreal, Quebec
- Colours: Red, white, black
- Owner: OverActive Media
- Affiliation: Toronto Defiant

Montreal Rebellion was a Canadian esports team for the video game Overwatch competing in Overwatch Contenders (OWC) and an academy team for the Toronto Defiant of the Overwatch League (OWL). The team was owned by OverActive Media, based in Montreal, Quebec, and played in the North America region of OWC.

== Franchise history ==
On February 14, 2019, OverActive Media, in partnership with esports team Mirage Sport Électronique, formally announced Toronto Defiant's academy team as "Montreal Rebellion". They began in Overwatch Contenders North America East and revealed their 2019 Season 1 roster, led by head coach Chris "Dream" Myrick.

In their first season of play, Rebellion finished 2–5 in the regular season and claimed the final playoff spot by finishing in sixth place. They defeated third-seeded Second Wind 3–1 in the quarterfinals before losing to two-seed and eventual champions Fusion University (Philadelphia Fusion's academy team). After the season, the team mutually parted ways with head coach Dream and announced May "Optidox" Sims, who had led Angry Titans to the 2019 Season 1 EU championship, as the new head coach.

Prior to 2019 Season 2, Montreal Rebellion was moved to the North America West region. Part way through the season, Optidox left the team to become an assistant coach (and subsequently interim co-head coach) for the Toronto Defiant. Jesse "Jsr" Rangi was subsequently named head coach and finished out the season with the Rebellion. They finished in fifth place with a 4–3 record, though they were defeated by Second Wind, 3–1, in a quarterfinals rematch from the previous season.

After two weeks of the 2020 season, Rebellion quietly disbanded without an official announcement, reportedly due to budget cuts amidst the COVID-19 pandemic.

== Seasons overview ==
Year	Season	Region	OWC regular season				Regional playoffs	Interregional events
Year	Season	Region	Finish	Wins	Losses	Win %	Regional playoffs	Interregional events
2019	1	North America East	6th	2	5	.286	Semifinals	Did not qualify
2019	2	North America West	5th	4	3	.571	Quarterfinals	Did not qualify
2020	1	North America	DNF	2	2	.500		
Regular season record				8	10	.444		
Playoff record				1	2	.333		

== Final roster ==
Montreal Rebellion roster
Players
Coaches

Role	Handle	Name	Nationality
Damage	Leaf	Loison, Lucas	France
Damage	Mangachu (TW)	Campbell, Liam	Canada
Damage	sHockWave	Jensen, Niclas	Denmark
Tank	numlocked	Barton, Seb	United Kingdom
Tank	Shuh	Pfleger, Alban	France
Support	dridro	Szanto, Arthur	France
Support	RoKy (TW)	Park Joo-seong	South Korea

Head coach

- Vacant

Legend:
- (I) Inactive
- (S) Suspended
- (2W) Two-way player
- Substitute
- (injured) Injury / Illness

Latest roster transaction: March 19, 2020.

== OWL buyouts and promotions ==
All Overwatch Contenders players are eligible to be promoted by their affiliated Overwatch League team or signed to any other Overwatch League during specified non-blackout periods.

=== 2019 ===
- Tanks Daniel "Gods" Graeser and Normunds "sharyk" Faterins were promoted to Toronto Defiant on May 21.
- DPS Andreas "Logix" Berghmans was promoted to Toronto Defiant on June 28.
- Tank Eoghan "Smex" O'Neill was signed to the Paris Eternal on December 3.
