= Cathleen =

- Gender: Female
- Language: English

Origin
- Language: Irish
- Origin: Caitlín

Other names
- Cognate: Kathleen

Cathleen is a feminine given name in the English language. It is a variant form of Kathleen. Notable people with the name include:

- Cathleen Chaffee, American curator, art historian, writer
- Cathleen Falsani, American journalist and writer
- Cathleen Galgiani, American politician
- Cathleen Miller, American writer and journalist
- Cathleen Nesbitt, English actress
- Cathleen Rund, German Olympic swimmer
- Cathleen Schine, American author
- Cathleen Synge Morawetz, Canadian mathematician
- Lady Cathleen Hudson, younger daughter of John Granville Cornwallis Eliot, 6th Earl of St Germans

== See also ==
- Kathleen (disambiguation)
