= Scott Cunningham (economist) =

American economist

- Born: Scranton, Pennsylvania
- Education: University of Tennessee; University of Georgia
- Children: 3
- Scientific career
- Fields: Economics
- Workplaces: Baylor University
- Website: Personal website

Scott Cunningham is an American economist who is the professor of economics at Baylor University, Research Fellow of the Baylor Collaborative on Hunger and Poverty, and Research Affiliate of the Computational Justice Lab.

== Career ==
He is known for his work in the field of applied microeconomics, particularly in relation to the economics of sex work, substance use, and public policy. He also is widely recognized for popularizing advances in non-experimental impact evaluation methods (causal inference) and making it more accessible to practitioners. He wrote the Yale University Press textbook Causal Inference: The Mixtape.

== Education ==
He holds a B.A. in literature from the University of Tennessee and a PhD in Economics from the University of Georgia.

== Mixtape ==
One of Cunningham's most notable projects is Causal Inference: The Mixtape, which serves as both a textbook and a platform for disseminating complex econometric concepts in a more digestible format. The content focuses on causal inference, a set of statistical and econometric techniques designed to isolate and measure causal effects, even in situations in which a randomized experiment is not possible. Cunningham's textbook is intended to bridge the gap between high-level theory and research and practical application. Cunningham regularly hosts workshops on causal inference for departments, industry, and government agencies.

Cunningham's project extends to a newsletter where he publishes a variety of primers and commentaries. This also includes his Mixtape with Scott podcast in which he interviews economists about their lives, careers, and work. His stated hope is that in the limit, a collective oral history of the last 50 years of the economics profession will emerge.

== Research ==
Cunningham's research examines prostitution markets, foster care, abortion, mental health, and drug policy.

He has found that the accidental legalization of prostitution in Rhode Island between 2003 and 2009 increased the size of that market, but reduced sexual violence against women and the incidence of sexually transmitted diseases. He has also found the sudden closure of abortion clinics in Texas in 2013 resulted in a decline in the number of abortions linked to an increase in distances to open clinics.

=== Selected works ===
- Cunningham, Scott. Causal Inference: The Mixtape. Yale University Press, 2021.
- Cunningham, Scott, and Todd D. Kendall. "Prostitution 2.0: The changing face of sex work." Journal of Urban Economics 69, no. 3 (2011): 273–287.
- Cunningham, Scott, and Manisha Shah. "Decriminalizing indoor prostitution: Implications for sexual violence and public health." The Review of Economic Studies 85, no. 3 (2018): 1683–1715.
- Cunningham, Scott, Benjamin Engelstätter, and Michael R. Ward. "Violent video games and violent crime." Southern Economic Journal 82, no. 4 (2016): 1247–1265.
- Cunningham, Scott, and Keith Finlay. "Parental substance use and foster care: Evidence from two methamphetamine supply shocks." Economic Inquiry 51, no. 1 (2013): 764–782.
- Lindo, Jason M., Caitlin Knowles Myers, Andrea Schlosser, and Scott Cunningham. "How far is too far? New evidence on abortion clinic closures, access, and abortions." Journal of Human resources 55, no. 4 (2020): 1137–1160.
