= Kathleen Rasmussen =

American nutritionist

- Occupation: Nutritionist
- Awards: SUNY Chancellor’s Awards for Excellence

Academic background
- Education: A.B., Molecular Biology, 1970, Brown University; Sc.M., Nutrition, 1975, Sc.D., 1978, Harvard University

Academic work
- Institutions: Cornell University

Kathleen Maher Rasmussen is an American nutritionist. She is the Nancy Schlegel Meinig Professor of Maternal and Child Nutrition in the Division of Nutritional Sciences at Cornell University. Rasmussen studies the relationship between maternal nutrition and short- and long-term health outcomes for women and their children.

== Early life and education ==
Rasmussen completed her Bachelor of Arts degree in molecular biology at Brown University before enrolling at Harvard University for her Master of Science and Doctor of Science degrees.

== Career ==
Following her doctorate degree, Rasmussen joined Cornell University in 1978 as a postdoctoral trainee and was shortly thereafter promoted to professor. In 1987, she was appointed program director for Cornell's Training in Maternal and Child Nutrition program. During her early tenure at the institution, Rasmussen focused on how maternal obesity relates to breastfeeding performance and infant growth. In the early 1990s, she co-authored a study proving the positive effects vitamin A had supplementation had on nursing mothers in Indonesia. As a result of this work and others, the World Health Organization changed its policies regarding vitamin A supplementation for nursing mothers. She also helped to develop the Dannon Nutrition Leadership Institute in 1998 and served as its principal faculty member until 2017.

In the later 1990s, Rasmussen published a study proving a link between overweight and obese women and less successful breast-feeding. Her research team reported that these mothers were 2.5 to 3.6 times less successful in starting breastfeeding than mothers who were not overweight. Following this, Rasmussen oversaw another study and reported that women who observed the Institute of Medicine's (IOM) guidelines during pregnancy were more likely to be successful at breast-feeding than mothers who gained over 24 to 35 pounds. Rasmussen was recognized for her work with the inaugural 2006 Excellence in Nutrition Education Award from the American Society for Nutrition. She was also elected president of the International Society for Research on Human Milk and Lactation (ISRHML) and as president of American Society for Nutritional Sciences.

As a result of her studies on how maternal obesity relates to breastfeeding performance, Rasmussen oversaw a committee to review and update the IOM's recommendations for weight gain during pregnancy. During this time, she was the recipient of the 2009 Dannon Institute Mentorship Award for outstanding mentorship in the development of successful nutritional science investigators. Rasmussen also received the 2012 March of Dimes Agnes Higgins Award in Maternal-Fetal Nutrition and the ISRHML's Macy-György Award for "original scientific contributions to the study of human milk and lactation." In 2017, she was recognized by the American Society for Nutrition with the Conrad A. Elvehjem Award for Public Service in Nutrition.

In 2020, Rasmussen was selected for the 2019–20 SUNY Chancellor’s Awards for Excellence as someone who had "demonstrated a commitment to intellectual vibrancy, advancing the boundaries of knowledge, providing the highest quality of instruction and serving the public good."
