= Kim Byeong-eon =

South Korean writer (born 1951)

- Born: 1951 (age 74–75)
- Writing career
- Language: Korean

Korean name
- Hangul: 김병언
- RR: Gim Byeongeon
- MR: Kim Pyŏngŏn

Kim Byeong-eon (Korean: 김병언; born 1951) is a South Korean writer.

== Life ==
Born in Daegu, in 1951, Kim Byeong-eon graduated from Seoul National University's Department of Linguistics. He spent the next dozen years working at 5 different workplaces including a trading company, hotel, construction firm, and transportation company. For Kim, staying at any one job for 2 years was a chore, so every time he changed jobs, he also had to change the industry he worked in to find satisfaction. While employed at a construction company, he worked in the Middle Eastern desert, an experience he used as the background for his first short story collection, 3 Sad Stories about Dogs. This experience was also reflected in his story "Offering to the Yellow Sand" (included in the collection South Pacific) as well as in his other works.

He made his debut in 1992 with "Picking Up Fallen Ears of Rice" which was published in the literary journal Culture & Society. He subsequently quit his job and devoted himself to writing full-time. With diverse life experiences as his foundation, he pursued an orthodox realist style, unswayed by current literary trends. His works have been acclaimed for their consistent and unswerving sincerity.

== Work ==
Kim's works can be classified as realism, with colorful and careful portrayals of diverse communal scenes from everyday life. Covering the Korean War in the 1950s to the present-day 21st century, from the provinces to the deserts of the Middle East, Kim's works contain diverse stories including those of pet dogs treated like brothers until violently killed by their young masters and tales of the world's last chivalrous souls. His novels portray diverse eras, places, and characters, but his talent is particularly suited to the task of captivating readers with his delicate portrayals of the marginalized and the queer. His writing is well known for its solid, smooth prose, elaborate and well-crafted plots, vivid descriptions, and open-endedness that encourages readers to draw their own conclusions.

== Awards ==
- Dong-in Literature Prize (Finalist, 2007)
- Han Mu-sook Literature Prize (2008)

== Works in Korean (Partial) ==
- Picking Up Fallen Ears of Rice (1992)
- 3 Sad Stories about Dogs (1995)
- Fool's Love (1997)
- The Carpenter's Knife (1999)
- South Pacific (2007)
