= Dabit =

South Korean-American singer and songwriter

- Born: Ohio, United States
- Education: Berklee – Music
- Occupations: Singer, songwriter, actor
- Years active: 2013–present
- Agent: KoffeeDream Management,

Korean name
- Hangul: 김정욱
- RR: Gim Jeonguk
- MR: Kim Chŏnguk

Kim Jeong-wook; Hangul: 김정욱, better known by his stage name Dabit (Hangul: 다빗), is a South Korean-American solo singer-songwriter. He debuted on his birthday, December 5, 2013. His fanclub name is called "Dalbit" (Hangul: 달빛) which means "moonlight". He was born and raised in the state of Ohio.

== Biography ==
=== Childhood ===
Dabit was born and raised in the state of Ohio, USA, the youngest of three brothers. He has been passionate about music since childhood and performed song covers from a young age. He started Berklee College of Music when he received a renewable scholarship. After two years of attending Berklee he decided to go to Korea to pursue his dream of becoming a singer-songwriter.

=== Pre-Debut ===
Dabit auditioned at different companies in Korea, where he was able to become a trainee at Choeun Entertainment. He trained at Choeun Entertainment for a year to debut with the boy group 24K. Not long after the debut of 24K, Dabit realized that idol music was not for him. He decided to leave the company and set up a joint company with his friend KoffeeDream Management (KDM) to help him to start his journey as a solo singer-songwriter.

== Career ==
=== Debut ===
Dabit released his first digital single "Whoo Whoo Whoo" on his birthday (December 5, 2013), making it a special moment for both him and his fans. Both songs in his first digital album, "Whoo Whoo Whoo" and "When the Wind Blows", are written and composed by Dabit himself. The song introduced Dabit's style of music, which can be best described as k-pop with a light jazz/swing influence.

=== Radio career ===
Dabit has been active in Korean broadcast media since 2013, appearing regularly as a weekly guest on multiple programs across Arirang Radio and Arirang TV. From 2018 to 2020, he served as a co-host of K-pop Connection, where he brought his perspective as an artist to international K-pop lovers. His long-running presence on air has made him a familiar trusted voice in broadcast media.

=== Acting career ===
Dabit is currently undertaking acting lessons to pursue a career in acting, in addition to his singing. He made his first cameo appearance on SBS's drama called "Endless Love" and hopes to work towards bigger roles in the future.

=== Music career ===
As of 2015, Dabit has released two singles, including his debut. He became the first Korean artist to perform in Tunisia in 2014, and had a solo tour over the end of 2015 to 2016.

Coming out

In 2023, Dabit publicly came out on the Wavve original gay dating reality show "His Man 2" (남의연애 2), appearing under his Korean name, 정욱. The show's popularity brought new light to his journey, which he has continued through music and content that reflect his life as an openly queer artist.

== Discography ==
=== Korean discography ===
Year	Title	Album details
2013	Whoo Whoo Whoo	Digital Single
2014	ZONE OUT 멍	Digital Single
2015	UP & DOWN	Digital Single
2018	GIMME MAGIC	Digital Single
2020	DON'T WANNA BE	Digital Single
2023	PANIC	Digital Single
2024	HABIT	Digital Single
2025	WORTH IT	Digital Single

== Filmography ==
=== Television drama ===
Year	Title	Role
2014	Endless Love	Cameo (Band Member)
2015	My Unfortunate Boyfriend	Cameo (Antique Shop Attendant)

=== Television show ===
Year	Title	Role
2023	His Man Season 2	Contestant

=== Radio show ===
Year	Title	Role
2014–2018	Arirang HOT BEAT – Question Mark	Co-DJ with Bigflo's Lex
December 15, 2016	BARANGAYLS 97.1FM – Philippines	Guest
April 4, 2018	One Fine Day with Lena Park – KBS Radio	Co-Dj
2018–present	K-pop Connection – KBS Radio	Co-Dj

=== Musical Theater ===
Title	Role
Guys and Dolls	Lead role (Sky Masterson)

=== OST ===
Title	Drama
꿈이라면 (If It's A Dream)	아버님 제가 모실게요 (Father, I'll Take Care of You)
Say it Back	남의연애3 (His Man 3)
