= List of storms named Kathleen =

The name Kathleen has been used for six tropical cyclones worldwide.

In the Eastern Pacific Ocean:

- Tropical Storm Kathleen (1961) – not a threat to land.
- Tropical Storm Kathleen (1968) – not a threat to land.
- Tropical Storm Kathleen (1972) – came close to land.
- Hurricane Kathleen (1976) – Category 1 hurricane, made landfall in Baja as a tropical storm, moved into California and Arizona

In the Western Pacific Ocean:

- Typhoon Kathleen (T4709) – Affected Kantō, Japan

In the Southwest Indian Ocean:

- Cyclone Kathleen (1965)

In Europe:

- Storm Kathleen (2024)
