= Kim Geum-hyok =

North Korean civil servant

- Born: Kim Geum-hyok; 1991 (age 34–35); Pyongyang, North Korea
- Other name: Kim Gum-hyok
- Education: Kim Il Sung University
- Alma mater: Peking University
- Occupations: Policy adviser; Civil servant; Human rights activist
- Years active: 2023 - present
- Children: 1

Kim Geum-hyok (Korean: 김금혁; born 1991), also known as Gumhyok Kim, is a North Korean defector, human rights advocate, and policy adviser who currently serves as a Grade 5 civil servant in the South Korean government. He is notable for being the first defector to hold such a high-ranking position within a central government ministry and for his testimony before the United Nations Security Council regarding North Korean human rights.

== Early life and education ==
Kim was born into the elite class in Pyongyang, North Korea. As a student at Kim Il Sung University, he was groomed for a career in diplomacy. In 2010, at age 19, he was sent to study abroad at Peking University in Beijing, China.

While in Beijing, Kim gained access to the uncensored internet, which led him to discover details about North Korea's history, the Great Famine, and the existence of political prison camps. Feeling a "deep sense of betrayal," he formed a small underground study group with other North Korean students to discuss democracy and human rights.

== Defection ==
In late 2011, the activities of Kim's study group were discovered by North Korean authorities. Fearing for his life, he fled China and reached South Korea in 2012. He has often expressed survivor's guilt, noting that he was the only member of his group to reach freedom.

== Career ==
=== Government service ===
Following his defection, Kim became a prominent voice for the "MZ generation" of North Korean defectors—younger individuals who prioritize integration into mainstream South Korean society. In 2023, he was appointed as a policy adviser to the Minister of Patriots and Veterans Affairs. His appointment was significant as it marked the first time a defector was hired as a Grade 5 civil servant in a central ministry.

He also serves as a policy adviser for this committee, contributing to long-term unification strategies for the Korean Peninsula.

== Personal life ==
Kim resides in Seoul and is married to a South Korean woman. He holds a degree in political science and has expressed ambitions to pursue advanced graduate studies in international affairs at U.S. institutions such as Johns Hopkins University or Columbia University.

== Advocacy and Media ==
Kim is a vocal advocate for the rights of North Koreans. On June 12, 2024, Kim testified before the United Nations Security Council during a session on North Korean human rights. He urged the council to prioritize human rights equally with nuclear security concerns. Kim is scheduled to speak at the ICAS Winter Symposium Veritas 2025 on February 13, 2025, discussing the current state of the Koreas.

He manages the YouTube channel "Seoul Pyongyang Couple" with his South Korean wife, as well as a solo channel titled "Kim Gum-hyok's Nanse Ilgi" (Turbulent Diary). These platforms aim to bridge the cultural gap between North and South Koreans.
