= The Countess Kathleen and Various Legends and Lyrics =

The Countess Kathleen and Various Legends and Lyrics (1892) is the second poetry collection of W. B. Yeats.

It includes the play The Countess Cathleen and group of shorter lyrics that Yeats would later collect under the title of The Rose in his Collected Poems.

This volume includes several of Yeats' most popular poems, including "The Lake Isle of Innisfree", "A Faery Song", "When You are Old", and "Who Goes with Fergus".

Many of these poems also reflect Yeats' new-discovered interest in alchemy and esotericism.

== Contents ==
1. Preface
2. The Countess Kathleen
3. To the Rose upon the Rood of Time
4. Fergus and the Druid
5. The Rose of the World
6. The Peace of the Rose
7. The Death of Cuchullin
8. The White Birds
9. Father Gilligan
10. Father O'Hart
11. When You Are Old
12. The Sorrow of Love
13. The Ballad of the Old Foxhunter
14. A Fairy Song
15. The Pity of Love
16. "The Lake Isle of Innisfree" (text)
17. A Cradle Song
18. The Man who Dreamed of Fairy Land
19. Dedication of Irish Tales
20. The Lamentation of the Old Pensioner
21. When You are Sad
22. The Two Trees
23. They Went Forth to the Battle, But They Always Fell
24. An Epitaph
25. Apologia Addressed to Ireland in the Coming Days
26. Notes

== See also ==
- 1892 in poetry
- List of works by William Butler Yeats
