= To the Rose upon the Rood of Time =

1893 poem by W. B. Yeats

"To the Rose upon the Rood of Time" is poem by W. B. Yeats that was published in The Rose in 1893. The poem is one of many early Yeatsian lyrical poems which use the symbol of the rose. The poem consists of twelve rhyming couplets in iambic pentameter.

== Text ==
Red Rose, proud Rose, sad Rose of all my days!
Come near me, while I sing the ancient ways:
Cuchulain battling with the bitter tide;
The Druid, grey, wood-nurtured, quiet eyed,
Who cast round Fergus dreams, and ruin untold;
And thine own sadness, whereof stars, grown old
In dancing silver-sandalled on the sea,
Sing in their high and lonely melody.
Come near, that no more blinded by man's fate,
I find under the boughs of love and hate,
In all poor foolish things that live a day,
Eternal beauty wandering on her way.

Come near, come near, come near—Ah, leave me still
A little space for the rose-breath to fill!
Lest I no more hear common things that crave;
The weak worm hiding down in its small cave,
The field-mouse running by me in the grass,
And heavy mortal hopes that toil and pass;
But seek alone to hear the strange things said
By God to the bright hearts of those long dead,
And learn to chaunt a tongue men do not know.
Come near; I would, before my time to go,
Sing of old Eire and the ancient ways:
Red Rose, proud Rose, sad Rose of all my days.

== Commentary and Interpretation ==
The symbol of the rose in "To the Rose upon the Rood of Time" is firstly one that is constant, binding past and present through its spiritual and romantic referents. Stephen Coote notes that the rose on the rood was a symbol worn around the neck of those belonging to the Hermetic Order of the Golden Dawn: the "female" rose is impaled upon the "male" cross. The union of these two elements was intended to help the wearer transcend beyond the physical and into the spiritual: "the rose could also be seen as intellectual, spiritual and eternal beauty impaled upon the world and suffering with mankind as transcendence becomes immanence."

As a symbol of constancy, the rose is also the symbol of Yeats's undying love for Maud Gonne, as well as the symbol for Ireland herself as a homeland, suffering and dying on the cross, beautiful, tragic, hoping for resurrection. Although Ireland suffers, she remains eternally beautiful, an unchanging factor that transcends time. Whatever the referent, or referents, the permanence of the rose is clear, as it is the "Red Rose, proud Rose, sad Rose of all my days" (line 1). In order for Yeats to tell of the great Celtic heroes, the rose must come near, presumably because the rose has witnessed and embodied the sufferings of the people long past (line 2).

Furthermore, the rose is invited to: "Come near, that no more blinded by man’s fate,/ I find under the boughs of love and hate,/ In all poor foolish things that live a day,/ Eternal beauty wandering on her way" (lines 9-12). "Eternal beauty" is the rose, personified at the end of the stanza, or at the very least made female; however, the word "eternal" is the word to note. The rose always was, and is, and will be forever on the "Rood of Time.

The poem is settled in the rose, to the point that the poem’s tone is one of sweet, suffering melancholy, a tone that is reaching for the sublime. In the 1890s, says Stephen Coote, Yeats was concerned for the "spiritual regeneration of his people": he felt that a spiritual posture of awe, a posture taken before those things that were excellent, beautiful, and full of grandeur, was necessary to achieve that regeneration. The Oxford Dictionary notes that the etymology of "sublime" renders a Latin root, sublimus, meaning "below the threshold". The sublime, then, is that which is so beautiful it borders on the spiritual or the divine: Yeats poses the rose as a starting point for spiritual regeneration, and surrounds this symbol with the beautiful lyricism, euphony, rhyme and meter which characterizes his early poetry.

The repeated phrase "come near" has the feel of an incantation: the rose's proximity, so close, and yet leaving a space large enough for "the rose-breath to fill", contributes to the feeling of being on the verge of the divine (line 14). The lack of complete and utter communion with the rose gives the poem an air of sweet suffering that seems necessary in order to achieve the sublime.

The suffering in the "sad Rose", however, also lends an anxiety to the poem's melancholy, an anxiety that is supported by the allusions to the Irish heroes, buried interminably in Irish ground and in Irish memory. The Druid, a priest, magician and soothsayer of the ancient Celtic religion, long an extinct specimen of Ireland, is here described with romantic and wonderful qualities: "wood-nurtured, quiet-eyed" (line 4). Yeats mourns the lack of the good in occult religion of the past; furthermore, the mention of Cuchulain and Fergus recalls their tragic ends.

Cuchulain was a mythological hero with an Achilles-like story, an unbeatable warrior defeated because of a small weakness. He was betrayed by his enemies and died at the young age of twenty-seven, or as Yeats puts it, as he was "battling with the bitter tide" (line 3). Fergus, on the other hand, is a common name in Irish mythology, but many of these figures died violent deaths or sung out ages in Ireland. According to Yeats, the Druid "cast round Fergus dreams, and ruin untold" (line 5). Their dismal deaths are indeed cataclysmic, and although the events are muted through allusion only, the sadness of such lost greatness is inherent to the poem.

Yeats sings of "old Eire and the ancient ways", an old Ireland that seems lost forever in the passage of time (line 23). It is safe to say that there is conflicted feeling in this poem, but that the feeling does not overpower the sweetness in the melancholy. The rose upon the rood, after all, has witnessed these events and its constancy, despite its suffering, acts as a central answer to the poem's murmurs of anxiety.

Alternatively, the Fergus to whom Yeats refers may be the character portrayed in the 13th century chivalric romance story, Roman de Fergus. In this sense, especially alongside references to Cuchulain and Druids, the piece could be considered a song of praise for the old world, a nostalgia for the honesty, authenticity and complexity of the past—to the "Rose" lost upon the "Rood of Time". In this way the first verse paragraph is Yeats' appeal for these things to "Come near, come near, come near", but the plea is soon followed by hesitation: "Ah, leave me still/A little space for the rose-breath to fill!/Lest I no more hear common things that crave"; the poet acknowledges the fleeting beauty of the immediate, natural world. The poem continues however, returning to echo the original sentiment, his yearning for lost culture- "But seek alone to hear the strange things said/By God to the bright hearts of those long dead/And learn to chaunt a tongue men do not know/Come near".

== Bibliography ==
- Coote, Stephen. W. B. Yeats: A Life. London: Hodder and Stoughton, 1997. pp. 96–97.
- "Cú Chulainn." Encyclopædia Britannica. Encyclopædia Britannica Online. Encyclopædia Britannica, 2010. Web. 7 April 2010.
- Finneran, Richard J., ed. The Collected Poems of W. B. Yeats. New York: Simon & Schuster, 1996. pp. 27–31.
- "Fergus mac Léti." A Dictionary of Celtic Mythology. James McKillop. Oxford University Press, 1998. Oxford Reference Online. Oxford University Press. 8 April 2010.
