= Caitlin Myers =

Economist at Middlebury College

- Education: Tulane University; University of Texas at Austin
- Children: 4
- Scientific career
- Fields: Economics
- Workplaces: Middlebury College
- Website: Official website

Caitlin Knowles Myers is an American economist, currently the John G. McCullough Professor of Economics at Middlebury College and a Research Associate with the National Bureau of Economic Research (NBER).

She is known for her research on the impacts of contraception and abortion policies in the United States. In 2021, when the U.S. Supreme Court agreed to hear the Dobbs vs. Jackson Women's Health Organization case, she led an effort to compile the best economic research on the impact of abortion access on women's lives into an amicus brief, which was signed by more than 150 economists.

== Life ==
Myers grew up in rural West Virginia and Georgia and trained as a labor economist, receiving her PhD from the University of Texas at Austin in 2005. Myers was widowed in 2011, when her husband, firefighter Adam Myers, was killed in a car accident.

== Research ==
Myers' research examines issues related to gender, race, fertility and the economy. In recent work, she has studied the impact of contraception and abortion policies. Her research demonstrates that the liberalization of abortion policies in the 1960s and 1970s allowed large numbers of women to delay marriage and motherhood. She also has studied the effects of mandatory waiting periods, parental involvement laws, and driving distances on abortion and birth rates. Her most recent work assesses the effects of the Dobbs decision on American fertility.

Her work on the changing influence of education on women's age at motherhood and the impact of abortion access on birth rates is featured in the media.

=== Selected works ===
- Myers, Caitlin Knowles (2017). "The Power of Abortion Policy: Reexamining the Effects of Young Women's Access to Reproductive Control". Journal of Political Economy. 125 (6). University of Chicago Press: 2178–2224. doi:10.1086/694293. hdl:10419/62418. ISSN 0022-3808. S2CID 34086984.
- Lindo, Jason; Myers, Caitlin; Schlosser, Andrea; Cunningham, Scott (May 6, 2019). "New Evidence on Abortion Clinic Closures, Access, and Abortions". Journal of Human Resources. 55 (4). University of Wisconsin Press: 1217–9254R3. doi:10.3368/jhr.55.4.1217-9254r3. ISSN 0022-166X. S2CID 197770177.
- Byker, Tanya; Myers, Caitlin; Graff, Maura (2019). "Can a social media campaign increase the use of long-acting reversible contraception? Evidence from a cluster randomized control trial using Facebook". Contraception. 100 (2). Elsevier BV: 116–122. doi:10.1016/j.contraception.2019.04.001. ISSN 0010-7824. PMID 30998929. S2CID 122547657.
- Myers, Caitlin Knowles; Ladd, Daniel (2020). "Did parental involvement laws grow teeth? The effects of state restrictions on minors' access to abortion". Journal of Health Economics. 71. doi:10.1016/j.jhealeco.2020.102302. hdl:10419/170936. PMID 32135395.
- Myers, Caitlin Knowles (2021). "Cooling off or Burdened? The Effects of Mandatory Waiting Periods on Abortions and Births". IZA Discussion Paper 14434.
- Myers, Caitlin Knowles (2022). "Confidential and legal access to abortion and contraception in the USA, 1960–2020". Journal of Population Economics. 35 (4): 1385–1441. doi:10.1007/s00148-022-00902-4.
- Myers, Caitlin Knowles (2024). "Forecasts for a post-Roe America: The effects of increased travel distance on abortions and births". Journal of Policy Analysis and Management. 43 (1): 39–62. doi:10.1002/pam.22524.
- Dench, Daniel; Pineda-Torres, Mayra; Myers, Caitlin (2024). "The effect of the Dobbs decision on fertility". Journal of Public Economics. 234. doi:10.1016/j.jpubeco.2024.105124.
