= List of storms named Caitlin =

The name Caitlin has been used for two tropical cyclones in the western Pacific Ocean.

- Typhoon Caitlin (1991), caused heavy rainfall in the Philippines before turning north and passing through the Korea Strait.
- Tropical Storm Caitlin (1994), struck Taiwan then proceeded west into mainland China.
