= Kathleen Paquette =

American politician

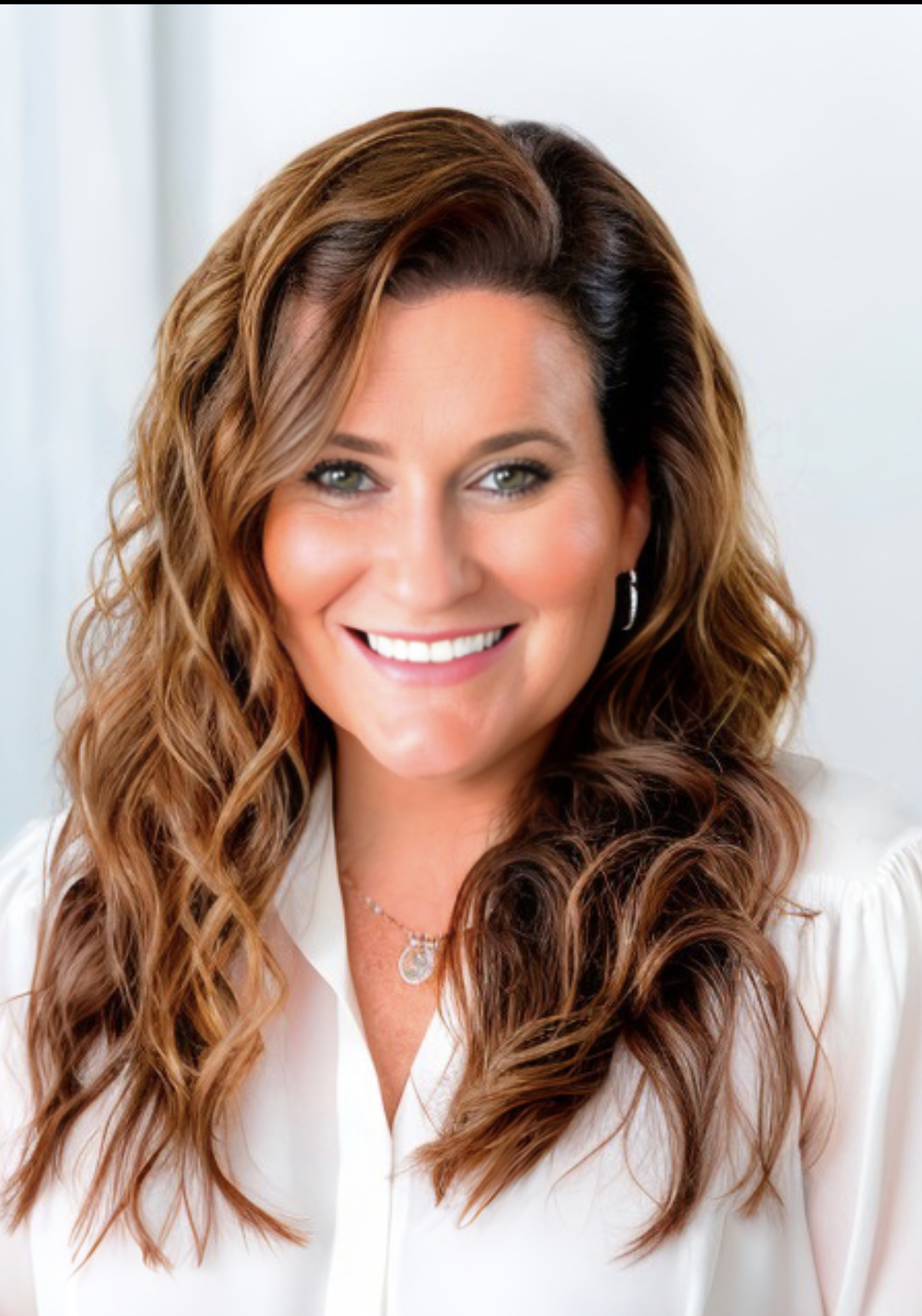

Member of New Hampshire House of Representatives for Hillsborough 25
- Incumbent
- Assumed office December 4, 2024
- Succeeded by: Heather Deiner (elect)

Personal details
- Party: Republican
- Website: kathleenpaquettenh.com

Kathleen Paquette is an American politician. She is a member of the New Hampshire House of Representatives and serves on the Criminal Justice and Public Safety Committee.

She is a business owner in Manchester, NH and has worked for 25 years in physical therapy with a specialty in geriatric medicine.

She is a candidate for Ward 5 Alderman in Manchester, NH.
