= Haksal =

South Korean esports player

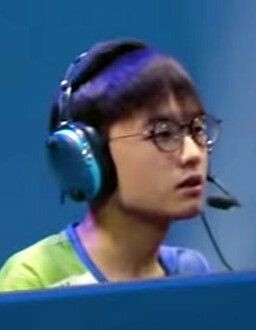

Personal information
- Name: 김효종 (Kim Hyo-jong)
- Born: 2000 or 2001 (age 25–26)
- Nationality: South Korean

Career information
- Game: Overwatch
- Playing career: 2016–2020
- Role: Damage
- Number: 1

Team history
- 2016–2018: RunAway
- 2019–2020: Vancouver Titans
- 2020: New York Excelsior
- 2024: hasbeen
- 2026–present: ONSIDE GAMING

Career highlights and awards
- OWL Rookie of the Year (2019); 2× OWL All-Star (2019, 2020); OWL Role Star (2019); OGN APEX Most Valuable Player (2017); OWC Korea champion (2018)

Kim Hyo-jong (Korean: 김효종), better known by Haksal, is a professional South Korean Overwatch player currently playing for ONSIDE GAMING. During his career, he was best known for his play on the damage hero Genji and support hero Brigitte. He played in the Overwatch League (OWL) for the Vancouver Titans and New York Excelsior and in Overwatch Apex and Overwatch Contenders for team RunAway.

Kim began his professional Overwatch career playing for RunAway in Overwatch Apex, a tournament series in South Korea. He played in all four seasons of the Apex and was named the most valuable player in its fourth season. After Apex dissolved, he competed with RunAway in Overwatch Contenders Korea, winning a championship in Season 2 of 2018. Park signed with the Titans for the 2019 season of the Overwatch League. In his first season, he reached the 2019 Grand Finals, won the OWL's first Rookie of the Year award, and was named both an OWL Role Star and All-Star. Four games into the 2020 season, he was released from the Titans, along with the rest of the roster. Shortly after, he signed with the New York Excelsior and was named an All-Star in the 2020 season. In October 2020, Kim retired from professional Overwatch.

== Professional career ==
=== RunAway ===
Kim began his professional Overwatch career as one of the founding players of Korean team RunAway and played his first official match on October 26, 2016. He quickly made a name for himself as a talented Genji player in Overwatch Apex Season 1. The team competed in all four seasons of the APEX tournament series and reached the finals twice — in Season 2 and Season 4. Although they failed to take the championship both times, Kim was named the APEX Season 4 Most Valuable Player.

After the inception of the Overwatch League, the APEX series ended, and RunAway began to compete in the newly formed Overwatch Contenders (OWC) series. Kim won his first competitive Overwatch title in OWC Season 2. He picked up another tournament championship with Runaway at the Chinese NetEase Esports X Tournament the following month.

=== Vancouver Titans ===
On December 1, 2018, the Aquilini Group announced that Kim, along with all of the other members of RunAway, had been signed to their new expansion team Vancouver Titans for the 2019 Overwatch League season. Through the first three quarters of the 2019 season, the composition that teams ran most frequently was three tanks and three supports (known as the GOATS meta). Although he generally played damage heroes, Kim spent the majority of this time support hero Brigitte. During this time, he ranked first in both damage dealt and healing done among all Brigitte players, won the Stage 1 finals, and reached the Stage 2 finals. After the introduction of the 2–2–2 role lock in Stage 4, in which teams were required to play two damage, two tank, and two support heroes, Kim returned to playing damage heroes, such as Genji and Mei. In Stage 4, he had the highest player impact rating, a rating system used by the Overwatch League, in the stage. Kim was selected for the 2019 All-Star Game, was named an OWL Role Star, and named the 2019 OWL Rookie of the Year. Kim played in the 2019 Grand Finals with the Titans on September 29, 2019; Vancouver lost to the San Francisco Shock, 0–4.

After a 2–2 start to the 2020 season, on May 6, the Titans released their entire roster following ongoing disputes between the organization's management and players.

=== New York Excelsior ===
Kim signed with the New York Excelsior on June 5, 2020. His first match with the team was on June 13, in a 3–0 win over the Seoul Dynasty. At the end of the regular season, Kim was named a 2020 All-Star. The Excelsior were eliminated from playoff contention in the 2020 season after a 0–3 loss to the Dynasty in the Asia-Pacific playoff bracket. Following the losses, Kim announced plans to take an indefinite break from Overwatch but said that he still intended to play for the Excelsior for Season 4. However, on October 20, 2020, the Excelsior officially announced that Kim would be retiring from professional Overwatch.

== National team career ==
On July 26, 2019, it was announced that Kim was selected as a member of Team South Korea for the 2019 Overwatch World Cup (OWWC). With the team, Kim picked up a bronze medal after falling to Team USA in the semifinals and defeating Team France in the third-place match.

Awards and achievements
| Preceded by Incumbent | OWL Rookie of the Year; 2019 | Succeeded by Kim "Alarm" Kyeong-bo |
