= Kathleen Kim (actress) =

American puppeteer

- Born: 1979 or 1980; Queens, New York City, New York, U.S.
- Occupations: Actress, puppeteer

Kathleen Kim (born 1979 or 1980) is an American actress and puppeteer, best known for her puppeteering work on Sesame Street.

== Career ==
Kim began studying puppetry while working in reality television as a story producer.

In 2014, she took a Sesame Puppetry Workshop, and was later brought on to Sesame Street as a puppetry assistant. She performed in Once Upon a Sesame Street Christmas in 2016. In 2017, she and three other performers joined Sesame Street’s first Mentorship Program. Kim took on a consulting producer for the 2021 special "See Us Coming Together,” in which she also performed Ji-Young in her debut as the series' first Asian-American muppet. In addition to Ji-Young, Kim also puppets Elena, the mother of Julia, the series's first autistic character.

Kim also performed in the 2020 comedy series Awkwafina is Nora from Queens as the walk-around character Toe-Knee. Although producers originally planned to dub the character in post-production, they later opted to keep Kim's original vocal performance.

== Filmography ==
Year	Show	Role	Notes	Ref
2016	Once Upon a Sesame Street Christmas		Christmas special	
2019	Helpsters			
2020	Awkwafina is Nora from Queens	Toe-Knee		
2021–present	Sesame Street	Ji-Young, Elena		

== Early and personal life ==
Kim was born in Queens, New York to Korean immigrant parents. She grew up in Manhattan and Long Island, learning English in part by watching Sesame Street. She studied TV/Radio and Children’s Studies at Brooklyn College.

She lives with her husband and daughter in Queens. She was diagnosed with breast cancer in 2017 and underwent a mastectomy.
