= Alarm (gamer) =

South Korean professional Overwatch support player (2001–2021)

Personal information
- Name: 김경보 (Kim Kyeong-bo)
- Born: July 21, 2001
- Died: November 2021 (aged 20)
- Nationality: South Korean

Career information
- Game: Overwatch
- Playing career: 2016–2021
- Role: Support
- Number: 17

Team history
- 2016–2017: BK Stars
- 2017–2018: Lunatic-Hai
- 2018–2019: Fusion University
- 2020–2021: Philadelphia Fusion

Career highlights and awards
- OWL Rookie of the Year (2020); OWL Role Star (2020); OWL All-Star (2020); No. 17 retired by Philadelphia Fusion; OWC Atlantic Showdown champion (2019); 4× OWC North America champion

Kim Kyeong-bo (Korean: 김경보, July 21, 2001 – November 2021), better known by his online alias Alarm, was a South Korean professional Overwatch support player in the Overwatch League (OWL). He began his career in 2016, signing with BK Stars, and later played for Lunatic-Hai and Fusion University of Overwatch Contenders (OWC). In his time with Fusion University, Kim won four OWC regional championships and won the OWC interregional Atlantic Showdown tournament.

Kim signed with the Philadelphia Fusion of the OWL ahead of the 2020 season. He was named the OWL's Rookie of the Year, nominated for the league's Most Valuable Player award, named a 2020 All-Star, and awarded with a Role Star commendation that year. Kim died in November 2021.

== Professional career ==
=== Early career ===
Kim began his playing career with team BK Stars in 2016, playing in the South Korean tournament series Overwatch Apex. He began as a tank player, before changing to a support player in 2017. After three seasons with limited success in Apex, BK Stars disbanded. In 2017, Kim signed with South Korean team Lunatic-Hai, although the team disbanded shortly thereafter.

Kim signed with Fusion University, the academy team of the Philadelphia Fusion, in 2018, competing in Overwatch Contenders North America. In his first season, he won OWC North America, after Fusion University defeated Toronto Esports, 4–1 in the finals. He and the team found continued success, winning the following three seasons of OWC North America. Following his fourth North America title, Kim won the interregional OWC Atlantic Showdown tournament.

=== Philadelphia Fusion ===
After turning 18, Kim was promoted from the Fusion University, joining the Philadelphia Fusion of the Overwatch League for the 2020 season. During his rookie season, Kim played on a variety of different support heroes, helping the Fusion place as runners-up in three of the league's midseason tournaments. The Fusion had their best season in franchise history, finishing second in the regular season standings; however, the team lost in the first round of the Grand Finals bracket. In the 2020 season, Kim was nominated for the league's most valuable player award, was awarded a Role Star commendation, selected to participate in the 2020 All-Star Game, and won the Rookie of the Year award.

== Legacy ==
On May 5, 2022, the Overwatch League renamed their Rookie of the Year award to the Alarm Rookie of the Year Award, in remembrance of Kim.

Kim's number 17 jersey was retired by the Fusion on February 27, 2023.

== Personal life ==
Kim was born on July 21, 2001.

He died in November 2021; the cause of death was not reported.

Awards and achievements
Preceded by Kim "Haksal" Hyo-jong	Overwatch Rookie of the Year; 2020	Succeeded by Oh "Pelican" Se-hyun
