= Kathleen Culhane Lathbury =

British biochemist

Kathleen Culhane Lathbury (14 January 1900 - 9 May 1993) was a British biochemist known for her work with insulin and vitamins. Lathbury worked as an overseer at British Drug Houses where she was responsible for supervising the manufacture of insulin to make sure it was effective. After her retirement she took up painting and was exhibited in the Royal Academy. She was still driving at the age of 90. She had three sisters, Norah (later Nicholls), Rosalind (later Lady Padmore), Christine and two brothers, Robert (who died in his teens), and Michael who all had equally remarkable lives

== Early life ==
Kathleen Culhane was born 14 January 1900. She was the second to last child born in her family. Her mother died when she was young, and her father, a medical doctor, raised her. Culhane attended Hastings and St. Leonards College, then Hastings School of Science. Afterwards, she attended Royal Holloway College from 1918–1922, where she found her interest in chemistry and graduated with an honors degree in chemistry.

== Career ==
After graduating, she was interested in entering the chemical field, but was met with complications. Employers were not interested in hiring a woman in a chemist position. Kathleen Culhane would sign her applications with "K. Culhane" instead of "Kathleen Culhane" in order to improve her chances, but once the interviewers discovered her gender, she did not obtain any job. She worked as a school teacher and a private tutor to provide for herself.

Culhane joined the Institute of Chemistry, where she worked in her free time for no money. She performed emergency sugar determinations and met John R. Marrack of Hale Clinical Laboratory of the London Hospital while there. After two years of teaching and her unpaid work, she obtained an industrial chemistry position with Neocellon, Wandsworth, a manufacturer of lacquers and enamels. The company hired her because they could not afford a male chemist's salary. Culhane would receive a job offer from Dr. Marrack at the Hale Clinical Laboratory with a paid position as a chemical adviser and insulin tester. Again through Marrack, she was offered a position as to oversee the manufacture and test the effectiveness of insulin in the physiology department of British Drug Houses. Due to the lunch room being male-only, she would eat with the women cleaners and clerks.

In 1928, Kathleen Culhane joined the League of Nations Health Organization Committee to compare the physiological activity of amorphous and crystalline insulin. The results she obtained were different from the other participants prompting the Committee to conclude her research was incorrect insisting that she remove them. Culhane did not, and her research was later proven to be more accurate.

In 1933, she started a study on vitamins and published research on it as well as married Major G. P. Lathbury. Contrary to the British Civil Service bar on marriage in 1918, Culhane was still employed even after her marriage due to the directors viewing her work as important. However, she resigned her position as senior chemist in 1935 due to pregnancy and her male replacement received a higher salary than that she had earned at the end of her career.

Once World War II commenced, Kathleen Culhane Lathbury offered her assistance to the war effort in 1939. She was first assigned to the position of an assistant wages clerk, but eventually, was appointed manager of a statistical quality control department at a Royal Ordnance Factory.

After the war ended, she retired from science at Grayshott in Hampshire and started a second career as a botanical artist. She also painted many portraits. She became a member of the Haslemere and Farnham Art Society having some art included in professional exhibits. She died 9 May 1993.

== Family ==
Kathleen was the daughter of Dr Frederick William Slater Culhane MRCS (1855–1920), for many years resident surgeon at the Hastings' Work House, and his wife Mary Lucie 'Minnie' née Dann (1861–1911). In 1933 Kathleen married Major George Pinckard Lathbury (1883–1957) of the Royal Marines. They had a daughter Rosalind Mary Culhane Lathbury (later Bramley) (1936–1996).
