= Toronto Defiant =

Canadian professional esports team

- Founded: September 7, 2018
- Folded: December 12, 2024
- League: Overwatch Champions Series (2024); Overwatch League (2018–2023)
- Region: West
- Team history: Toronto Defiant (2018–present)
- Based in: Toronto, Canada
- Arena: Scotiabank Arena
- Colours
- Owner: Chris Overholt
- Affiliations: Montreal Rebellion (former academy team); Toronto Ultra (branding, 2024)
- Main sponsor: Bell Canada
- Parent group: OverActive Media
- Website: Official website

Uniforms

Toronto Defiant was a Canadian professional Overwatch esports team based in Toronto, Canada. Founded in 2018 as an expansion team for the Overwatch League (OWL), Toronto began play in 2019 and was one of two OWL teams based in Canada (the other being Vancouver Titans). Following the termination of the Overwatch League, the Defiant played in the Overwatch Champions Series. The team was owned by OverActive Media, who also owned the Montreal Rebellion, a former academy team for the Defiant that competed in Overwatch Contenders (OWC).

== History ==
=== Overwatch League: 2018–2023 ===
On September 7, 2018, Blizzard Entertainment announced that OverActive Media (OAM) had purchased a slot for a Toronto-based franchise. On the same day, Splyce announced that they would be working with OAM to form and operate the unnamed Toronto team, with OAM's Chris Overholt and Splyce's Marty Strenczewilk as the team owners. Former CEO of the Canadian Olympic Committee Chris Overholt was named the president and CEO of the franchise. "Who could have predicted what [esport] is and what this has become globally," Overholt said in an interview. "This thing is not set to explode, it's exploding and I think we're well positioned to take this on in Toronto and Canada."

Lee "Bishop" Beom-joon was appointed as the team's first head coach after interviewing with the General Manager, Jaesun Won. Jaesun Won had come over as GM of the Toronto Defiant after being the North American Teams Manager and Assistant GM for Splyce. On October 24, 2018, OAM and Splyce officially revealed the branding, name, and staff of the team. General Manager Jaesun "Jae" Won and Head Coach "Bishop" would be joined by assistant coach Yun "Bubbly" Ho Cho, strategic coach Kim "Don" Dongwook, and analyst Dennis "Barroi" Matz. The team signed an all-Korean roster, composed of OWL players and experienced Overwatch Contenders Korea players.

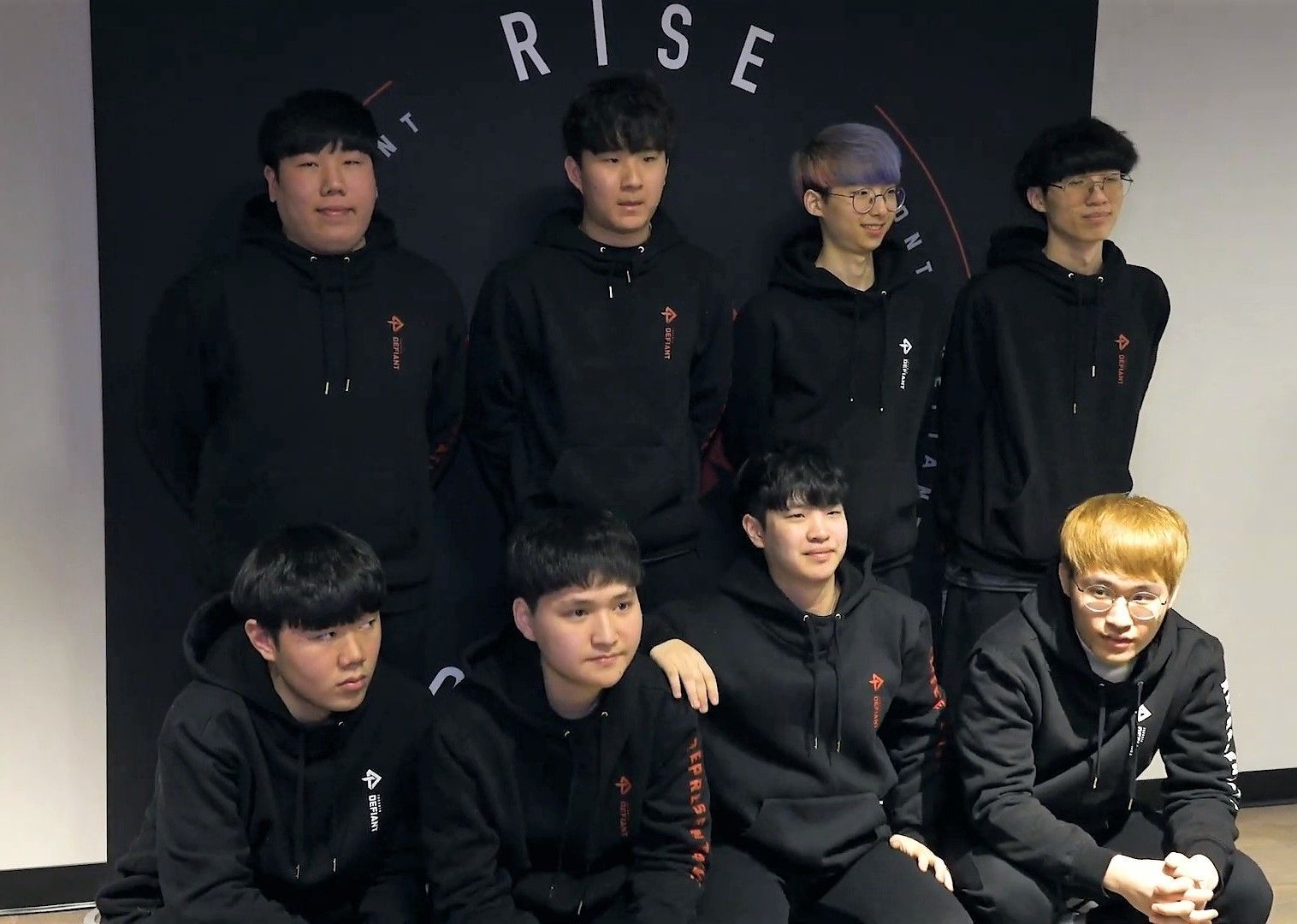
Toronto Defiant roster entering the 2019 season

Toronto Defiant's first regular season OWL match was a 3–2 victory against the Houston Outlaws on February 15, 2019, in their inaugural season. After posting a 5–2 record in Stage 1, the Defiant qualified for the Stage 1 playoffs, but a 0–3 loss against the Shock eliminated the team in the quarterfinals. Throughout the remainder of the season, Toronto gradually added more Western players to their roster, such as the damage players Andreas "Logix" Berghmans and Liam "Mangachu" Campbell. The team failed to recreate the success they found in Stage 1, winning only three matches in their final four months of play. A 2–3 loss to the Fusion on August 4 officially eliminated Toronto from postseason contention, and three days later, the team released head coach Bishop, leaving assistant coaches Optidox, Mobydik, and Barroi to lead the team in the final weeks of the regular season.

Over the following off-season, the Defiant parted ways with the vast majority of their roster, aside from support player Park "RoKy" Joo-seong, Logix, and Mangachu. The team rebuilt around a core of Canadian Overwatch players, such as damage players Lane "Surefour" Roberts and Brady "Agilities" Girardi. Additionally, the team signed former Paris Eternal coach Felix "Féfé" Münch as team's new head coach. After a 3–5 start to the 2020 season, head coach Féfé retired, with assistant coach David "Lilbow" Moschetto taking his place as interim head coach for the remainder of the season. The Defiant struggled to find much success for the remainder of the season, with the exception of a run during the North America Summer Showdown tournament, in which Defiant made the semifinals. Toronto finished the season in 15th place overall with a 8–14 record, including bonus wins. The team advanced to the North America play-in tournament, where they lost to the Los Angeles Gladiators by a score of 2–3.

In the offseason preceding the 2021 season, the Defiant again overhauled their roster, releasing all of their players, aside from Logix. The team signed former Philadelphia Fusion head coach Kim "KDG" Dong-gun as their new head coach, who signed a mix of veterans and rookies to the team. In late May 2021, the Defiant had a COVID-19 outbreak in its facility, sidelining both of their damage players, Logix and Jeong "Heesu" Hee-su. The team signed rookie Luka "Aspire" Rolovic on a 30-day contract as a replacement, but after his performance on the team, Toronto signed him to a full contract. The Defiant had a 6–6 record entering the final tournament cycle of the season, the Countdown Cup. In the final week of the regular season, the Defiant defeated the Paris Eternal to secure a spot in the West play-in tournament. However, the team lost to the San Francisco Shock in the play-in finals on September 5.

Prior to the start of the 2022 season, Toronto dropped all of their players, aside from Heesu. The team signed several veterans, including former Shock support player Lee "Twilight" Ju-seok, former Los Angeles Gladiators tank player Kim "MuZe" Young-hun, and former Fusion tank player Choi "HOTBA" Hong-joon. After a win 3–0 win over the Boston Uprising, the Defiant qualified for the 2022 season playoffs and became one of five teams in the league that had qualified for every tournament in the season. Toronto finished the regular season with a 12–12 record and the seventh seed in the season playoffs. The Defiant lost to the Houston Outlaws, 0–3, in the first round of the playoffs, dropping them to the lower bracket. They lost their following match to the Hangzhou Spark, 2–3, ending their season.

=== Overwatch Champions Series: 2024 ===
Following the end of the Overwatch League following the 2023 season, Activision-Blizzard would announce the Overwatch Champions Series, a new esports circuit to replace it in 2024. On February 7, 2024, the Defiant announced that they would participate in the North America region of the OWCS, complete with a North American roster; the Defiant kept their branding as a result of their parent company OverActive Media being granted the branding from Activision-Blizzard following the end of the OWL. The team would win their first two splits in the OWCS in convincing fashion before finishing tied for 5th at the OWCS Major at DreamHack Dallas, losing to eventual champions Crazy Raccoon in the upper bracket and then ENCE in the lower bracket.

On June 27, 2024, OverActive Media announced that the Defiant, who had qualified for the Overwatch 2 tournament at the Esports World Cup via winning the FACEIT League NA Master tournament, would be playing under the Toronto Ultra name for that tournament. The Toronto Ultra have historically been the name of OverActive Media's Call of Duty League team.

On December 12, 2024, OverActive Media CEO Adam Adamou announced that the organization would be "taking a break from Overwatch in 2025," and moreover, if they decided to return to competitive Overwatch, the company would not compete under the Defiant branding.

== Team identity ==
On October 24, 2018, the franchise name was revealed as the Toronto Defiant; the name "Defiant" was chosen to "represent the strength, character, and resiliency of Toronto." Branding work was done in partnership with the Overwatch League and OverActive's agency of record Diamond Marketing. The logo and official colors were also released. The logo for Toronto Defiant displays the letter T inscribed in the letter D in the team's colours of red, black, white, and grey.

== Personnel ==
=== Head coaches ===
| Handle | Name | Seasons | Record | Notes | Ref. |
|---|---|---|---|---|---|
| jae | Jaesun Won | 2019-2022 | *-* () | General Manager, retired during the COVID-19 pandemic. | |
| Bishop | Lee Beom-joon | 2019 | 8–17 (.320) | Released after 25 games in 2019. | |
| Barroi | Dennis Matz | 2019 | 0–3 (.000) | Interim co-head coaches. | |
| Mobydik | Shim Sungbo | 2019 | 0–3 (.000) | Interim co-head coaches. | |
| Optidox | May Sims | 2019 | 0–3 (.000) | Interim co-head coaches. | |
| Féfé | Félix Münch | 2020 | 3–5 (.375) | Released after eight games in 2020. | |
| Lilbow | David Moschetto | 2020 | 4–9 (.308) | Interim head coach. | |
| KDG | Kim Dong-gun | 2021–2022 | 13–9 (.591) | Released after six games in 2022. | |
| Mobydik | Shim Sungbo | 2022 | 8–10 (.444) | Interim head coach. | |
| Casores | Cas van Andel | 2023–present | 8–8 (.500) | | |

== Awards and records ==
=== Seasons overview ===
| Season | P | W | L | W% | Finish | Playoffs |
|---|---|---|---|---|---|---|
| 2019 | 28 | 8 | 20 | .286 | 7th, Atlantic | Did not qualify |
| 2020 | 21 | 7 | 14 | .333 | 6th, North America | Did not qualify |
| 2021 | 16 | 9 | 7 | .563 | 7th, West | Did not qualify |
| 2022 | 24 | 12 | 12 | .500 | 8th, West | Lost in Lower Round 1, 2–3 (Spark) |
| 2022 | 16 | 8 | 8 | .500 | 6th, West | Did not qualify |
| 2023 | 16 | 8 | 8 | .500 | 5th, West | Did not qualify |

=== Individual accomplishments ===
All-Star Game selections

- Neko (Park Se-Hyun) – 2019
- Agilities (Brady Girardi) – 2020
- Kariv (Youngseo Bak) – 2020
- Nevix (Andreas Karlsson) – 2020

== Academy team ==
On February 14, 2019, Overactive Media partnered with Mirage Sport Électronique to launch Toronto Defiant's official academy team in Montreal to compete in Overwatch Contenders. "We are really excited about partnering with Yannick and his team to launch the first pro esports franchise in Quebec," Overholt said in an interview. "Today is about continuing our commitment to growing esports nationwide, and expanding our Toronto Defiant fanbase in Quebec and across Eastern Canada." On February 19, the franchise announced that the team would be known as the Montreal Rebellion.
