= List of Irish-language given names =

List of names originating from the Irish language

This list of Irish-language given names shows Irish language given names, their anglicisations and/or English language equivalents.

Not all Irish given names have English equivalents, though most names have an anglicised form. Some Irish names have false cognates, i.e. names that look similar but are not etymologically related, e.g. Áine is commonly accepted as the Irish equivalent of the etymologically unrelated names Anna and Anne. During the "Irish revival", some Irish names which had fallen out of use were revived. Some names are recent creations, such as the now-common female names Saoirse "freedom" and Aisling "vision, dream".

Some English-language names are anglicisations of Irish names, e.g. Kathleen from Caitlín and Shaun from Seán. Some Irish-language names derive from English names, e.g. Éamonn from Edmund. Some Irish-language names have English equivalents, both deriving from a common source, e.g. Irish Máire (anglicised Maura), Máirín (Máire + -ín "a diminutive suffix"; anglicised Maureen) and English Mary all derive from French: Marie, which ultimately derives from Hebrew: מַרְיָם (maryām).

There are more historical Irish given names than can be found on this list, e.g. rare Middle or Old Irish names from the Middle Ages, but it would be impractical to list them all since there is practically an infinite amount of possible names and variants.

== Native ==
=== Native feminine names ===
| Name | Anglicisation and/or equivalent | Notes | Ref |
|---|---|---|---|
| Aifric | | | |
| Ailbhe | Alvy, Elva (anglicisations) | | |
| Áine | Anna, Anne (Used as an English equivalent, although unrelated), Anya (anglicisation) | | |
| Aisling | Ashling, Ashlyn (anglicisations) | "dream" or "vision" | |
| Aodhnait | Enat, Ena (anglicisation) | Feminine form of Aodhán. | |
| Aoibheann | Eavan (anglicisation) | | |
| Aoife | Eva (English equivalent) | | |
| Barrdhubh | Barduv (anglicisation) | | |
| Béibhinn | Bevin (anglicisation), Vivian (equivalent) | | |
| Bláithín; Bláthnaid | Blanid (anglicisation), Flora, Florence (equivalents) | "little flower" "flower" | |
| Bríd (Brighid); Brídín (Brighidín) | Bridget, Brigid, Brigit (English equivalents); Breed(a), Brid(i)e (anglicisations) | | |
| Brónach | Bronagh (anglicisation) | | |
| Caoil(fh)ionn | Keelin (anglicisation) | Means "slender-fair", from caol "slender" + fionn "fair". | |
| Caoimhe | Keeva (anglicisation) | | |
| Ciannait | Kinnat, Keenat (anglicisations) | Feminine diminutive of Cian, equivalent to Cianán. | |
| Ciara | Keira (equivalent) | "dark-haired" | |
| Clío(dh)na | Cleena (anglicisation) | | |
| Damhnait | Devnet, Downet (anglicisation) Dymphna (equivalent) | Feminine diminutive of damh "fawn, little deer", equivalent to masculine Damhán. | |
| Dearbh(fh)áil | Derval (anglicisation); Dervilia (latinisation) | | |
| Dearbhfhorghaill | | Means "daughter of Forgall". | |
| Deirbh(fh)ile | Dervla (anglicisation) | | |
| Deirdre | | | |
| Doireann | Dorothy | | |
| Éadaoin | Aideen (anglicisation); Edwina (equivalent) | | |
| Earnait | | Feminine diminutive of earna "knowing", equivalent to masculine Earnán. | |
| Éimhear; Eimhear; Eimhir | Emer, Evir (anglicisations) | | |
| Eithne | Edna, Ena, Enya, Et(h)na, Ethenia (anglicisations) | | |
| Faoiltiarna | Whiltierna (anglicisation) | | |
| Fia(dh); Fia(dh)nait | Feena(t) | Means "a wild creature/deer". | |
| Fíniúin; Fíneamhain | | | |
| Fíona | Fiona (anglicisation) | | |
| Fionnabhair; Fionnúir | | | |
| Fionn(gh)uala | Finola, Finuala, Nola (anglicisations) | | |
| Flannait | Flannad, Flannit (anglicisations) | Female diminutive of Flann "bright/blood red". | |
| Gobnait | Gobnat, Gobnet, Gobinet, Abbey (equivalent) | | |
| Gorm(fh)laith | Gorml(e)y (anglicisation) | | |
| Gráinne | Grania, Granya (anglicisation); Grace (equivalent) | | |
| Íde | Eeda, Ida, Ita (anglicisations) | | |
| Lasairfhíona | Lasareena, Lassarina, Lazarina (anglicisations) | | |
| Luíseach | Lucy (English equivalent) | | |
| Méabh(a); Méibhín | Mave, Maeve, Meave(en) (anglicisations) | | |
| Mealla | Mella (anglicisation) | | |
| Míde | Meeda (anglicisation) | | |
| Mór | | | |
| Móirín | Moreen (anglicisation) | Pet form of Mór. | |
| Mua(dh)nait | Monat, Moonit, Mona (anglicisations) | Female form of Mu(adh)án "noble/good". | |
| Muireann | Morrin, Miran (anglicisations); Marion (English equivalent) | | |
| Muirgheal | Muriel, Murel (anglicisation) | Means "sea white". | |
| Naoise | | | |
| Neasa | | | |
| Niamh | Neve, Neev(e) (anglicisations) | | |
| Nuala | | | |
| Odharnait(h) | Ornat, Orna (anglicisations) | Feminine form of Odhrán. | |
| Ór(fh)la(ith) | Orla (anglicisation) | | |
| Rathnait | | | |
| Ríona(ch) | Rina(gh) (anglicisation); Regina (English equivalent) | | |
| Sadhbh(a) | Sabina, Sally (equivalents); Saev, Sive (anglicisations) | | |
| Saoirse | | | |
| Saor(fh)la(ith) | Searla(h) (anglicisation) | Means "free born princess". | |
| Síofra | | | |
| Sío(th)mha(ith) | | | |
| Sláine | Slaney (anglicisation) | | |
| Sorcha | Sally, Sarah (English equivalents) | | |
| Tuath(fh)la(ith) | Tuala(h) (anglicisation) | | |
| Úna | Oona(gh), Una (anglicisations); Agnes, Unity, Winifred (English equivalents) | | |

=== Native masculine names ===
| Name | Anglicisation and/or equivalent | Notes | Ref |
|---|---|---|---|
| Aibhne | Eveny (anglicisation) | | |
| Ailbhe | Albert, Elvis (English equivalents) | | |
| Ailín | Allen (anglicisation) | | |
| Aodh | Hugh (English equivalent) | | |
| Aodhán | Aidan (anglicisation) | Diminutive of Aodh | |
| Ao(dha)gán | Egan (anglicisation) | Double diminutive of Aodh. | |
| Aonghas | Aeneas, Angus, Neese (anglicisations) | | |
| Ardghal | Ardal (anglicisation) | Means "high valour/valorous as a bear". | |
| Art | | | |
| Barra | Barry (anglicisation) | From Fionnbharr ("fair-haired") | |
| Bearach | Barry (anglicisation) | | |
| Bearchán | | Diminutive of Bearach. | |
| Bran | | | |
| Breasal | Brasil (anglicisation), Basil (equivalent) | | |
| Breandán | Brendan (anglicisation) | | |
| Brian | Bryan (anglicisation) | | |
| Brochadh | | Connacht variant of Murchadh. | |
| Buach; Buadhach | Buagh (anglicisation) | | |
| Cainneach; Coinneach | Kenny (anglicisation), Canice (equivalent) | | |
| Cairbre | Carbra, Carbry (anglicisation) | | |
| Calbhach | Calvagh (anglicisation) | | |
| Caoimhín | Kevin (anglicisation) | | |
| Caolán | Kealan, Kelan (anglicisations), Kyle (equivalent) | | |
| Caomhán | Kevan (anglicisation) | | |
| Cárthach | Cartagh (anglicisation) | | |
| Cathal | Cahal (anglicisation), Charles (equivalent) | | |
| Cathbharr | Caffar (anglicisation) | | |
| Cathaoir | Cahir (anglicisation), Charles (equivalent) | Means "warrior" | |
| Ceallach; Ceallachán | Kellagh, Callaghan (anglicisations) | | |
| Cearbhall | Carroll (anglicisation), Charles (equivalent) | | |
| Cian | Cain, Kian, Kean (anglicisations) | | |
| Cianán | Keenan, Kienan (anglicisations) | Diminutive of Cian. | |
| Ciarán | Keiran, Kieran (anglicisations) | | |
| Cillian | Killian (anglicisation) | | |
| Cinnéididh; Cinnéidigh | Kennedy (anglicisation) | | |
| Coileán; Coilín; Cuileán | Colin, Collin (anglicisations) | | |
| Coireall | Kerill (anglicisation), Cyril (equivalent) | | |
| Colla | | | |
| Comán | Coman (anglicisation) | | |
| Comhghall | Cole (anglicisation) | | |
| Comhghan | Cowan (anglicisation) | | |
| Conaire | Conary (anglicisation) | | |
| Conall | Connell (anglicisation) | | |
| Conán | Conan (anglicisation) | Meaning 'wolf lover'. | |
| Conchúr; Conchobhar | Conor, Connor (anglicisations) | | |
| Conghalach | | | |
| Conmhac | | | |
| Conn | | | |
| Connla | | | |
| Connlaodh | Conley, Conleth (anglicisation) | | |
| Cormac | Charles (anglicisation) | | |
| Cosnamhach | | | |
| Criomhthann | Crevan (anglicisation) | | |
| Cróchán | Crohan (anglicisation) | | |
| Crónán | Cronan (anglicisation) | | |
| Cuan | | | |
| Cuimín | Cumin (anglicisation) | | |
| Dabhag; Dabhóg | | | |
| Dáithí | Dahy (anglicisation), David (equivalent) | | |
| Damhán | Devin (anglicisation), | | |
| Dáire | Daire, Dara, Darragh, Daragh (anglicisations) | | |
| Déaglán | Declan (anglicisation) | | |
| Deasmhumhnach | Desmond (anglicisation) | Translates as "native of South Munster". | |
| Diarmaid; Diarmuid | Dermot, Dermod (anglicisations), Jeremiah (equivalent) | Believed to mean 'without envy'. | |
| Dónall; Dónal | Donal, Donald (anglicisation), Daniel (equivalent) | Meaning 'World mighty'. Etymologically unrelated to Daniel, from the Hebrew, meaning 'God is my judge'. | |
| Donn; Donnán (dim.) | | | |
| Donnchadh | Donagh, Donough (anglicisations), Denis (equivalent) | | |
| Dúltach; Dubhaltach | Dualtagh, Duald, Dudley (anglicisations) | | |
| Du(bh)án | Dowan (anglicisation) | | |
| Dubhghall | Dougal, Dugal, Dugald (anglicisations) | Meaning 'Dark foreigner'. | |
| Dubhghlas | Douglas (anglicisation) | | |
| Dúnlang | Dowling (anglicisation) | | |
| Eachaidh | Achy, Aghy (anglicisations) | A variation of Eochaidh. | |
| Eachann | Hector (equivalent) | | |
| Éanán | Enan (anglicisation) | | |
| Éanna | Enna, Ena, Enda, Einde (anglicisations) | | |
| Earcán | Ercan (anglicisation) | | |
| Earnán; Eirnín | Ernan, Ernin (anglicisations) | | |
| Éibhear | Ever, Evir, Heber, Ivor (anglicisations) | Of unknown origin. | |
| Éigneach(án); Eigneach(án) | | | |
| Éimhín | Evin (anglicisation) | | |
| Eireamhón | Erevan, Irvin, Irwin, Eremon, Heremon (anglicisations) | | |
| Eochaidh | Eochy, Oghie (anglicisations) | | |
| Eoghan; Eoghainín | Owen (anglicisation) | | |
| Fachtna | Fachny (anglicisation) | Meaning 'malicious, hostile'. | |
| Fáilbhe | Falvy (anglicisation) | | |
| Faolán | Felan (anglicisation) | Meaning 'little wolf'. | |
| Fearadhach | Faragh, Farry (anglicisations) | | |
| Feardorcha | Firdorcha, Fardoragh (anglicisations), Frederick, Ferdinand (equivalent) | | |
| Fearganainm | Fergananym (anglicisation), Ferdinand (equivalent) | Means "nameless" (literally "man without name") and was allegedly first given to men who had not been baptised in childhood. | |
| Fearghal | Fergal, Farrell (anglicisations) | | |
| Fearghas | Fergus | | |
| Feichín | Fehin (anglicisation) | | |
| Féilim (Feidhlim); Feidhlimidh | Felim(y), Phelim(y) (anglicisations); Felix, Philip (equivalents) | | |
| Fiacha; Fiachra | Feagh, Feary (anglicisations) | | |
| Finghin | Finnin, Finneen, Fineen (anglicisations) | | |
| Fionn; Fiontán | Finn, Finian, Fintan (anglicisations) | | |
| Fionnbharr | Finbar (anglicisation) | | |
| Fitheal | Fial (anglicisation) | | |
| Flann; Flannán (dim.) | | | |
| Garbhán | Garvan (anglicisation) | | |
| Glaisne | Glasny (anglicisation) | | |
| Irial | | | |
| Lachtna | | | |
| Laoiseach | Lysach, Lysagh (anglicisations); Lewis, Louis (equivalents) | Means "belonging to Laois" a historic territory/county. | |
| Lasairian | Laserian (anglicisation) | Means "of the flames". | |
| Lochlann | Loughlin, Laughlin (anglicisations) | Means Scandinavia | |
| Lomán | Loman (anglicisation) | | |
| Lonán | Lonan (anglicisation) | Means "blackbird". | |
| Lorcán | Lorcan, Larkin (anglicisations); Laurence (equivalent) | | |
| Lughaidh | Lewy (anglicisation); Lewis, Louis (equivalents) | | |
| Manchán; Mainchín | Munchin (anglicisation) | | |
| Maodhóg | Mogue (anglicisations) | A diminutive of Aodh, the ⟨m⟩ represents mo "my". | |
| Maoilín | | | |
| Maoilir | Meyler (anglicisation) | | |
| Maol(sh)eachlainn | Melaghlin (anglicisation); Malachy, Milo (equivalents) | | |
| Maolru(adh)áin | Melrone (anglicisation) | | |
| Mathúin (Mathghamhain) | Mahon (anglicisation) | | |
| Muircheartach | Murtagh, Murtaugh, Murty (anglicisations); Mortimer (equivalent) | | |
| Muire(adh)ach | Murry (anglicisation) | | |
| Muirgheas | Maurice (equivalent) | | |
| Murchadh | Murrough (anglicisation) | | |
| Naoise | | | |
| Naomhán | Nevan (anglicisation) | | |
| Naos | Neese (anglicisation) | | |
| Neachtan | Naghtan (anglicisation) | | |
| Neasán | Nessan (anglicisation) | | |
| Niall(án) | Neil, Neal(e) (anglicisations) | | |
| Odhrán | Oran (anglicisation) | | |
| Oisín | Ossian, Osheen (anglicisations) | | |
| Oscar | | | |
| Rian | Ryan (anglicisation) | | |
| Rónán | Ronan (anglicisation) | | |
| Ros | Ross (anglicisation) | | |
| Ruairí | Rory, Rury (anglicisations); Roger (English equivalent) | | |
| Ru(adh)án | Rowan (anglicisation) | | |
| Saorbhreathach | | | |
| Séadna | Sidney (anglicisation) | | |
| Seanán | Senan (anglicisation) | | |
| Siadhal; Siaghal | Shiel (anglicisation) | | |
| Síoda | | Means "Silk". | |
| Suibhne | Sivn(e)y (anglicisation) | | |
| Tadhg | Teague (anglicisation), Timothy (equivalent) | | |
| Taithleach | Thallach (anglicisation) | | |
| Tarlach; Toirdhealbhach | Turlough (anglicisation); Terry (equivalent) | | |
| Tiarnach; Tiarnán | Tierny, Tiernan (anglicisations) | Both derived from tiarna "lord". | |
| Tuathal | Toal (anglicisations) | | |

== Foreign origin ==
=== Feminine names of foreign origin ===
| Name | Foreign equivalent and/or anglicisation(s) | Origin | Ref |
|---|---|---|---|
| Abaigeal | Abigail (English equivalent) | Derived from Abigail. | |
| Abaigh | Abby (English equivalent) | Derived from Abigail. | |
| Agata | Agatha (English equivalent) | From Greek Agatha. | |
| Aibhilín | Evelyn (English equivalent) | Variant of Eibhlín. | |
| Aignéis | Agnes (English equivalent) | From Greek Agnes. | |
| Ailís | Alice (English equivalent) | Derived from Alice. | |
| Ailíse | Alicia (English equivalent) | Derived from Alicia. | |
| Aingeal | Angela (English equivalent) | From Greek Angela. | |
| Bairbre | Barbara (English equivalent) | From Greek Barbara. | |
| Béatraís | Beatrice (English equivalent) | From Latin Beatrice. | |
| Caireann | Corinne (English equivalent) | From Greek korē. | |
| Cáit | Kate (English equivalent) | Derived from Katherine. | |
| Caitlín | Caitlin, Kaitlyn, Kathleen (anglicisations); Katherine (English equivalent) | Derived from Katherine. | |
| Caitrín | Katherine (English equivalent) | Derived from Katherine. | |
| Caitríona; Catraoine | Catriona (anglicisation); Katherine (English equivalent) | Derived from Katherine. | |
| Cristín; Cristíona | Christine, Christina (English equivalent) | From Latin Christiana. | |
| Éabha | Eve (English equivalent) | Derived from Eve or Eva. | |
| Éibhleann; Eibhlín | Eileen (anglicisation); Evelyn (English equivalent) | From Norman French Aveline. | |
| Éile | | | |
| Eiléanóir; Eileanóir | Helenor (English equivalent) | From French Eléonore. | |
| Eilís; Eilíse | Liz, Eliza, Elizabeth (English equivalents) | From Elizabeth. | |
| Eimíle | Emily (English equivalent) | From Latin Emilia. | |
| Eistir | Esther (English equivalent) | Derived from Esther, ultimately from Hebrew Hadassah. | |
| Hilde | Hilda (English equivalent) | From Hilda. | |
| Isibéal; Sibéal | Isabella (English equivalent) | From Hebrew Elisheba. | |
| Léan | Eleanor (English equivalent) | From French Eléonore. | |
| Máible | Mabel (English equivalent) | From Latin Mabel. | |
| Máire | Moira, Moya (anglicisations); Maria, Marie, Mary (English equivalents) | From Old French Marie. | |
| Mairéad; Mái(gh)réad | Madge, Maggie, Margaret (English equivalents) | From Greek Margaret. | |
| Máirín | Maureen, Maurene, Maurine (anglicisations) | A pet form of Máire. | |
| Maitilde | Matilda (English equivalent) | From Matilda. | |
| Mícheáilín | Michaela (English equivalent) | Derived from Michael. | |
| Moncha | Monica (English equivalent) | Derived from Monica. | |
| Nainsí | Nancy (English equivalent) | Derived from Nancy. | |
| Nollaig | Natalia, Natalie, Noelle (English equivalent) | From Latin nātālis. | |
| Nóinín | Daisy (English equivalent); Noneen (anglicisation) | Derived from Latin nōra (hōra). | |
| Nóirín | Noreen, Norene, Norine (anglicisations) | From Latin Honoria. | |
| Nóra | Nora (English equivalent) | From Latin Honoria. | |
| Onóra | Onora (anglicisation), Honora (equivalent) | From Latin Honoria. | |
| Pádraigín | Patricia (English equivalent) | From Latin Patricius. | |
| Peig; Peigí | Peg, Peggy (anglicisations) | Derived from Margaret. | |
| Peigín | Pegeen (anglicisation) | Derived from Margaret. | |
| Póilín | Paula, Pauline (English equivalent) | Derived from Paula. | |
| Ríonann | Rhiannon (English equivalent) | From Welsh Rhiannon. | |
| Rós; Róis(e) | Rose (English equivalent) | Derived from Rose. | |
| Róisín | Rosheen (anglicisation); Rosaleen (English equivalent) | A pet form of Rós. | |
| Seosaimhín | Josephine (English equivalent) | Derived from Josephine. | |
| Síle | Sheila, She(e)lagh (anglicisations); Cecilia (English equivalent) | From Latin Cecilia. | |
| Sinéad | Jane, Janet, Jennifer (English equivalents) | From French Jeanette, ultimately from Hebrew Yôḥānān. | |
| Siobhán | Joan (English equivalent); Shevaun, Shivaun (anglicisations) | From Anglo-Norman Jehane and Jehann. | |
| Sósaidh | Susy, Suzy (English equivalent) | Derived from Susan, ultimately from Hebrew Shoshana. | |
| Stéise | Stacy, Anastasia (English equivalents) | Derived from Anastasia. | |
| Stíofáinín | Stephanie (English equivalent) | Derived from Stephanie. | |
| Súsanna | Susanna (English equivalent) | From Susanna. | |
| Tilde | Tilda (English equivalent) | From Matilda. | |
| Toiréasa; Treasa | Teresa, Theresa, Therese (English equivalents) | Derived from Teresa. | |
| Tríona | Katherine (English equivalent) | From Caitríona. | |

=== Masculine names of foreign origin ===
| Name | Foreign equivalent(s) and/or Anglicisation(s) | Origin | Ref |
|---|---|---|---|
| Ádhamh | Adam (English equivalent) | From Latin Adam. | |
| Adhamhnán | Adamnan (anglicisation) | From Latin Adam. | |
| Ág(h)aistín; Ág(h)uistín | Augustine (English equivalent) | Derived from Augustine. | |
| Aindréas; Aindrias | Andrew (English equivalent) | From Greek Andreas. | |
| Aindriú | Andrew (English equivalent) | From Norman Andreu. | |
| Alastar | Alistair (English equivalent) | From Norman Alexander. | |
| Ambrós | Ambrose (English equivalent) | From Greek Ambrose. | |
| Amhlaoibh | Auliffe (anglicisation); Olaf, Humphrey (English equivalents) | From Old Norse Óláfr. | |
| Anraoi; Anraí | Henry (English equivalent) | Derived from Henry. | |
| Antaine; Antóin; Antoin(e) | Anthony (English equivalent) | Derived from Anthony. | |
| Artúr | Arthur (English equivalent) | Derived from Arthur. | |
| Bearnárd | Bernard (English equivalent) | Derived from Bernard. | |
| Beinidict | Benedict (English equivalent) | From Latin Benedict. | |
| Colm | Columbus (English equivalent) | From Latin Columbus. | |
| Colmán | Colman (anglicisation) | Diminutive of Colm. | |
| Críostóir | Christopher (English equivalent) | Derived from Christopher. | |
| Dáibhí; Dáibhidh | David | From Hebrew David. | |
| Damhnaic | Dominic (English equivalents) | From Latin Dominic. | |
| Éamonn | Edmond, Edwin, Edgar (English equivalents) | Derived from Edmond, Edwin, or Edgar. | |
| Eoin | Owen (anglicisation), John (English equivalent) | From Hebrew Jochanan. | |
| Frainc | Franc, Frank (English equivalents) | Derived from Francis. | |
| Gearóid | Gerald (English equivalent) | Derived from Norman Gerald. | |
| Gréagóir | Gregory (English equivalent) | Derived from Gregory. | |
| Íosac | Isaac (English equivalent) | Derived from Isaac, ultimately from Hebrew Yiẓḥaq. | |
| Labhrás | Laurence, Lawrence (English equivalents) | From Latin Laurentius. Introduced by the Normans. | |
| Liam | | Derived from William. | |
| Máirtín | Martin (English equivalent) | From Latin Martin. | |
| Maitiú | Matthew (English equivalent) | Derived from Matthew, ultimately from Hebrew Matityahu. | |
| Maolcholm | Malcolm (anglicisation) | Derived from Colm. | |
| Maolíosa | Maelisa (anglicisation) | Derived from Jesus. | |
| Mícheál; Mic(í); Míc(í) | Michael, Mick, Micky, Mike, Mikey (English equivalent) | Ultimately from Hebrew Mikha'el. | |
| Muiris | Maurice (English equivalent) | From Maurice. | |
| Nioclás | Nicholas (English equivalent) | From Greek Nicholas. | |
| Nollaig | Noel (English equivalent) | From Latin nātālis. | |
| Oilibhéar | Oliver (English-language equivalent) | Derived from Oliver. | |
| Oistín | Austin (English equivalent) | Derived from Austin. | |
| Pád(h)raig | Patrick (English equivalent) | From Latin Patrick. | |
| Peadar; Peadair | Peter (English equivalent) | From Latin Petrus. | |
| Piaras | Pearse, Pierce, Peter | From Latin Petrus. | |
| Proinsias; Froinsias | Francis (English equivalent) | Derived from Francis. | |
| Pól | Paul (English equivalent) | Derived from Paul. | |
| Risteárd | Richard (English equivalent) | Derived from Richard. | |
| Réamonn | Raymond (English equivalent) | Derived from Raymond. | |
| Roibeard; Roibeárd | Robert (English equivalent) | Derived from Robert. | |
| Seán; Séan | Sean, Shane, Shaun, Shawn, Shayne (anglicisations) | Derived from the Anglo-Norman Jehan, or Modern French Jean; from the Latin Johannes, ultimately derived from the Standard Hebrew Yoḥanan. | |
| Séafra | Geoffrey, Jeffrey (English equivalents) | Derived from Geoffrey. | |
| Séamas; Séamus | James (English equivalent) | Derived from James. | |
| Séarlas | Charles (English equivalent) | Derived from Charles. | |
| Seoirse | George (English equivalent) | From Greek George. | |
| Seosamh | Joseph (English equivalent) | Derived from Joseph, ultimately from Hebrew Yosef. | |
| Síomón; Síomún | Simon (English equivalent) | Derived from Simon, ultimately from Hebrew Simeon. | |
| Steafán; Stiofán | Stephen, Steven (English equivalents) | From Greek Stephen. | |
| Téadóir | Theodore (English equivalent) | From Greek Theodore. | |
| Tiobóid | Theobald (English equivalent) | Derived from Theobald. | |
| Tomás | Thomas (English equivalent) | Derived from Thomas. | |
| Uilliam | William (English equivalent) | From William. | |

== See also ==
- Irish name
- List of Scottish Gaelic given names
- Scottish Gaelic name
