= Fearghal =

Fearghal (Fergal)
- Pronunciation: Irish: Ulster: [ˈfʲaɾˠəgəlˠ] Connacht: [ˈfʲaɾˠiːlˠ] Munster: [fʲaˈɾˠiːlˠ] Scottish Gaelic: [ˈfɛɾɛɣəl]
- Gender: Male

Origin
- Origin: Irish
- Meaning: man of valour
- Region of origin: Ireland, Scotland, Isle of Man

Other names
- Related names: Fergus, Fearghus, Fearghas

Fearghal is an Irish male given name. The name is from the Irish words fear 'man' and gal 'valour', thus the name translates to 'man of valour'. The anglicised form is Fergal or Feargal.

== Historic figures ==
- Fearghal Ó Taidg an Teaghlaigh (died 1226), bodyguard to Cathal Crobhdearg Ua Conchobair
- Fearghal Ó Gadhra (1597–1660), lord of Coolavin
- Fearghal Mág Samhradháin (died 1393), chief of the McGovern clan
- Fearghal mac Catharnach (died 821/823), ruler of Loch Riah
- Virgil of Salzburg, (c. 700 — 27 November 784) Irish bishop churchman and astronomer

== Politics ==
- Fearghal McKinney (born 1962), former deputy leader of the SDLP

== Arts ==
- Fearghal Óg Mac an Bhaird (1550-1616), Gaelic-Irish poet
- Fearghal mac Domhnuill Ruaidh Mac an Bhaird (died 1550), Gaelic-Irish bardic poet
- Fearghal McGarry (born 1971), Irish historian

== Sport ==
- Fearghal Purcell (born 1980), Irish Footballer
- Fearghal Flannery (born 1991), Irish Hurler

== See also ==
- List of Irish-language given names
