= Saoirse =

Saoirse (Irish: [ˈsˠiːɾˠʃə]) is the Irish language word for "freedom" and may refer to:

- Saoirse (given name), an Irish female given name
- Saoirse Irish Freedom, the monthly organ of Republican Sinn Féin
- Saoirse na hÉireann, a small Irish republican paramilitary group
- Saoirse (horse), foaled 1996, Canadian champion racehorse
- Saoirse Abu, foaled 2005, American-bred thoroughbred racehorse and broodmare
- Saoirse, a ketch Edward Conor Marshall O'Brien sailed around the world in 1923–1925
- MV Saoirse, a ship participating in Freedom Flotilla II in 2011

== See also ==
- Seoirse, a given name
