= Cainnech (given name) =

- Gender: unisex
- Name day: 28 January, 11 October

Other gender
- Masculine: Cainneach/Caindeach
- Feminine: Cainneach/Cainnear (Cainder)

Origin
- Origin: Irish
- Meaning: from the Irish word caoin meaning kind, gentle or attractive

Other names
- Variant forms: Caindeach, Cainder

Cainnech (Modern Irish: Coinneach) is an Old Irish given name.

Cainnech appears to have belonged to that class of Irish names which were suitable for both sexes (Flann, Ceallach, Fedelm). Two early male saints bore this name including Cainnech of Aghaboe (515/16–600) and the more obscure Cainnech of Achad Raithin. Several woman have also been recorded with this name.

== Etymology ==
Cainnech or Cainneach comes from the Irish word caoin meaning "kind, gentle, good or attractive." It is related to the female name Cainnear or Cainder which shares a similar etymology and means "kind or gentle daughter" (literally caoin + der in Irish)

== Notable people ==
- Caineach inion Urchadh, Queen of Connacht, fl. early 10th century.
- Cainnech ingen Canannán, Queen of Ireland, died 929.
- Cainnech of Achad Raithin in Munster, a male Irish saint, feast day 28 November.
- Cainnech of Aghaboe a male Irish saint, the patron of Kilkenny

== See also ==
- List of Irish-language given names
