= Fergie =

Fergie or Fergy or Fergee is a short form of the names Fergus, Ferguson, and Fergusson.

It commonly refers to:

- Alex Ferguson (born 1941), Scottish former football manager
- Fergie (singer) (Stacy Ann Ferguson, born 1975), American singer-songwriter, actress, and former member of the Black Eyed Peas
- Sarah Ferguson, formerly Sarah, Duchess of York, (born 1959), British author, philanthropist, television personality, and former wife of the then Prince Andrew, Duke of York

It may also refer to:

== People ==
- Fergie (DJ) (Robert Ferguson, born 1979), Irish DJ and former radio presenter
- Barry Ferguson (born 1978), Scottish football player
- Carl Fergie, American retired professional wrestler
- Christopher Ferguson (born 1961), American astronaut
- Clive Fergie (1895–1960), the Australian rules footballer
- Darren Ferguson (born 1972), Scottish football manager and former player, son of Alex Ferguson
- Dennis Frederiksen (1951–2014), American singer
- Fergie Aitken (1896–1989), Scottish footballer
- Fergie McCormick (1939–2018), New Zealand former rugby union footballer
- Fergie MacDonald (1937–2024), Scottish ceilidh dance band leader
- Fergie Olver (born 1947), Canadian game show host and sportscaster
- Fergie Reid (1849–1924), Australian trade unionist and politician
- Fergie Semple (1922–2003), British Army brigadier and Director SAS
- Fergie Sutherland (1931–2012), Irish horse trainer
- Fergus Suter (1857–1916), Scottish footballer, arguably the first recognised professional footballer
- Ferguson Jenkins (born 1942), Canadian former Major League Baseball pitcher
- Fergy Brown (1923–2013), Canadian politician
- Fergy Malone (1844–1905), American baseball player
- Forest K. Ferguson (1919–1954), American college multi-sport athlete
- Henry G. Ferguson (1882–1966), USGS geologist
- Subhash Gupte (1929–2002), Indian cricketer

== Other uses ==
- The Fergies, an Australian band
- Jack Ferguson Award (the Fergie), Ontario Hockey League ice hockey award
- Fergie Ferguson Award (the Fergie), University of Florida sports award
- Ferguson TE20, an agricultural tractor commonly known as the "Little Grey Fergie"
- Precision Tech Fergy, an ultralight aircraft
- Fergie, a character in the Scottish sitcom Still Game

== See also ==
- Ferg (born 1988), American rapper
- Fergus (disambiguation)
- Ferguson (disambiguation)
- Fergusson (disambiguation)
