= Neven =

Neven may refer to the following articles

- Neven (album), a 2013 album by M-Flo
- Neven (given name), a Slavic masculine name
- Neven Bell, a character from the Monk TV series
- Hartmut Neven (born 1964), German scientist working in computational neurobiology, robotics and computer vision
- Neven, a Serbian newspaper published in the 19th and 20th century

== See also ==
- Nevan, an Irish name
- Neven du Mont (disambiguation)
- William James MacNeven (1763–1841), Irish-American physician, chemist, and writer
