= Tuathflaith =

Irish given name

Tuathfhlaith (Old Irish: Túathflaith) is an Irish language feminine given name. Alternate spellings include Tuathlaith and Tuathla. As the name derives from the male given name Tuathal meaning "ruler of the people", Tuathfhlaith is understood to mean "princess of the people". More specifically, Tuathflaith is composed of the Old Irish elements túath "people, country" and flaith "ruler, sovereign, princess".

== Notable people ==
- Tuathflaith ingen Cathail (more commonly Taileflaith), Queen of Leinster, fl. 728, d. 749-754.

== See also ==
- List of Irish-language given names
