= Fergus =

Fergus may refer to:

== Given name or surname ==
- Fergus (name), including lists of people and fictional and mythological characters

== Places ==
- Fergus, Ontario, Canada
- River Fergus, County Clare, Ireland
- Lake Fergus, South Island, New Zealand
- Loch Fergus, South Ayrshire, Scotland
- Fergus County, Montana, United States

== Other uses ==
- Cyclone Fergus, in the 1996–97 South Pacific cyclone season
- HMCS Fergus, a Royal Canadian Navy Second World War corvette
- USS Fergus, a US Navy attack transport ship of World War II
- Fergus (novel), by Brian Moore
- protagonist of Roman de Fergus, an Arthurian romance probably written at the beginning of the 13th century

== See also ==
- Fergie (disambiguation)
