= Marie O'Riordan =

Irish journalist

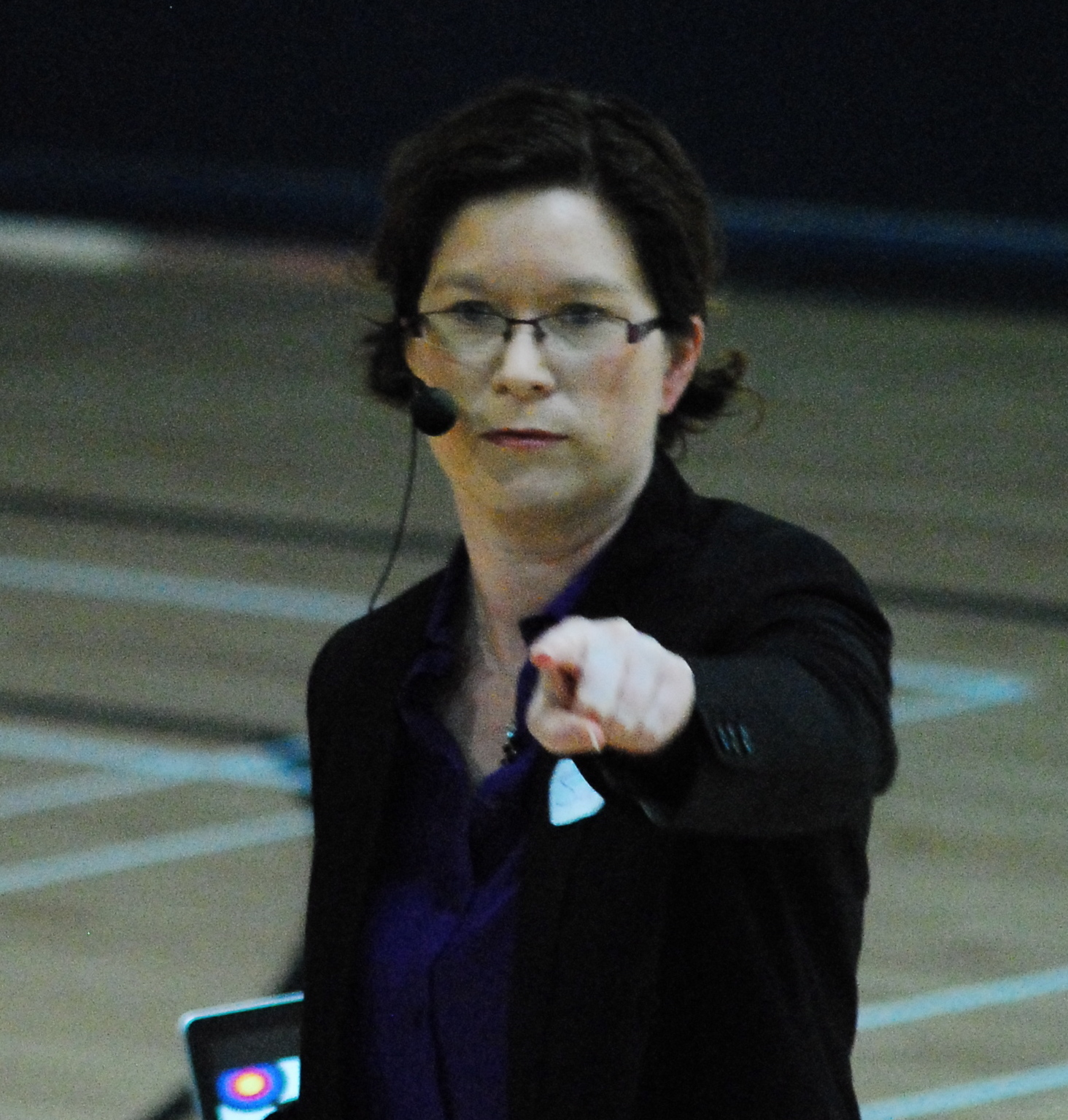
- O'Riordan speaking at University of Limerick Sport Arena in 2012
- Occupations: Journalist; Third World documentaries maker; broadcaster; short filmmaker; mentor; marketing; pr; communications
- Known for: Mother Teresa interview; philanthropy award; short film award; psychology formula; mentoring; savant; polymath; Forbes
- Website: marieoriordan.org

Marie O'Riordan was the final journalist to interview Nobel Peace Prize winner Mother Teresa, Saint Teresa of Calcutta, for a documentary about street children in Calcutta (now Kolkata), India, in 1997, aged 22. The documentary made by the Irish broadcaster called Suffer Little Children aired hours before Mother Teresa died on 5 September 1997.

== Television award ==
O'Riordan won a Sony RTÉ Irish national television short film award for Elaine in Wonderland on 22 December 1990, aged 15. The short film first aired on national television on 17 November 1990.

== Media ==
The global business awards judge appeared on radio and television from the age of 13. She has interviewed Academy Award recipients Paul Newman, Cate Blanchett, Charlize Theron, Michael Caine, Quentin Tarantino and Renée Zellweger. O'Riordan reported on a news story for CNN aged 20. She recorded a documentary with a Holocaust survivor aired in Ireland in 2005. She made a Third World documentary in Africa in 2006 in the Kenyan cities of Nairobi and Mombasa. She was accepted into Forbes Councils in January 2020.

== Psychology formula ==
The social media influencer developed a psychology formula with Dr. Naoisé O'Reilly in 2013, named the Periodic Table of the Development of Results, also known as Purple Success. They specialised in understanding the psychology behind success using a process called Purple Psychology. O'Riordan is an INFJ personality type and has ambidexterity. She was interviewed on national radio in Ireland about having a photographic memory and a sensory processing disorder. Other issues discussed were with regards to the autism spectrum and the LGBTQ community. The mentor and philanthropist founded the Forever Method to help in "humanizing business" advising governments, royal families, Fortune 500 companies, olympians, paralympians, world champion athletes and Hollywood actors.

== Philanthropy award ==
Originally from Croagh, County Limerick, in Ireland, O'Riordan was presented with an honorary philanthropy award in Abu Dhabi, United Arab Emirates for a recycled technology project to educate children in Africa in December 2011.

== Volunteering ==
The first time she left Ireland was to fly to France to volunteer in a hospital during the summer aged 16. That hospital is where a child in her family was cared for before dying of leukaemia at the age of 4. This was the start of O'Riordan's volunteering abroad which led to philanthropy and documentary making in Third World countries. Speaking on RTÉ 2fm Irish national radio, she told presenter Evelyn O'Rourke on the Colm Hayes show Drive By on 28 March 2012 that the seeds for philanthropy were set when she was six years old. That is when she started a bucket list after the deaths of two children in the family aged four and two. In November 2021, she volunteered at an Autism preschool in Pretoria, South Africa. Marie O'Riordan is Autistic. During Pride Month 2022, she won a Gamechanger Progress Champion Award in the U.K. as a diversity, equity and inclusion winner for celebrating diversity and fostering inclusion.

The Irish woman graduated in journalism and radio from college after previously failing higher level English at first attempt in the final exams at school. She sustained second degree burns during a firewalk in the Middle East in 2011. O'Riordan has a medical diagnosis from a neurologist of chronic to acute migraine since birth. She tested negative for COVID-19 after returning to Ireland from South Africa as the Omicron variant was discovered.
