= Doireann =

Doireann is an Irish language feminine given name.

== People named Doireann ==
- Doireann Garrihy (born 1992), Irish social media influencer
- Doireann MacDermott (1923–2024), Irish academic
- Doireann Ní Bhriain (born 1952), Irish radio producer
- Doireann Ní Ghlacáin (born 1993/4), Irish musician, broadcaster and podcaster
- Doireann Ní Ghríofa (born 1981), Irish poet
- Doireann O'Mahony, Irish barrister

== See also ==
- List of Irish-language given names
