= Fergus (name) =

Name list

Fergus or Feargus is a common and one of the oldest known Irish or Scottish male given name derived from Old Irish, meaning "the strong (one)" or "the masculine (one)".

As a surname, Ferguson or Fergusson is common across Scotland but particularly in Perthshire and Ayrshire. In Ireland, the Ferris family of County Kerry derives its surname from the patronymic Ó Fearghusa.

== Given name ==
Fergus (Fearghus)
- Pronunciation: English: /ˈfɜːrɡəs/ Irish: [ˈfʲaɾˠəgəsˠ] Scottish Gaelic: [ˈfɛɾɛɣəs̪]
- Gender: Male

Origin
- Origin: Proto-Celtic
- Meaning: "man-strength, virility".

Other names
- Alternative spelling: Fearghus, Fearghas
- Related names: Fearghal, Fergal, Ferris

=== Saints ===
- Saint Fergus

=== Nobles ===
- Fergus the Great (died c. 645), also known as Gwrgan Fawr or Gurgantius, a king of Ergyng, a Welsh kingdom of the early medieval period
- Fergus mac Echdach, Scottish king of Dál Riata from about 778 to 781
- Fergus of Galloway (died 1161), Lord of Galloway
- Fergus, Earl of Buchan (died before 1214)
- Fergus Morton, Baron Morton of Henryton, judge

=== Politicians ===
- Fergy Brown Canadian politician
- Fergus Ewing (born 1957), Scottish politician
- Fergus Graham (1893–1978), 5th Baronet, British Member of Parliament
- Fergus McAteer, Irish politician
- Fergus Medwin (1874–1934), Australian politician
- Fergus Montgomery (1927–2013), British thrice Member of Parliament
- Fergus O'Brien, Irish politician
- Fergus O'Dowd, Irish politician
- Fergus Ó hÍr, Irish activist, politician, head teacher and broadcaster
- Fergus Smith (1843–1924), Australian politician

=== Writers and academics ===
- Fergus I. M. Craik (born 1935), Scottish cognitive psychologist
- Fergus Hume, novelist
- Fergus Gordon Kerr (born 1931), Scottish Catholic priest, philosopher and theologian
- Fergus Millar (1935–2019), British historian and Oxford professor
- Fergus Pyle (1935–1997), Irish journalist and editor

=== Others ===
- Fergus Bowes-Lyon, brother of the Queen Mother
- Fergus Johnston (born 1959), Irish composer
- Fergus McCreadie (born 1997), Scottish jazz pianist
- Fergus McMaster (1879–1950), Australian businessman and aviation pioneer
- Fergus Riordan, actor
- Feargus Urquhart, Scottish-American video game designer

=== Mythological figures ===
- Fergus I (mythological king), said to be the "first king of Scotland"
- Fergus Dubdétach, legendary High King of Ireland of the 3rd century AD
- Fergus Fortamail, legendary High King of Ireland of the 4th century BC
- Fergus mac Léti, legendary king of Ulster
- Fergus mac Róich, in the Ulster Cycle of Irish mythology
- Fergus Mór, a king of Dál Riata in Scottish mythology
- Fergus Lethderg ("red-side" or "half-red"), a son of Nemed who leads his people against the Fomorians in the Irish Mythological Cycle
- Fergus, son of Eochaid Mugmedon, half-brother of Niall of the Nine Hostages (5th century)
- Sir Fergus, one of King Arthur's Knights of the Round Table in Le Morte d'Arthur

=== Fictional characters ===
- Fergus the Railway Traction Engine, a character in Thomas & Friends
- Fergus Cramer from the Nero Wolfe series
- Claudel "Fergus" Fraser, a supporting character from Outlander, both in the series of novels and the television adaptation
- Fergus Fuzz, a main character in the BBC puppet series The Furchester Hotel
- Fergus Kearney, in the New Zealand soap opera Shortland Street
- Fergus MacLeod, real name of Crowley from the TV series Supernatural
- Fergus McDuck, a Disney character
- Fergus Shannon, a dog in children's books by David Shannon
- King Fergus, the leader of the foxes in the German film Der Stürmer
- King Fergus, father of Princess Merida in the animated film Brave
- Fergus, a child of Shrek in the animated film Shrek Forever After

=== Surname ===
- Alex Fergus (1899–?), Scottish professional association footballer
- Dylan Fergus (b. 1980), American actor
- Greg Fergus (b. 1969), Canadian politician
- Sir Howard Fergus, Montserratian writer and historian
- James Fergus (1813–1902), miner, rancher, businessman and politician in Minnesota and Montana
- John Fergus (politician) (died 1865), British politician
- John Fergus (scholar) (c. 1700–c. 1761), Irish physician and man of letters
- Keith Fergus (b. 1954), American professional golfer
- Oris Fergus, Montserratian cricketer
- Thomas Fergus (1850–1914), New Zealand politician
- Tom Fergus (b. 1962), Canadian-raised American retired National Hockey League player

== See also ==
- List of Scottish Gaelic given names
- List of Irish-language given names
- Ferragus (disambiguation)
