= Bé Fáil =

Bé Fáil was an Old Irish feminine given name used during the medieval period.

== People ==
- Bé Fáil ingen Sechnusaigh, died 741.
- Bé Fáil ingen Cathail, Queen of Ireland, died 798.

== See also ==
- List of Irish-language given names
