= Bean Mhídhe =

Bean Mhídhe was a common Irish language feminine given name used during the medieval period which fell out of use at the start of the 17th century. It was anglicised as Benvy.

== List of people ==
- Bean Mhídhe Ní Mhaoil Seachlainn, died 1137
- Bean Mhídhe Ní Cerbaill, died 1176.
- Bean Mhídhe Ní hEignigh, died 1215.
- Bean Mhídhe Bean Uí Suibhne, died 1269.
- Bean Mhídhe Ní Maghnusa, died 1382.
- Bean Mhídhe Bean Uí Neill Moir, died 1385.
- Bean Mhídhe Ní Glennain, died 1415.
- Bean Mhídhe Ní Conchobair, died 1478.

== See also ==
- List of Irish-language given names
