= Sorcha =

- Pronunciation: English: /ˈsɔːrkə/ Irish: [ˈsˠɔɾˠəxə] Scottish Gaelic: [ˈs̪ɔɾɔxə]
- Gender: Feminine
- Language: Irish and Scottish Gaelic

Origin
- Meaning: "light", "brightness"

Other names
- Alternative spelling: Sorċa

Sorcha is a Gaelic feminine given name. It is common to both the Irish and Scottish Gaelic languages, and is derived from the Old Irish word sorchae, soirche meaning "brightness".

In Scotland, Sorcha has traditionally been Anglicised as Clara, which retains the name's Gaelic meaning: the English Clara is derived from the Latin clarus, meaning "bright", "famous".

The variant pronunciation of this name as /ˈsɔːrʃə/ is due to confusion by English-speakers with Saoirse /ˈsɜːrʃə/, meaning "freedom".

== Notable people with the name Sorcha ==
- Sorcha Boru (1900–2006), American potter
- Sorca Clarke (born 1978/79), Irish politician
- Sorcha Eastwood (born 1985), Northern Irish politician
- Sorcha Cusack (born 1949), Irish actress
- Sorcha Groundsell (born 1998), Scottish actress
- Sorcha MacMahon (1888–1970), Irish nationalist and republican
- Sorca McGrath, Irish musician
- Sorcha Ní Chéide, Irish actress
- Sorcha Ní Ghuairim (1911–1976), Irish teacher, author, Sean-nós singer
- Sorcha Richardson (born 1990), Irish singer-songwriter

== See also ==
- List of Irish-language given names
