= Ailbhe (name) =

Ailbhe (/ˈæl(ə)və/ AL-və; Irish pronunciation: [ˈalʲəvʲə]) is a unisex Irish language given name. It was originally a masculine name, and was frequently anglicised as Albert (a name to which it is etymologically unrelated), but is now more commonly a feminine name.

== Notable people ==
- Ailbhe, another name for Saint Ailbe (died 528)
- Ailbe Ua Maíl Mhuaidh (Albin O'Molloy, died 1223), bishop
- Ailbhe of Ceann Mhara (died 814), cleric
- Ailbhe Nic Giolla Bhrighde, Irish screenwriter and author
- Ailbhe Darcy (born 1981), Irish poet
- Ailbhe Garrihy, Irish social media influencer
- Ailbhe Ní Ghearbhuigh (born 1984), poet
- Ailbhe Mac Shamhráin (1954–2011), historian and Celticist
- Ailbhe McDonagh (born 1982), Irish concert cellist and composer
- Ailbhe Reddy (born 1991), folk singer
- Ailbhe Smyth (born 1946), academic, feminist, and LGBTQ activist
- Ailbe, the dog in The Tale of Mac Da Thó's Pig

== See also ==
- List of Irish-language given names
- John Ailbe O'Hara, Judge of the High Court of Justice in Northern Ireland
