= Féilim =

Féilim or Feidhlim, is an Irish language masculine given name. The name is derived from the older form Feidhlimidh (Old Irish: Fedlimid). Féilim has been variously anglicised as Felim, Phelim, Feilmy, Philip or Felix.

== List of people ==
=== Feidlimid ===
- Feidlimid mac Coirpri Chruimm (d. 596?), perhaps king of Munster
- Feidlimid mac Cremthanin (d. 846), king of Munster
- Fedlimid mac Daill (also Feidhlimidh Mac Daill, or Felim mac Dall), a bard of the Irish mythology, father of Deirdre
- Feidlimid mac Óengusa (d. c. 500?), king of Munster
- Feidlimid mac Tigernaig (d. 588?), perhaps king of Munster
- Fedlimid Rechtmar

=== Féilim ===
- Saint Felim (also spelled Feidlimid, Feidhlimidh, Felimy, Feidhilmethie, Feidlimthe, Fedlimid, Fedlimidh, Phelim, or Phelime), an Irish hermit and priest of the mid sixth century
- Felim Ua Conchobair (also Felim mac Cathal Crobderg Ua Conchobair), king of Connacht between 1233 and 1265
- Aedh mac Felim Ó Conchobair, his son and king of Connacht between 1265 and 1274
- Aedh Muimhnech mac Felim Ua Conchobair, king of Connacht between 1274 and 1280
- Felim, Feilim or Fedlim Ó Conchobair, king of Connacht between 1310 and 1316
- Felim McFiach O'Byrne, a Gaelic chieftain died in 1630
- Felim O'Neill of Kinard (also Phelim MacShane O'Neill, or Féilim Ó Néill), Irish catholic nobleman leader of the Irish Rebellion of 1641 and executed during the Cromwellian conquest of Ireland in 1652
- Felim Egan, Irish painter born in 1952

It is also used for:

- Fedlimid mac Daill (also Feidhlimidh Mac Daill, or Felim mac Dall), a bard of the Irish mythology, father of Deirdre
- Cavan Cathedral, consacred as Cathedral of Saint Patrick and Saint Felim
- Slieve Felim Mountains (Irish: Sliabh Eibhlinne), mountain range in Ireland in County Limerick
- Slieve Felim Way, a long-distance trail in Ireland between Murroe in County Limerick and Silvermine Mountains in County Tipperary.

=== Phelim ===
- Phelim (Felix) O'Neill (died 1709), head of the Clanaboy O'Neill dynasty, and Chief of this Catholic Lineage
- Phelim Boyle (born 1941), professor of finance in the School of Business and Economics at Wilfrid Laurier University in Canada
- Phelim Calleary (1895–1974), Irish Fianna Fáil politician
- Phelim Caoch O'Neill (also Phelim Caoch Ó Neill, or Feidhlimidh Caoch Ó Néill), Prince of the Cenél nEógain from 1517 to 1542
- Phelim Drew (born 1969), Irish actor
- Phelim McDermott (born 1963), English actor and stage director
- Phelim O'Neill, 2nd Baron Rathcavan (1909–1994), politician in Northern Ireland and a hereditary peer in the British House of Lords

== See also ==
- Fidelma
- List of Irish-language given names
