= Gofraidh mac Briain Mac an Bhaird =

Gofraidh mac Briain Mac an Bhaird, Gaelic-Irish bardic poet, fl. 16th-century.

A member of the Mac an Bhaird family of professional poets, Gofraidh is known from three surviving poems, Lámh indiu im thionnsgnamh, a Thríonóid, Dairt sonn dá seoladh go Tadhg and Doirbh don chéidsheal cinneamhuin tairngeartaigh.
