= Ferguson River =

Ferguson River may refer to:

- Ferguson River (Nunavut), Canada
- Ferguson River (Western Australia)

== See also ==
- Ferguson (disambiguation)
