= Derbforgaill (given name) =

Derbforgaill, Dearbhfhorgaill or Dearbhfhorghaill may refer to:

- Derbforgaill (1st century BC), wife of Lugaid Riab nDerg
- Der Forgaill, died 684.
- Derbfhorgaill, Princess of Leinster, died 1080.
- Derbforgaill ingen Teige, Queen of Ireland, died 1098.
- Derbforgaill Ní Lochlainn, Queen of Connacht, died 1151.
- Derbforgaill Ní Flainn, died 1176.
- Derbforgaill, Princess of Midhe, 1108-1193.
- Derbforgaill Ní Dubhda, Princess of Uí Fiachrach Muaidhe, died 1265.
- Dervorguilla of Galloway, c. 1210-1290
- Derbforgaill Ní Flionn Esa, died 1296.
- Derbforgaill Ní Conchobair, died 1314.
- Derbforgaill Ní Chonchobair, died 1351.
- Derbforgaill Ní Fherghail, died 1355.
- Derbforgaill Ní Conchobair Ruaid, died 1385.
- Derbforgaill Ní Conchobair Duinn, died 1476.
- Derval O'Rourke, Irish athlete, born 1981.

== See also ==
- List of Irish-language given names
