= Cerball =

Cerball (modern spelling: Cearbhall) is an Irish language male given name and may refer to:

- Cerball mac Dúnlainge (died 888), King of Osraige
- Cerball mac Muirecáin (died 909), King of Leinster
- Cearbhall Óg Ó Dálaigh (fl. 1630), poet
- Cearbhall Ó Dálaigh (1911–1978), President of Ireland

== See also ==
- List of Irish-language given names
