= Síthmaith =

Female given name

Síthmaith (Modern Irish: Síothmhaith or Síomha) is an Irish-language feminine given name derived from Irish síth 'peace' and maith 'good'.

The name Síthmaith was used in early medieval Ireland. Síthmaith of Clonboreann (died 771) was an attested bearer of the name. It translates as good spirit.

== See also ==
- List of Irish-language given names
- Irish language revivalism
