= Muirgheas =

- Muirgheas in a Gaelic type, note the lenited g in the name (gh) once appeared in Irish orthography with a dot above it, as pictured.
- Gender: Masculine
- Language: Irish

Origin
- Language: Irish
- Derivation: muir + gus
- Meaning: "sea" + "choice"

Other names
- Anglicisation: Maurice
- See also: Muiris

Muirgheas (Post reform spelling: Muiríos) is a masculine given name in the Irish language. The name is composed of two elements: the first, muir, means "sea"; the second element, gus, means "choice". The name has been Anglicised to the etymologically unrelated Maurice. A contracted form of the name is Muiris (which is also a form of Maurice in Irish).

== People with the name ==
- Muirgheas mac Aedh, (died 1021), Irish, king of Uí Díarmata
- Muirgheas Ua Cú Ceannainn, (died 1106), Irish, king of Uí Díarmata
- Muirgheas Ua hEidhin, (died 1180), Irish, king of Uí Fiachrach Aidhne

== See also ==
- List of Irish-language given names
