= Dáithí =

Dáithí or Daithí (Irish pronunciation: [ˈd̪ˠaːhiː]; Old Irish: Dathí), sometimes also anglicised without diacritics as Daithi, is an Irish male given name which means swiftness or nimbleness. An Icelandic equivalent is Daði.

Notable people and characters with this name include:

- Daithí Burke (born 1992), Irish hurler
- Daithí Carroll (born 1987), Irish Gaelic footballer
- Daithí Casey (born 1990), Irish Gaelic footballer
- Daithí Cooney (born 1954), Irish hurler
- Daithi De Nogla (born 1992), Irish YouTuber
- Daithí Doolan (born 1968), Irish politician
- Daithí Hand, hurling manager
- Daithí Holohan (born 1956), Irish artist
- Dáithí Lacha, main character of a homonymous Irish language television cartoon series
- Daithí McKay (born 1982), Irish politician
- Dáithí Ó Conaill (1938–1991), Irish politician
- Daithí Ó Drónaí (born 1990), Irish musician
- Daithí Ó Muirí, Irish writer
- Dáithí Ó Sé (born 1976), Irish television presenter
- Daithí Regan (born 1968), Irish hurler
- Dáithí Sproule (born 1950), Irish musician
- Nath Í mac Fiachrach, known as Dathí (d.c.445)

== See also ==
- List of Irish-language given names
