= Fintan =

Fintan is an Irish given name. In Irish mythology, Fintan mac Bóchra is said to be the sole survivor of the Great Flood on the island of Ireland, subsequently becoming a personification of old age and knowledge. As a shapeshifter, he appears to be identical to the Salmon of Wisdom and the name may thus have deeper roots in Celtic mythology. The mythical figure is probably the source for the use of the name in medieval and modern times.

Notable persons with this name include:

== Middle Ages ==
- Fintan of Clonenagh (c. 526–603), Irish saint, abbot, monk and hermit
- Fintán of Taghmon (died 635), Irish saint, abbot and abbey founder
- Fintan of Rheinau (803/4–878), Irish saint and hermit

== Modern world ==
- Fintan Connolly, Irish film-maker
- Fintan Coogan Snr (1910–1985), Irish Fine Gael politician
- Fintan Coogan Jnr (born 1944), Irish Fine Gael politician
- Fintan Cullen (born 1954), Irish writer and academic
- Fintan Kilbride (1927–2006), Irish priest
- Fintan McAllister (born 1987), Irish cricketer
- Fintan Mundwiler (1835–1898), Swiss Benedictine abbot
- Fintan O'Toole (born 1958), Irish columnist, writer, literary editor and drama critic
- Fintan Ryan, British scriptwriter
- Fintan Walsh (died 2023), Irish Gaelic football player
- Fintan Warfield (born 1992), Irish Sinn Féin politician

== Fictional characters ==
- Fintan Pyren, an unstable villainous murderer in the book series Keeper of The Lost Cities by Shannon Messenger
