= Pegeen =

Pegeen is the anglicized spelling of Peigín, an Irish given name meaning "little Peig" or "little Margaret", and may refer to:

== People ==
- Brigit Pegeen Kelly (1951–2016), American poet
- Pegeen Fitzgerald (1904–1989) American radio personality
- Pegeen Hanrahan (born circa 1966), mayor of Gainesville, Florida
- Pegeen Vail Guggenheim (1925–1967), American painter, daughter of art collector Peggy Guggenheim

== Other ==
- Margaret "Pegeen" Flaherty, character in Irish playwright John Millington Synge's The Playboy of the Western World (1907)
- Pegeen (film), 1920 American film starring Bessie Love
- "Peigín Leitir Móir", Irish folk song published in 1911

== See also ==
- Peggy (given name)
- List of Irish-language given names
