= Annaghdown Abbey =

Coordinates: 53.386994°N 9.072593°W

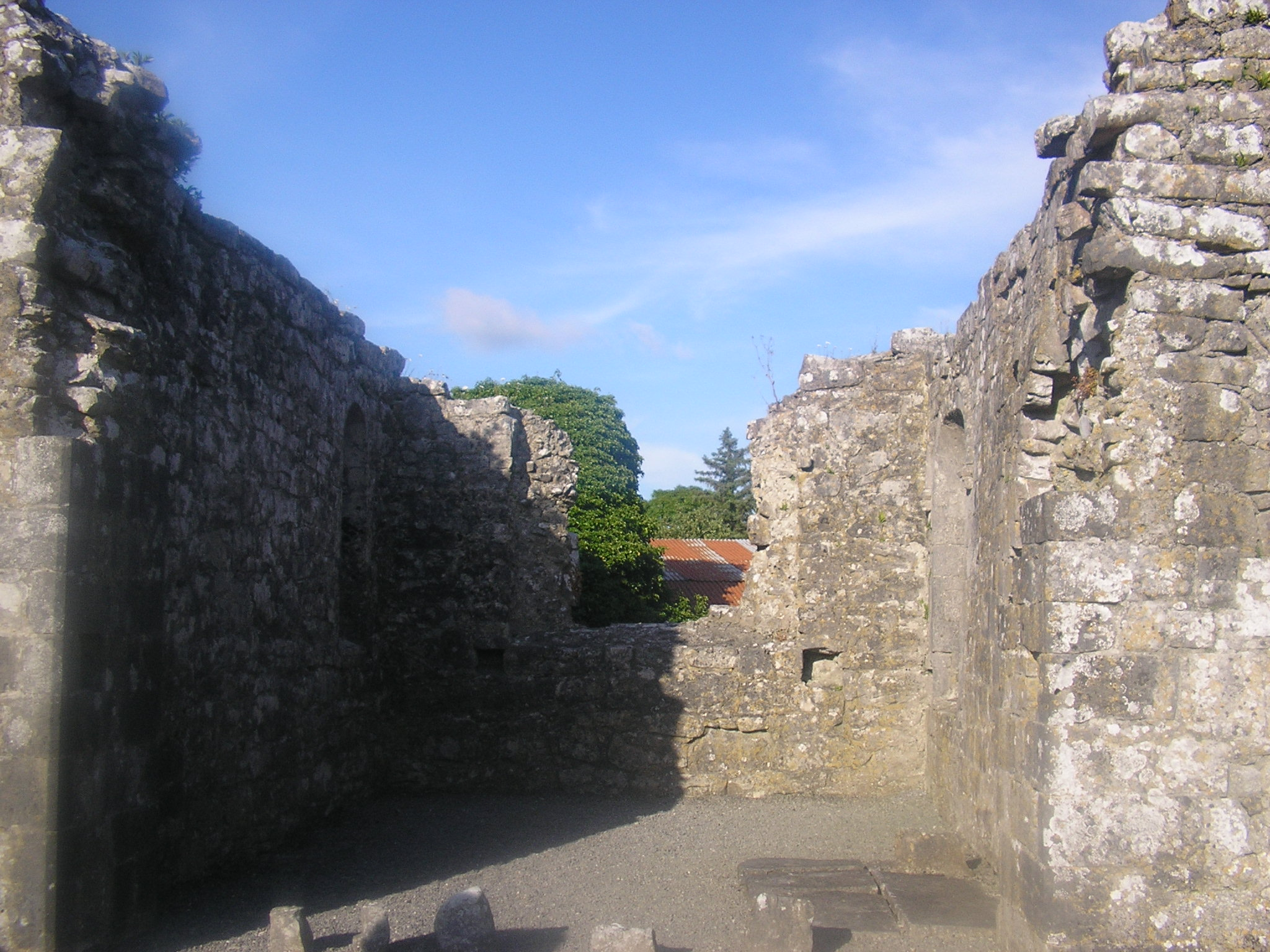
East window of the choir of Annaghdown Abbey

Annaghdown Abbey (full title: the Abbey of St Mary de Portu Patrum but also commonly known as Annaghdown Priory) is a ruined house of the Arroasian canons in the townland of Annaghdown, County Galway, Ireland.

The site was probably founded by Turlough O'Conor around 1140 and dissolved after the Reformation in 1562 (see Reformation in Ireland). The remaining ruins include a church, a cloister and living quarters. Some details of the windows suggest that they were constructed in the 13th century while the south window of the choir is in the transitional style from c. 1200. As the east window itself appears to be missing and the east window of Annaghdown Cathedral, 110 metres (360 ft) in a south-east direction, is of a similar period, it is possible that it was moved to the cathedral. Author Peter Harbison posits that the perfect fit of the east window of the cathedral does not make a late move likely. The ruins of Annaghdown Abbey are a National Monument.

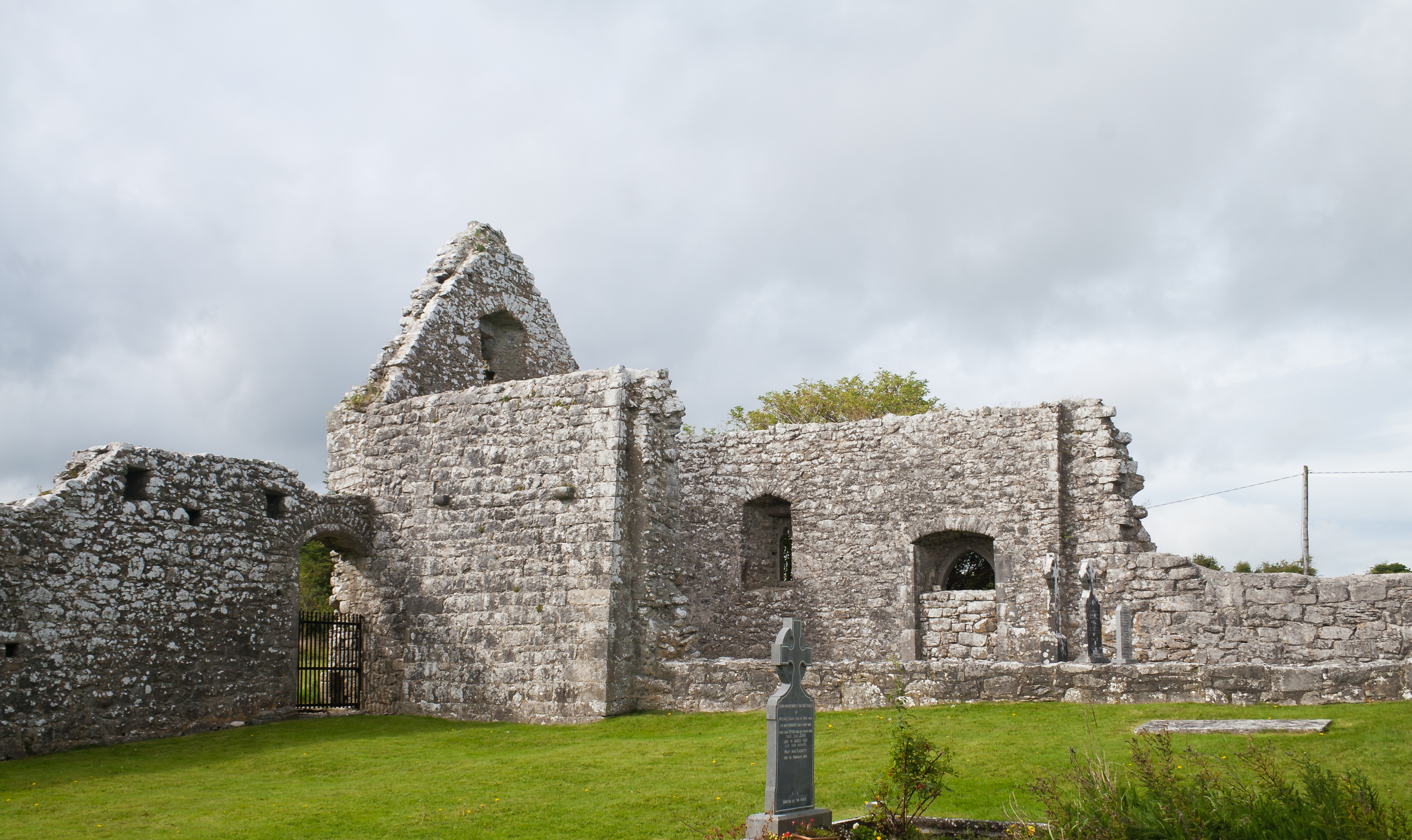
Annaghdown Abbey of St. Mary de Portu Patrum View from the Cloister to the Nave 2010 09 12

== See also ==
- Annaghdown
- Bishop of Annaghdown
