= Eoghan Mac an Bhaird =

Irish poet

Eoghan Mac an Bhaird (fl. between 1200 and 1600) was an Irish poet.

Eoghan was a member of the Mac an Bhaird family of professional poets during the era of High Medieval Ireland.

Composer of the bardic poem, Leannáin fileadh síol Suibhne, consisting of one hundred and ninety-two lines. No other extant poems can be attributed to him.

Its first twelve lines are as follows:

Leannáin fileadh síol Suibhne
treoin nach tráigh le cianchuimhne
caor shlóigh ren doiligh deabhaidh,
róimh an oinigh d'oileamhain.
Lóchrainn oinigh Éireann Cuinn,
sliocht an Athlamháin áluinn,
an táin ó Thulaigh na n-Art,
curaidh gan ghráin re nguasocht.
Ní chlaochlóidh cuing a n-oinigh
s iad don éigse as fhóiridhin
ioldánaigh gan oil 'n-a gceann
le goimh iombádhaidh Éireann.
