= Nollaig (given name) =

- Gender: Unisex
- Language: Irish

Origin
- Meaning: "Christmas"

Nollaig is an Irish language unisex given name. Originating from the Latin for Christmas, it is the equivalent to English Noel or Noelle.

== People named Nollaig ==
=== Female ===
- Nollaig Casey, Irish fiddle player
- Nollaig Cleary (born 1981), Irish Gaelic football player

=== Male ===
- Nollaig Ó Muraíle, Irish scholar
- Nollaig Ó Gadhra (1943–2008), Irish language activist
- Noel 'Nollaig' Bridgeman (1946–2021), Irish musician

== See also ==
- List of Irish-language given names
