= Ferguson =

Ferguson may refer to:

== Places ==
=== Australia ===
- Ferguson, Western Australia, a locality in the Shire of Dardanup

=== Canada ===
- Ferguson, British Columbia
- Mount Ferguson (Ontario), a mountain in Temagami, Ontario
- Ferguson Highway, in Northern Ontario
- Ferguson Avenue, Hamilton, Ontario

=== United States ===
- Ferguson, Arkansas
- Ferguson, Iowa
- Ferguson, Kentucky
- Ferguson, Missouri
- Ferguson, South Carolina, a ghost town
- Ferguson, West Virginia

== People ==
- Ferguson (name)

== Brands and enterprises ==
- Ferguson Company, also known as the Ferguson-Brown Company, a tractor manufacturer
  - Ferguson TE20, a tractor
- Ferguson Electronics, previously known as Ferguson Radio Corporation
- Ferguson Enterprises and its defunct affiliate Ferguson plc, a plumbing and builder products wholesaler
- Ferguson Publishing, an imprint of Infobase Publishing
- Ferguson Research, a racecar constructor
- Ferguson rifle
- Ferguson Marine

== Other uses ==
- Jack Ferguson Award, Ontario Hockey League ice hockey award
- Fergie Ferguson Award, University of Florida sports award
- Ferguson Center for the Arts
- Ferguson unrest, protests and civil disorder following the 2014 shooting of Michael Brown in Ferguson, Missouri
- Our Lady of Ferguson, Christian icon of the Virgin Mary
- Plessy v. Ferguson, 163 U.S. 537 (1896), a landmark U.S. Supreme Court decision that upheld the constitutionality of the "separate but equal" segregation doctrine

== See also ==
- Fergie (disambiguation)
- Ferguson River (disambiguation)
- Fergusson (disambiguation)
