= Mac an Bhaird =

The Mac an Bháird family (Irish: Clann an Bháird) was one of the learned families of late medieval Ireland. The name has evolved over many centuries, the anglicised forms coming down as MacAward, McWard, MacEward, MacEvard, Macanward, M'Ward, and its most commonly used variant today: Ward. The name means 'son of the bard' and has no connection with the English name Ward, which originated from the Saxon word weard meaning watchman or guardian. Additionally, considerable numbers of Latin, French, and Spanish variants can be found in Continental records: Vardeo, Bardeo, U Bart, Wardeum, Vyardes, Wardeus, not to mention Verdaeorum familiae: the Ward family.

== Ancestry ==
The origin of the Mac an Bháird septs lay in the province of Ulster. Possibly as early as the third century AD, they migrated to the province of Connacht as one of the tribes of the six Soghain, under the leadership of Eocha, a son of Sodhán Salbhuidhe na Sreath – Sogan of the Battle-lines, or Sogan of the Preys – who in turn was the son of Fiacha Araidhe, a third-century king of Ulster and a direct ancestor of all the Wards of Ireland. They were one of the leading clans of the Soghain in what is now County Galway and were based at Muine Casáin (or Muine an Chasáin) in the modern parish of Ballymacward (Baile Mhic an Bháird) in that county, in a territory known as Uí Maine. This is the parent sept of all Mac an Bháird septs. Eventually, as many as seven branches of the sept may have established themselves in this area, though only two of them are known today. They were frequently employed as bards by the O'Kellys and O'Conors, a profession that would become a hereditary right, as it was with others of Ireland's learned classes in such fields as law, history, and medicine.

== Leabhar Ua Maine ==
Twenty-four generations of the family are recounted in Leabhar Ua Maine (also called the Book of the O'Kellys), extending back to quasi-historical and mythological times. This work was compiled c. 1380, a massive, oversized vellum book written in Irish, for Muircertach ua Ceallaigh (O'Kelly), Bishop of Clonfert from 1378 to 1394. Also found in this work are quatrains paying tribute to the long reign and continuing prosperity of the Uí Dhiarmada (i.e., the descendants of Diarmuid Mac an Bháird), praising the Mac an Bháirds in their capacity as Chiefs of Cinél Rechta, one of the six Sodhán tribes. Rendered into English, it reads: "Though long has been their honorable possession of their patrimony, that domain still rests with the house of Uí Dhiarmada." The next quatrain tells us: "Chiefs of Cinél Rechta of lasting fame are the strong Uí Dhiarmada, the race of the bard, the well-armed stern warriors of Ulster descent."

== "Cruas connacht clanna sogain" ==
The succeeding Mac an Bháird generations are listed in "cruas connacht clanna sogain" ("rigorous Connacht family of the Sogan"), describing the ancient tradition that the Sodháin are descended from Conaill Cearnach, the great mythological hero of Ulster's Knights of the Red Branch, and three of his descendants, one of whom is Sodhán Salbhuidhe, just as they leave Ulster. In this version of the family's descent, Sodhán's son eventually settles the tribes in Connacht, where they are given land by the legendary (and probably mythological) Queen Maeve. The poem continues, praising the "brownish, fair-haired" Mac an Bháirds as trustworthy and loyal, while their gatherings are occasion for the chief of the name to be surrounded "by his fearless, active, well-armed, genial band."

Counting backwards from the chief of the name at the time the poem was written (Seán Mac an Bháird, about 1370 AD), the genealogy continues to the beginning of the tenth century, providing historical documentation for the original Mac an Bháird sept to about the year 900. Continuing back, it records various mythological and quasi-historical ancestors, particularly useful because it substantiates the ancient tradition that the Mac an Bháirds are not descended from Maine Mór, a Munster king from whom the Uí Maine tribe was named, nor the Gaels. Quite possibly they are descended from a pre-Gaelic Celtic tribe, the Picts, Cruitháin, or Érainn – they may all be the same tribe – anciently settled in Ireland. The same poem refers to three branches of the Mac an Bháirds within this general territory. One of them was located near Ballymacward, at Annagh. Of the other two, only speculation is possible. Flynn surmises one of them was probably the branch residing at Cooloortan in Abbeyknockmoy, and the third may conceivably have been a branch of the sept continued in the MacWards of Doon.

The poem continues, exhorting Seán Mac an Bháird to hold on to "the gladsome region handed down through twenty generations" into which the foreigners, so the poet boasts, never set foot.

In addition to their great skills as composers in bardic verse, it was recorded around the eleventh century their noted expertise as keepers of the horse for the Uí Maine chieftains. The duties of the keepers of the horse were apparently shared by all the members of the Uí Maine stemming from the "race of Sodhán." It was a position of high honour at a time when frequent dynastic wars and tribal feuds necessitated regional princes having their war equipment at the ready, not least their prestigious household cavalry. It was an office they held for many years before it was recorded by the eleventh century scribe.

== The first Mac an Bháirds ==
The first of the family to adopt Mac an Bháird as a surname was Eoghan Mac an Bháird, sometime around the eleventh century, most likely in tribute to a noted ancestor. The first written reference to the Mac an Bháirds historically seems to be a death notice for the famous Maol Íosa Mac an Bháird (d. 1173), a renowned bishop of Uí Maine. Numerous entries for other members of the various Mac an Bháird septs can be found in the Irish annals, but especially within the Annals of the Kingdom of Ireland (Annala Rioghachta Éireann), compiled by The Four Masters in Donegal in the 1630s. Nearly forty entries for the name appear in this work, spanning a period of five hundred twenty years. In collaboration with Micheál Ó Cléirigh and his team of scholars in Ireland, the entire effort was supervised by Father Hugh Ward (Aedh Mac an Bháird), rector and guardian of the great Irish College of St. Anthony in Louvain, the Spanish Netherlands (modern Belgium), and the most important Irish publishing center in Europe for nearly fifty years. Indeed, Dr. William Reeves, the late nineteenth century Bishop of Down, Connor and Dromore and a noted Irish scholar himself, considered Hugh Ward to be the founder of Irish archaeology. Many other entries for Mac an Bháirds are recorded in the Annals of Tigernach, the Annals of Loch Cé, the Annals of Connaught, and the Annals of Ulster.

== Late medieval times ==
By the fifteenth century, the Mac an Bháirds had branched out from Galway and established new septs in Tirconnell (Tír Conaill) near Lettermacaward, County Donegal – the most prolific of all the Mac an Bháird septs – and in a nearby area called Tirhugh (Tír Aodh). Other branches of the family formed new septs near Ballymote, County Sligo, and in the territory of Oriel, near Farney, County Monaghan. Many references are recorded for Mac an Bháirds who were their septs' chief of the name. The Tirconnell sept provided the O'Donnells with some of Ireland's greatest bardic poets, while other Mac an Bháird poets and their works are associated with the O'Neills, the Maguries, the MacMahons, and a variety of other Irish and Anglo-Irish chieftains. Perhaps the last of the family's great bardic poets was Pádraig Óg Mac an Bháird, who composed his works towards the end of the seventeenth century.

Eoghan Ruadh Mac an Bhaird, who left Ireland in 1607 with his patron, Rory O'Donnell, during the event known as "the Flight of the Earls", wrote what many consider to be the finest elegiac poem in the Irish language: A bhean fuair faill ar an bhfeart, rendered into an English-language version by Mangan that he called Lament for the Earls of Tyrone and Tyrconnell.

The last Mac an Bháird chief of the name to be recognised by the English, Aedh Mac an Bháird in Galway, died in 1592, though others continued as chief of the name until at least 1668. These Mac an Bháird chieftains retained residences in three different castles in the area during the early- and mid-seventeenth century, at Ballymacward, Carrowantanny, and in the village of Annagh. Their last castle was the one in Annagh, whose remnants were demolished some years ago. The area today is called Castle Park.

== Mac an Bháirds abroad ==
Other Mac an Bháirds of note include Conchobhar Mac an Bháird (d. c. 1641), most often known by his religious name, Cornelius. A Franciscan based in Louvain, he endured great hardships as part of a Counter-Reformation mission to seventeenth century Scotland. In the eighteenth century we find Tomás Mac an Bháird, born in Dublin in 1749 and educated at the Collège des Irlandais in Paris, whose distinguished career with the Irish Brigade in the Service of France under the French King Louis XVI earned him promotion to the rank of General in the French Army. Despite his loyal service to the struggling new French Republic after the Revolution began in 1789, Irish military men were always suspected of harbouring royalist sympathies. General Ward was arrested and imprisoned on 10 October 1793 along with his valet, John Mallone of Limerick. They were tried by the revolutionary tribunal, condemned, and sent to the guillotine in 1794.

In Scotland during the 1800s when Irish immigrants came to find work during the famine. Facing a hostile Presbyterian work culture where most employers would not hire Catholics the McWard's found it easier to find employment by abbreviating their names to Ward.

In the Americas, two Wards in the nineteenth century make an interesting contrast. In Texas, listed as a defender of the Alamo in 1836, is "William Ward of Ireland," his name being inscribed on a monument to the Alamo dead in San Antonio. Just over a decade later, in the Mexican–American War of the 1840s, one Edward Ward fought with the St. Patrick's Battalion of the Mexican Army – El Batallón San Patricios – a hard-fighting unit composed mostly of recent Irish and German immigrants to the United States who, for various reasons (often as a result of religious discrimination within the American army), gave their allegiance to the Mexican state.

== Notable poets ==
- Aodh Mac an Bháird, d.1635
- Aodh mac Diarmada Mac an Bhaird
- Conchobhar Mac an Bháird (Cornelius Ward)
- Diarmaid Mac an Bhaird
- Eoghan Mac an Bhaird
- Eoghan Ruadh Mac an Bhaird
- Fearghal Óg Mac an Bhaird
- Fearghail mheic Dhomhnaill Ruaidh Mac an Bhaird
- Giolla Padraicc Mac an Bhaird Airghiall
- Gofraidh mac Briain Mac an Bhaird
- Laoisioch Mac an Bhaird
- Maolmuire mac Cú Uladh Mac an Bháird
- Pádraig Óg Mac an Bháird
- Uilliam Óg Mac an Bháird

== Sources ==
- The Alamo Reader: A Study in History; ed. Todd Hansen; Mechanicsburg, Pennsylvania: Stackpole Books, 2003
- Annals of Connacht/Annála Connachta; ed. A. Martin Freeman; Dublin: The Dublin Institute for Advanced Studies, 1983
- Annals of the Kingdom of Ireland/Annála Ríoghachta Éireann—From the Earliest Period to the Year 1616 (7 Vols.); The Four Masters, ed. John O’Donovan; New York: AMS Press, Inc., 1966
- Annals of Loch Cé/Annála Locha Cé: A Chronicle of Irish Affairs from A.D. 1014 to A.D. 1590 (2 Vols.); ed. William M. Hennessy; Dublin: Éamonn de Búrca Publications, 2000
- Annals of Tigernach (2 Vols.); ed. Whitley Stokes; Dyfed: Llanerch Publishing, 1993
- Annals of Ulster/Annála Uladh (Annála Senait) (4 Vols.); ed. Seán Mac Airt; Dublin: Éamonn de Búrca, 1998
- Ballymacward – The Story of an East Galway Parish; John S. Flynn; Naas: Leinster Leader, Ltd., 1991
- Book of Hy Many (Leabhar Uí Maine) also known as the Book of the O'Kellys; R.A.S. Macalister; Dublin: Stationery Office of Éire, for the Irish Manuscripts Commission, 1942
- The Irish Franciscan Mission to Scotland, 1619–1646; ed. Cathaldus Giblin, OFM; Dublin: Assisi Press, 1964
- The Louvain Papers 1606–1827; edd. Brendan Jennings and Cathaldus Giblin; Baile Átha Cliath: Coimisiún Láunghscríbhinní na hÉireann, 1968
- Origins and Early History of the Ward Family in Ireland; Tadhg B. Mac an Bháird; Anoka, Minnesota: unpublished manuscript, 2002
- Oxford Concise Companion to Irish Literature, Robert Welsh, 1996. ISBN 0-19-280080-9
- Shamrock and Sword: the St. Patrick's Battalion in the US-Mexican War; Robert Ryal Miller; Norman, Oklahoma: University of Oklahoma Press, 1989
- The Wadding Papers, 1614–1638; ed. Brendan Jennings; Dublin: Irish Manuscript Commission, 1953
