= Barrdhubh =

Barrdhubh is an Irish language feminine given name, meaning dark headed or dark haired.

== Notable people ==
- Barrdhubh Ní Ruairc, died 1373.
- Barrdhubh Ní Findbairr, died 1418.
- Barrdhubh Ní Ruairc, died 1431.
- Barrdhubh Ní Fhialain, died 1478.
- Barrdhubh Ó Dufaigh, born 1997.

== See also ==
- List of Irish-language given names
