= Lorcan =

Lorcan (Irish: Lorcán) is a male given name, meaning 'little fierce one', and may refer to:

- Lorcan Allen (born 1940), Irish farmer and former Fianna Fáil Teachta Dála TD
- Lorcan Cranitch (born 1959), Irish actor
- Lorcan Dempsey (born 1958), the Vice President and Chief Strategist of the Online Computer Library Center (OCLC)
- Lorcán mac Cellaig (flourished 848), King of Leinster of the Uí Muiredaig sept of the Uí Dúnlainge branch of the Laigin
- Lorcán mac Fáelán, the seventh of ten Kings of Leinster to be inaugurated and based on Lyons Hill, Ardclough, County Kildare
- Lorcán Ó Muireadais (1883–1941), Irish Roman Catholic priest, Irish language educator and nationalist activist
- Lorcan O'Herlihy (born 1959), architect
- Lorcán Ua Tuathail (1128–1180), Saint Laurence O'Toole, canonized in 1225 by Pope Honorius III

== See also ==
- List of Irish-language given names
