= Fíneamhain =

Fíneamhain was an Irish language feminine given name used during the medieval period. It was recorded in three instances in the 14th and 15th century Irish annals.

In The Gaelic Names for Plants (Cameron) the word Fíneamhain translates as S. viminalis:

Osier willow; cooper's willow. The Gaelic and Irish: fíneamhain (from fin, vine; and muin, a neck), a long twig—a name also applied to the vine. Vimen in Latin means also a pliant twig, a switch osier. One of the seven hills of Rome (Viminalis Collis) was so named from a willow copse that stood there; and Jupiter, who was worshipped among these willows, was called "Viminius;" and his priests, and those of Mars, were called Salii for the same reason. The worship was frequently of a sensual character, and thus the willow has become associated with lust, filthiness. Priapus was sarcastically called "Salacissimus Jupiter," hence salax, lustful, salacious; and in Gaelic, salach (from sal); German, sal, polluted, defiled. The osier is also called bunsag, bun, a stump, a stock. Maothan, from maoth, smooth, tender. Gall sheilcach, the foreign willow.

== People ==
- Fíneamhain Ní Eogain, died 1387.
- Fíneamhain Ní Manchain, died 1419.
- Fíneamhain Ní Tomais, died 1446.

== See also ==
- List of Irish-language given names
