= Lasairfhíona (name) =

Female given name of Irish language origin

Lasairfhíona (Irish pronunciation: [ˈl̪ˠasˠəɾʲˌiːnˠə]), is an Irish language feminine given name. The name means "wine flame" or "flame of wine" as it derives from the Irish words lasair meaning "flame" and fhíona, the lenited genitive form of fíon meaning "wine". The "fh" combination is silent in Irish and spelling variations of this name also include Lasairíona.

== People ==
There are eleven individuals recorded with the name in the extant Irish annals - three of these sharing the surname Ní Conchobair (or a variant spelling). The earliest example is found under the year 1239 in the Annals of Connacht.

The name was still widely in use in the 1920s in Ireland when Reverend Woulfe compiled his book "Irish Names and Surnames". It continues to be used today, such as by the singer Lasairfhíona. However, the name is not widespread and has not featured in the Central Statistics Office lists of baby names since searchable records since 1964 (years where less than three children with the same name are born are not included in the statistics for privacy reasons).

=== Thirteenth Century ===
Lasairfhíona Ní Conchobair, Princess of Connacht, bef. 1224-died 1282

Lasairfhíona Ni Conchobair is listed as the wife of Domhnaill Mór O Domhnaill (king of Tyrconnell) in the Annals of the Four Masters. However, as Domhnaill Mór died in 1241 and she outlived him by 41 years, it is possible that she could have contracted for marriage while a widow, because in addition to her wealth she, as an aristocratic lady with ties to two royal families, would have been a political asset. She was the daughter of Cathal Crobhdearg Ua Conchobair of Connacht and the mother of Donnell Óg O'Donnell.

The Annals of Loch Cé note that she gave "a half-bally of her marriage portion, i.e. the half-bally of Ros Birn, to Clarus Mac Maolín and the community of Canons on Trinity Island on Loch Cé in 1239.

Lasairfina ingen Cathail Crobdeirg uxur h. Domnaill do

tabairt lethbaili do ferand phusta .i. Ros Birn do Chlarus Mag

ailin & do comtinol chanonach Oilein na Trinoite

ar Loch Ce i nn-onoir na Trinoite & Mure Bantigerna in hoc anno.

=== Fourteenth Century ===
- Lasairfhíona Uí Ferghail, died 1363.
- Lasarfhíona Ní Conchobair, died 1381.
- Lasairfhíona Uí Duibhgennáin, died 1381.

=== Fifteenth Century ===
Lasarfína Ní Conchobair, died 1418.

Lasairfína Uí Fialain, died 1454: "daughter of Mac Maghnusa, namely, daughter of Cathal junior, son of Cathal Mor, wife of Ua Fialain, that is, of John, son of Eogan Ua Fialain, to wit, a charitable, well-mannered woman, died on the 6th of the Ides 8th of June". (Annals of Ulster, U1454.3)

=== Modern Era ===
Lasairfhíona, Irish-language singer/songwriter, born 1986

== See also ==
- List of Irish-language given names
