= Fedelm (given name) =

Fedelm was an Irish language feminine given name used during the medieval period. It survives as the Latinized form Fidelma. Its masculine equivalent Fedlim (Féilim) has maintained in more common use. Notable people with the name include:

- Fedelm, prophet and fili, in the Ulster Cycle of Irish mythology.
- Fedelm Noíchrothach
