= Aodh mac Diarmada Mac an Bhaird =

Irish poet

Aodh mac Diarmada Mac an Bhaird, Irish poet, fl. c. 1200–1600.

Aodh was a member of the Mac an Bhaird bardic family of County Galway and County Donegal.

Only one extant poem Le héanmhnaoi cuirthear clú ban, has been safely attributed to Aodh. It begins:

Le héanmhnaoi cuirthear clú ban
a clú ó choimmeas ga cur;
ní ríomh do-chóidh ar a crodh;
i ndíol sgol is dóigh a dhul.

It mentions the MacMahon of Airgialla which may indicate personal knowledge of the clan and kingdom.
