= Síofra (given name) =

- Pronunciation: /ˈʃiːfrə/ SHEE-frə; Irish: [ˈʃiːfˠɾˠə]
- Gender: Feminine
- Language: Irish

Origin
- Meaning: changeling

Síofra is a feminine given name of Irish origin meaning elf or changeling.

It may refer to:

- Síofra Cléirigh Büttner (born 1995), Irish middle-distance runner
- Síofra Campbell, Irish actress, cinematographer, director, producer, and writer
- Siofra O'Brien (born 2000), Irish field hockey player
- Síofra O'Leary (born 1968), Irish lawyer and judge at the European Court of Human Rights

== See also ==
- List of Irish-language given names
