= Aoibheann =

Aoibheann (Irish pronunciation: [ˈiːvʲən̪ˠ]; Old Irish: Aíbinn), Aoibhinn ([ˈiːvʲən̠ʲ]), or Aoibhín ([ˈiːvʲiːnʲ]) are Irish language feminine given names.

== Notable people ==
=== Aíbinn ===
- Aíbinn ingen Donnchadha, died 950.
- Aíbinn ingen Duinn Oilen, died 1014.
- Aíbinn Ní Conchobhair, died 1066.

=== Aoibheann ===
- Aoibheann Clancy
- Aoibheann Reilly
- Aoibheann Sweeney

=== Aoibhín ===
- Aoibhín Garrihy

=== Aoibhinn ===
- Aoibhinn Grimes
- Aoibhinn Ní Shúilleabháin

== See also ==
- List of Irish-language given names
