= Turlough =

Turlough may refer to:

== Places ==
- Turlough (lake), a transient waterbody, common in Ireland, fed by groundwater
- Turlough, County Mayo, Ireland, a village
- Turlough Hill, a mountain in Ireland

== People ==
- Toirdelbach, a masculine Irish given name sometimes Anglicised as Turlough
- Turlough O'Brien, Gaelic football manager
- Toirdelbach Ua Briain (1009–1086) Anglicised as Turlough O'Brien, King of Munster, effectively High King of Ireland
- Turlough Luineach O'Neill (1530–1595) Ulster chieftain
- Turlough MacShane O'Neill (died 1608), Irish landowner
- Turlough Ó Carolan (1670–1738) Irish harper
- Vislor Turlough, fictional character from Doctor Who
