= Eoghan Ruadh Mac an Bhaird =

Gaelic-Irish Bardic poet

Eoghan Ruadh Mac an Bhaird (c. 1600 – c. 1610?) Gaelic-Irish Bardic poet.

Eoghan Ruadh was a member of the Mac an Bhaird clan of professional poets, originally from County Galway with a more notable branch settling in County Donegal in the 14th or 15th century.

His surviving compositions are A bhráighe tá i dtor London, Leabhran Gaedhilge, Sgeala Craidhte, Comhdhail Siothchana, and Aodh Ruadh Ó Domhnaill, the latter for Hugh Roe Ó Donnell.

The band The Gloaming has recorded one of his poems.
