= Eamonn =

Eamonn or Éamon or Eamon may refer to:

- Eamonn (given name), an Irish male given name
- Eamon (singer) (born 1983), American R&B singer-songwriter and harmonicist
- Eamon (video game), a 1980 computer role-playing game for the Apple II
- "Éamonn an Chnoic" (Ned of the Hill), an Irish song

== See also ==
- Ayman
