= Seoirse =

Irish masculine given name

Seoirse (Irish: [ˈʃoːɾˠʃə]) is an Irish masculine given name. It is the Irish equivalent of George. The name was rare in Ireland prior to the ascension of the House of Hanover to the throne of the Kingdom of Great Britain and Ireland in the early 18th century. A rare variant of the name is Seorsa.

== People ==
People with the name Seoirse include:

- Seóirse Bodley (1933–2023), Irish composer and associate professor of music
- Seoirse Brún (George Browne; fl. 1876), Irish scribe
- Seoirse Bulfin (born 1979), Irish hurling manager and player
- Seoirse Clancy (George Clancy; 1881–1921), Irish nationalist politician
- Seoirse Mac Cluain (1894–1949), Irish-language scholar
- Seoirse Mac Tomáis, the Irish name of George Derwent Thomson (1903–1987), British classical scholar, Marxist philosopher, and scholar of the Irish language
- Seoirse Ó Dochartaigh (born 1946), Irish musician, artist and writer

== See also ==
- List of Irish-language given names
