= Ádhamh =

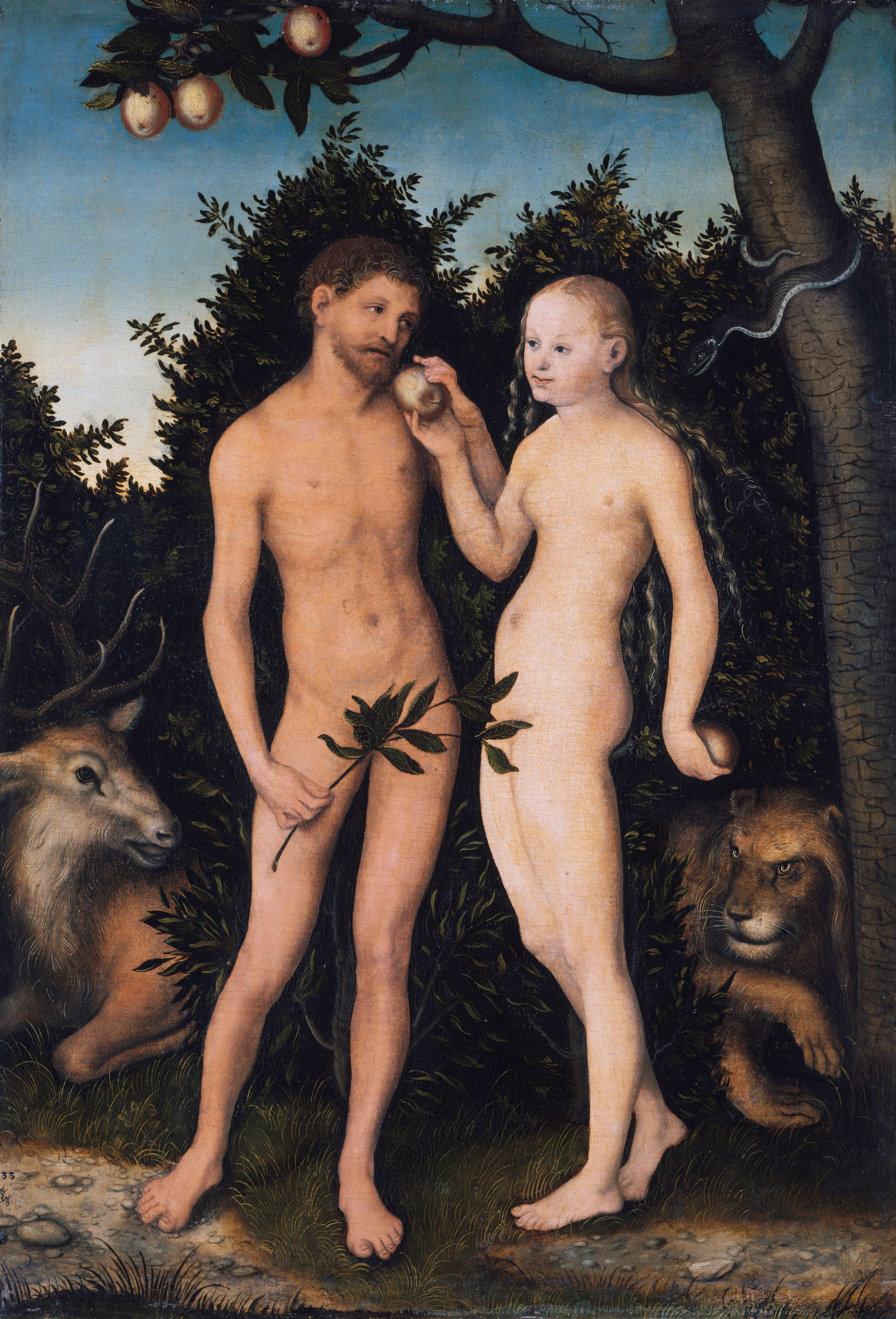

Ádhamh is the Irish language version of the name Adam. It may refer to:

- Ádhamh Ó Cianáin (died 1373), Irish historian and genealogist
- Ádhamh Ó Cuirnín, Irish medieval scribe
- Ádhamh Cúisín (fl. c. 1400), Irish scribe and genealogist
- Leabhar Adhamh Ó Cianáin, medieval manuscript by Adhamh Ó Cianáin

== See also ==
- Àdhamh, Scottish Gaelic form of the name
- List of Irish-language given names
