= Laoisioch Mac an Bhaird =

Laoisioch Mac an Bhaird, Gaelic-Irish poet, fl. c. 16th-century.

A member of the Mac an Bhaird family of professional poets, Laoisioch is known from two surviving poems, A fhir ghlacas a ghalldacht, Dairt sonn dá seoladh go Tadhg and Mo chean duitsi, a thulach thall.
