= Branagh =

Branagh is a surname. Notable people with the surname include:

- Kenneth Branagh (born 1960), Northern Irish actor and filmmaker
- Nicole Branagh (born 1979), American volleyball player

== See also ==
- Bronagh
