= Fergusson =

Fergusson may refer to:

== Places ==
- County of Fergusson, South Australia, Australia
- Fergusson Island, off the coast of New Guinea
- Fergusson Glacier, Wilson Hills, Antarctica
- Nacimiento-Fergusson Road, the only road across the Santa Lucia Range in the Central Coast of California
- Fergusson Square, Toorak Gardens, South Australia, Australia; in Adelaide

== People ==
- Fergusson (surname), including a list of people with the surname
- Fergusson baronets of Nova Scotia
- Ferguson Wright Hume (1859–1932), British novelist

== Other uses ==
- Fergusson Bridge, Cambridge, New Zealand; over the Waikato River
- Fergusson Intermediate, Upper Hutt, Wellington, New Zealand; a co-ed intermediate school
- Fergusson University (formerly Fergusson College), in Pune, India
- Fergusson Museum, Bhuj, Kutch, Gujarat, India
- Robert Fergusson (store), Australian chain of stores

== See also ==
- Governor Fergusson (disambiguation)
- Fergusson College Road, Pune, India
- Fergusson Island striped possum
- Fergie (disambiguation)
- Ferguson (disambiguation)
