= Eamonn (given name) =

Eamonn or Eamon (/ˈeɪmən/ AY-mən; Irish: Éamonn, Éamon, or Eadhmonn pronounced [ˈeːmˠən̪ˠ]), is a masculine Irish given name. It is an Irish form of the English Edmund, or Edward, which are derived from Old English names containing the elements ēad ("prosperity, riches"), mund ("protector") and ward (guard).

== List of people with the given names ==
- Eamonn Andrews (1922–1987), Irish television personality
- Éamon de Buitléar (1930–2013), Irish documentary film maker
- Eamonn Butler (born 1953), British economist, director of the Adam Smith Institute
- Eamonn Breen (born 1969/1970), Irish gaelic football player
- Eamonn Campbell (1946–2017), Irish musician
- Eamonn Casey (1927–2017), Irish bishop
- Éamonn Ceannt (1881–1916), Irish nationalist and rebel
- Eamonn Coghlan (born 1952), Irish runner and senator
- Eamon Collins (1954–1999), Irish Republican Army volunteer
- Eamon Colman (born 1957), Irish artist
- Eamonn Darcy (born 1952), Irish golfer
- Eamonn Darcy (footballer) (1933–2022), Irish footballer
- Eamon (singer) (born 1983 or 1984), American singer-songwriter
- Eamonn Duggan (1878–1936), Irish politician
- Eamon Dunphy (born 1945), Irish footballer and television football pundit
- Eamonn Holmes (born 1959), Northern Irish television personality
- Eamonn Keane (actor) (1925–1990), Irish actor
- Eamonn Keane (weightlifter) (fl. 2000s–2010s), Irish weightlifter
- Eamon Kissane (1899–1979), Irish politician
- Eamonn McCann (born 1943), Northern Irish journalist and activist
- Eamon McGee (born 1984), Irish footballer
- Eamonn McGrath (1929–2008), Irish author
- Eamon Melaugh (1933–2025), Irish socialist, political campaigner and activist
- Eamon Powell (born 2002), American ice hockey player
- Eamon Ryan (born 1963), Irish Green Party politician
- Éamonn Ryan (1941–2021), Irish football manager
- Eamon Sullivan (born 1985), Australian swimmer
- Éamon de Valera (1882–1975), Irish taoiseach and president
- Eamonn Walker (born 1962), British actor
- Éamon Zayed (born 1983), Irish-Libyan footballer

== Fictional characters ==
- Éamon, a main character in the RTÉ sitcom Bridget & Éamon
- Éamon, a main character in 2024 film An Taibhse
- Eamon, a minor character in the 1988 film High Spirits
- Eamon Bailey, a character in the 2017 film The Circle
- Eamon Dempsey, a character in the New Zealand soap opera Shortland Street
- Eamon O'Reilly, a character in the 1973 film The Doll Squad
- Eamon Valda, a character in Robert Jordan's fantasy book series The Wheel of Time
- Eamon Yzalli, an alias used by Corran Horn in the Star Wars expanded universe novels.

== See also ==
- Eamonn (disambiguation)
- List of Irish-language given names
