= Naoise (disambiguation) =

Naoise is a figure in the Ulster Cycle of Irish myth, lover of Deirdre.

Naoise may also refer to:

- Naoise EP, musical recording by Dosh

== People with the name ==
- Naoise Dolan (born 1992), Irish novelist
- Naoíse Mac Sweeney (born 1982), British archaeologist and ancient historian
- Naoise Ó Baoill (born 1997), Irish-Japanese Gaelic footballer
- Naoise Ó Cairealláin, Irish rapper
- Naoise O'Haughan (1691-1721), highwayman
- Naoise Ó Muirí (1972-), Fine Gael politician
- Naoisé O'Reilly, psychologist

== See also ==
- Nessie (disambiguation)
