= Keelin =

Keelin is a given name. Notable people with the given name include:

- Keelin Fox, Irish badminton player
- Keelin Godsey (born 1984), American transgender hammer thrower
- Keelin Shanley (born 1968), Irish journalist, newsreader and presenter
- Keelin Winters (born 1988), American soccer player
