= Flann =

- Pronunciation: /flæn/ FLAN
- Gender: male/female
- Name day: 15 December

Other gender
- Masculine: Flann/Flannan
- Feminine: Flann/Flannaid

Origin
- Origin: Irish
- Meaning: from the Irish meaning 'red-haired'

Other names
- Variant forms: Flannan, Flannaid

Flann is both an English surname and an Irish masculine given name, but has also been used as a feminine given name.

It might refer to:

- Flann Fína mac Ossu, another name for King Aldfrith of Northumbria (died 704 or 705)
- Flann mac Lonáin (died 896), Irish poet
- Flann Sinna (died 916), also called Flann mac Maíl Sechnaill, High King of Ireland
- Flann Mainistrech (died 1056), Irish scholar
- Flann O'Brien, a pen name used by Irish writer Brian O'Nolan (1911–1966)

FLANN, an acronym for Fast Library for Approximate Nearest Neighbors, is a C++ library for approximate nearest neighbor search in high-dimensional spaces.

== See also ==
- List of Irish-language given names
