= Senan =

Senan may refer to:

== People ==
=== Given name ===
- Senán mac Geirrcinn (488–544), Irish saint, founder of Inis Cathaigh
- Senan of Laraghbrine (fl. 6th century), Irish Christian monk and saint
- Senan Abdelqader (born 1962), Palestinian architect and urban planner
- Senan Allen, Irish lawyer and judge
- Senan Connell, Irish Gaelic footballer
- Senan Cooke (born 1945), Irish hurler
- Senan Jones (born 2000), Irish cricketer
- Senan Kelly (born 1996), Irish boxer
- Senan Kilbride, Irish Gaelic footballer
- Senan Molony, Irish journalist and author
- Senan Louis O'Donnell (1927–2023), Irish Catholic prelate, Bishop of Maiduguri, Nigeria
- Senan van der Merwe (born 1986), South African rugby union player

=== Surname ===
- Amel Senan (born 1966), Iraqi Turkmen actress
- José Francisco de Paula Señan (1760–1823), Spanish missionary to the Americas

== Places ==
- Senan, Yonne, a commune in France
- Senan, Iran, a village in Iran
- Senan, Tarragona, a municipality in Spain

== Other uses ==
- National Aeronaval Service (Servicio Nacional Aeronaval), a branch of the Panamanian Public Forces
- Senan Browne, a fictional character in the 2017 film The Cured
- Senan Padai, a Sri Lankan Tamil militant group
