= Fintan Walsh =

Irish Gaelic footballer

Fintan Walsh was Gaelic football player from County Laois in Ireland.

He played for many years on the Laois senior football team in the forwards and was widely regarded as one of the outstanding players in Ireland of the 1950s and early 1960s.

He was a successful college player winning Hogan Cup medals with Knockbeg College in 1954 and 1955.

in 1956, Fintan won championship medals in two different counties. He assisted his home club Ballylinan to victory in the Laois Junior Football Championship while also helping Erins Hope win the Dublin Senior Football Championship.

He also played for his province Leinster winning Railway Cup medals in 1959 and 1961.

In 1999, he was selected at left half forward on the Laois football team of the century.
