= Governor Ferguson =

Governor Ferguson or Fergusson may refer to:

- Bernard Fergusson, Baron Ballantrae (1911–1980), Governor-General of New Zealand
- Sir Charles Fergusson, 7th Baronet (1865–1951), 3rd Governor-General of New Zealand
- George Ferguson (Lt Governor of Tobago) (1748–1820), Lieutenant Governor of Tobago in 1781, sometimes referred to as Governor
- George Fergusson (diplomat) (born 1955), Governor of the Pitcairn Islands, from 2006 to 2010 and Governor of Bermuda from 2012 to 2016
- Jan Helenus Ferguson (1826–1908), Governor of the Dutch Gold Coast from 1871 to 1872
- James Fergusson (British Army officer) (1787–1865), Governor of Gibraltar from 1855 to 1859
- James E. Ferguson (1871–1944), 26th Governor of Texas
- Sir James Fergusson, 6th Baronet (1832–1907), Governor of South Australia from 1868 to 1873, Governor of New Zealand from 1873 to 1874, and Governor of Bombay from 1880 to 1885
- Miriam A. Ferguson (1875–1961), 29th and 32nd Governor of Texas
- Thompson Benton Ferguson (1857–1921), 6th Governor of Oklahoma Territory
