= Fidelma =

Fidelma is an Irish female given name, a Latinization of Fedelm.

== People named Fidelma ==
- Fidelma Healy Eames (born 1962), politician
- Fidelma Macken (born 1942), judge
- Sister a Fidelma, main character in the Sister Fidelma mysteries
- St. Fidelma, an Irish princess baptised by St. Patrick.
- Fidelma carter Director of Public Health in NI Chest, health and stroke.
