= The Fergies =

Australian musical group

- Origin: Brisbane, Queensland, Australia
- Genres: Indie
- Years active: 2007–present
- Label: Unsigned
- Members: Kahlia Ferguson (24); Daniel Ferguson (23); Joel Ferguson (21); Nathan Ferguson (20); Shani Ferguson (18)
- Website: thefergiesofficial.com

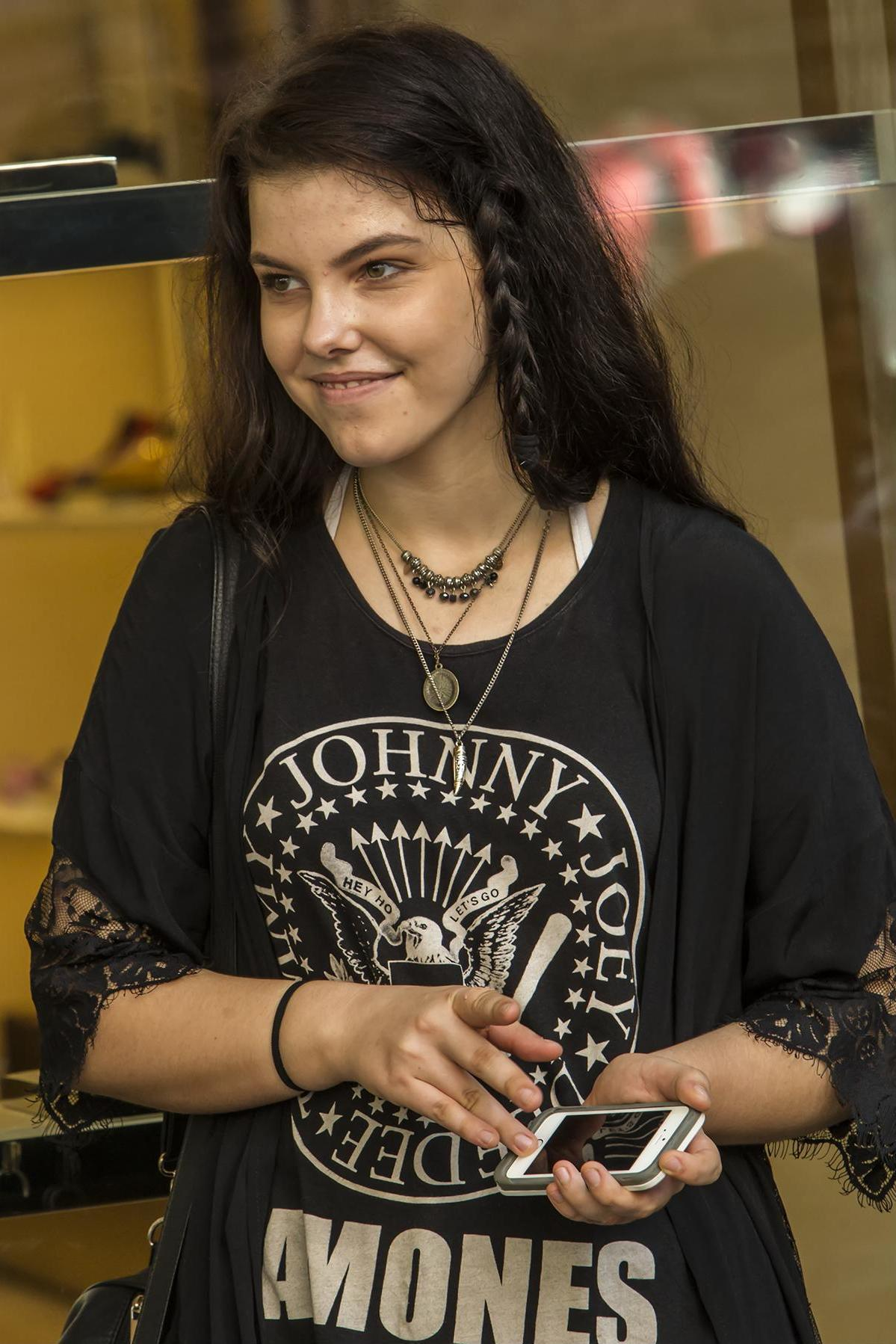
Fergies in Brisbane Queen Street Mall

The Fergies is a folk/indie/rock/pop band from Brisbane, Australia formed by the five Ferguson siblings, Kahlia, Daniel, Joel, Nathan, and Shani. Their music has grown in popularity due to their busking performances on Queen Street Mall and originals uploaded to YouTube.

In the band's earlier years, The Fergies gained recognition by winning a number of local, state and national band and songwriting competitions and awards. The Fergies' lead singer, Kahlia Ferguson, won the senior category of the Australian Children's Music Foundation's (ACMF) National Song Writing Competition two years in a row, with Little Bird in 2008 and Soldier Boy in 2009. In 2010 they were also awarded the Secondary School Award in the Queensland music industry's Q Song Awards in Brisbane. In the same year, The Fergies won the grand final of the Caloundra Music Festival Original Selection, where they supported Powderfinger. The group also won in the YoungStar Awards 2010–2011.

In recent years the band shifted their focus to busking acoustically on Brisbane's busiest city street, Queen Street Mall. Describing the motivation behind their street performing, Kahlia Ferguson explains, 'When you busk there's absolutely nowhere to hide. You face the crowd and deliver something engaging or people just ignore you. It keeps you real as a performer - gets you out from behind technology and connected to real people.'

== Performances ==
In 2010 they opened for Powderfinger at the Caloundra Music Festival. They also opened the Queensland Music Industry's Q Song Awards Night at the Tivoli Theatre in 2010. The band also played at the 2010 Hays Inlet Festival, on 6 June. In 2012, the band performed at The Hills Carnivale which was held on 19 May, in Ferny Hills, Queensland. In 2012's New Year's Eve, the band performed in Queensland at the New Year's Mooloolaba.

== Members ==
- Kahlia Ferguson (b.1993): lead vocals, guitar, keys
- Daniel Ferguson (b.1994): lead vocals, lead guitar
- Joel Ferguson (b.1996): lead vocals, drums
- Nathan Ferguson (b.1997): lead vocals, bass
- Shani Ferguson (b.1999): lead vocals, keyboard
