= Bronagh =

Bronagh or Brónagh is a male or female name of Irish origin; it may refer to:

- Alleged Celtic Goddess Bronach (also called Cailleach)
- Saint Brónach (sometimes anglicised to Bronagh), a 6th-century holy woman from Ireland
- Bronagh Gallagher (born 1972), Irish singer and actress
- Bronágh Taggart, Northern Irish actress and writer
- Bronagh Waugh (born 1982), Northern Irish actress

== See also ==
- Branagh
