= Alex Fergus =

Scottish footballer

Personal information
- Full name: Alexander Ferguson
- Date of birth: 1899
- Place of birth: Kirkintilloch, Scotland
- Date of death: Unknown
- Position: Full back

Senior career*
| Years | Team | Apps | (Gls) |
| 1924–1926 | Burnley | 38 | (0) |
| 1926–1928 | Coventry City | 30 | (0) |
- * Club domestic league appearances and goals

Alexander Fergus (1899 – unknown) was a Scottish professional association footballer who played as a full back. His nickname, famously, was Fergie.
