= Fearghal mac Domhnuill Ruaidh Mac an Bhaird =

Fearghal mac Domhnuill Ruaidh mac an Bhaird, Gaelic-Irish bardic poet, died 1550.

A member of the Donegal branch of the learned Mac an Bhaird family. His son was the poet Fearghal Óg Mac an Bhaird.

He is known as the author of only one surviving composition, Olc íocthar ar luagh leighis, a poem of one hundred and forty-eight lines which concludes thus:

Cóir linn fa lár do leigeadh;
don Chóir ní tráth dá teagar;
fuil bhas is chígh ad chogar
obadh sídh as nach eagal.
