= Peg (nickname) =

Peg is a generally feminine nickname, usually a short form of Margaret or Peggy.

It may refer to:

== People ==
=== Women ===
- Peg Alexander, UK journalist, broadcaster, and former politician
- Peg Blitch (1934–2021), American politician and judge
- Peg Bracken (1918–2007), American author of humor books
- Peg Entwistle (1908–1932), British actress
- Peg Fenwick (1907–1987), American screenwriter and playwright
- Margaret Flory (born 1948), American politician
- Margaret Hughes (1630–1719), English actress often credited as the first professional actress on the English stage, mistress of Prince Rupert of the Rhine
- Peg Kehret (born 1936), American children's writer
- Peg LaCentra (c. 1910–1996), American contralto singer
- Peg Lautenschlager (1955–2018), American attorney and politician, first woman Attorney General of Wisconsin
- Peg Lynch (1916–2015), American writer, actress, and sitcom creator
- Peg Maltby (1899–1984), English-born Australian book illustrator and children's writer
- Peg Murray (1924–2020), American actress
- Peg O'Connor, American feminist philosopher
- Peg Phillips (1918–2002), American actress
- Peg Putt (born 1953), Australian politician and environmental advocate
- Peg Shreve (1927–2012), American politician
- Peg Taylor (cricketer) (1917–2004), New Zealand cricketer
- Peg Woffington (1720–1760), Irish actress and socialite
- Peg Yorkin (1927–2023), American feminist activist, philanthropist, and fundraiser

=== Men ===
- Sprague Cleghorn (1890–1956), Canadian ice hockey player
- William Duval (ice hockey) (1877–1905), Canadian ice hockey player

== Fictional characters ==
- Peg Bundy, a main character in the American sitcom Married... with Children
