= Seoirse Brún =

Irish scribe

Seoirse Brún (George Browne), was an Irish scribe, fl. 1876. Brún, a native of Creggduff, Annaghdown, County Galway, is known only from a manuscript called RBÉ F006. It contains the following note:

George Browne Cregg Duff This Book/Belongs to him For Certain No Other Person/in This Locality can claim on This/Book but him Alone When he is Dead/and his bones are rotten This Little Book/Will tell his Name when he is quite/Forgotten Given under My ha[n]d this 18th Day of Oct 1876 - George Browne/Cregg Duff Annadown/County of Galway Ireland, The European Iliad.

The Annaghdown-Headford has Irish speakers as of 2009. He may have been descended from one of The Tribes of Galway, the family Browne.

== See also ==
- Sir Dominick Browne, M.P., ca. 1585?-ca. 1656.
- Mary Bonaventure Browne, Poor Clare and historian, born after 1610, died after 1670.
- Geoffrey Browne, M.P., died 1668.
- Dominick Browne, Mayor of Galway, 1688-1689.
- Michael Browne (1895–1980), Bishop of Galway and Kilmacduagh from 1937 to 1976.
- Dominick Browne, 1st Baron Oranmore and Browne (1787–1860), politician.
- Séamus de Brún (1911–2003), teacher and senator
- Ken Bruen (born 1951), noir crime writer.
