= Doireann O'Mahony =

Irish barrister

- Education: University College Cork
- Occupation: Barrister

Doireann O’Mahony (born c 1990) is a barrister, and founder of The Irish Sepsis Foundation.

== Biography ==
Doireann O’Mahony attended University College Cork and completed a Bachelor of Civil Law in 2010. She went on to get her Bachelor of Laws in 2011 before being called to the Bar in 2012. In 2018 O'Mahony was called to the Bar of England and Wales. She is a leading practitioner of medical negligence litigation.

In 2022 O’Mahony founded non-profit charity, The Irish Sepsis Foundation.

Her first book Medical Negligence and Childbirth was published in 2015 and was awarded 'Legal Book of the Year' at the Irish Law Awards in 2016. Her second book, Medical Inquests came out in 2022. In 2023 O'Mahony was presented with a civic award by the Lord Mayor of Cork.
