= Túathal =

Tuathal (Old Irish: Túathal) is an Irish male name meaning [ruling with] 'fervour over the people' or 'valour of the tribe', from Old Irish túath 'people, tribe, tribal territory' + gal 'ardour, valour', from Proto-Celtic *galā 'might, ability'.

tuathal is also the Modern Irish for movement anticlockwise or widdershins, from the Old Irish túath 'left, north' + sel 'turn', from a different Proto-Celtic root not meaning 'people, tribe', see there, sense 2 for details.

People with the name include:

- Túathal Techtmar, legendary king
- Túathal Máelgarb (fl. 6th century), king of Tara
- Túathal mac Máele-Brigte (died 854), king of Leinster
- Tuathal Mac Augaire (died 958), king of Leinster
- Túathal (bishop of the Scots) (fl. 1050s), bishop of Cennrígmonaid, modern St Andrews
- Tuathal Ua Connachtaig (fl. 12th century) Irish bishop of Kells or Breifne

The surname O'Toole is an anglicisation of Ó Tuathail (Old Irish: Ua Túathail), meaning grandson or descendant of Túathal. One instance is the O'Toole family prominent in medieval Wicklow, who claimed descent from Tuathal Mac Augaire.

Placenames associated with the name include:

- Listowel (Irish: Lios Túathail) 'Túathal's ringfort', a town in County Kerry
- Carrauntoohil (Irish: Corrán Túathail) 'Túathal's sickle', a mountain in County Kerry
- Glasthule (Irish: Glas Túathail) 'Túathal's stream', a suburb of Dublin

== See also ==
- List of Irish-language given names
- Túathalán (died 749), abbot of Cennrígmonaid, modern St Andrews
