= Fearghal Óg Mac an Bhaird =

Fearghal Óg Mac an Bhaird (born by 1550, died after 1616) was a Gaelic-Irish bardic poet.

== Biography ==
A member of the Donegal branch of the learned Mac an Bhaird family, he was the son of Fearghail mheic Dhomhnaill Ruaidh Mac an Bhaird, who died in 1550.

He visited Scotland and enjoyed the patronage of James VI. Red Hugh O'Donnell accorded him high status, and in 1602 Fearghal Óg wrote the lament Teasda Éire san Easbáinn, describing Ireland as an infertile waste after her prince's death.

When James VI ascended the English throne in 1603 Fearghal Óg wrote an inaugural poem, Trí coróna i gcairt Shéamais, celebrating the new king's claims to three crowns. Some time after writing an elegy on Aodh Óg Ó Domhnaill of Ramelton, Co. Donegal, in 1616, Fearghal Óg went to Louvain, where he lived in poverty.

He may have participated in An Iomarbhágh na bhFileadh (Contention of the Bards).

== Poems ==
- Truagh liom Máire agus Mairghréag ...
- Mór cóir cháich ar chrích Laighion ... in the Leabhar Branach (Book of the O'Byrnes), in which Fiachaidh Mac Aodha Ó Broin is claimed to be "the prophesied one referred to by St. Brighid and Brógán", is attributed to him though elsewhere it is attributed to a Niall Ó Ruandha
