= Dervla =

Dervla and Derval are female Irish given names, anglicised from Deirbhile and Dearbháil, respectively. Dearbhla is a hybrid of the two names. Deirbhile means 'daughter of the filí' [poet]. Dearbháil, a common medieval name, may mean 'daughter of Fál', Fál being a poetic name for Ireland; or else 'true desire'.

People with these names include:

== Deirbhile, Dervla ==
- Darbiled or Deirbhile, an anchoress who founded a monastery at Erris in the sixth century
- Dervla Kirwan (born 1971) Irish actress
- Dervla Murphy (1931–2022) Irish travel writer
- Dervla Burke, musician in the country band Crystal Swing
- Dervla Magennis, contestant in series 1 of The Voice of Ireland

== Derbáil, Dearbháil, Dearbhail, Derval ==
- Dearbháil iníon Tadhg mac Cathal (died 925), aunt of Cathal mac Conchobair, king of Connacht
- Derval O'Rourke (born 1981), sprint hurdler
- Derval Symes, visual artist

== Dearbhla ==
- Dearbhla Walsh, film and television director
- Dearbhla Molloy (born 1946), actress

== Fictional ==
- Dearbhla Dillon, character in the soap opera Fair City
- Dervla Nolan, character in the novel Dead Famous
- Dervla Dove, child character in the novel Flight of the Doves
- Harrower Dervla, a boss in the video game Lords of the Fallen
