= Toirdelbach =

Toirdhealbhach (Old Irish: Tairdelbach) is a masculine Irish given name. Forms of the name include Tarlach and Traolach. It is often anglicised Turlough. The name ultimately derives from Irish: toirdhealbh "prompting", and originated as a byname meaning "instigator".

== People with the name ==
=== Tairrdelbach ===
- Tairrdelbach Ua Conchobair, called Toirdelbach Mór, king of Ireland (d. 1156)

=== Tarlach ===
- Tarlach Ó Mealláin (fl. 1640s), Irish Franciscan
- Tarlach Mac Suibhne (c. 1831–1916), Irish piper
- Tarlach Rua Mac Dónaill (fl. early 18th century), Irish poet

=== Toirdelbach ===
- Toirdelbach mac Murchada meic Briain, grandson of Brian Boru (d. 1014)
- Toirdhealbhach mac Ruaidhrí Ó Conchobhair, king of Connacht (d. 1239)
- Toirdelbach Ó Conchobair, king of Connacht (d. 1345)
- Toirdelbach Ua Briain, king of Munster (d. 1086)

=== Toirdhealbhach ===
- Toirdhealbhach Óg Donn Ó Conchobair, king of Connacht (d. 1461)

=== Turlough ===
- Turlough Luineach O'Neill (1530–1595) Ulster chieftain
- Turlough MacShane O'Neill (died 1608), Irish landowner
- Turlough Ó Carolan (1670–1738) Irish harper
- Vislor Turlough, a Doctor Who fictional character

== Places ==
=== In Ireland ===
- Turlough, a village in County Mayo
- Turlough Hill, an electricity generating station in County Wicklow

== See also ==
- List of Irish-language given names
