= Saoirse (given name) =

- Pronunciation: /ˈsɪərʃə, ˈsɜːrʃə/ SEER-shə, SUR-shə; Irish: [ˈsˠiːɾˠʃə]
- Language: Irish

Origin
- Meaning: 'freedom'

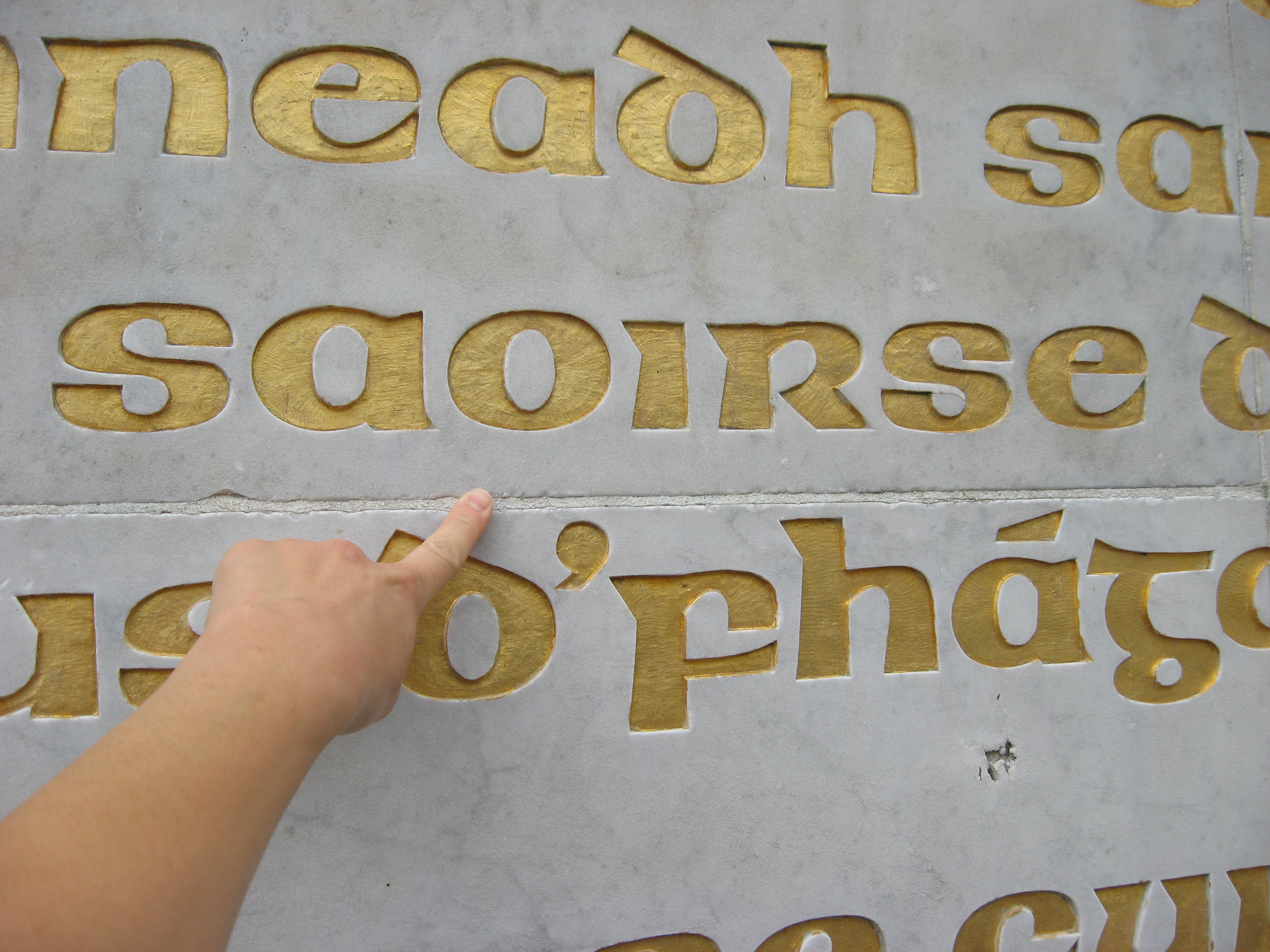
The word saoirse, meaning 'freedom': inscription, Garden of Remembrance, Dublin.

Saoirse ( Irish: [ˈsˠiːɾˠʃə]; anglicised /ˈsɪəɹʃə/, /ˈsɛəɹʃə/, or /ˈsɜːɹʃə/ ) is an Irish-language given name meaning "freedom". It became popular in Ireland in the late 20th century. The actress Saoirse Ronan has given the name prominence internationally since her 2007 breakthrough in Atonement.

== Statistics ==
The Central Statistics Office (CSO) records 1971 as the first year having more than two registered births with the name in the Republic of Ireland. The first year it entered the top 100 girls' names was 1994. Its top count was 355 in 2010 (rank 18th) while its top rank was 12th in 2016 (count 324). In 2025 it ranked 17th, with 176 registrations. The CSO has also recorded variant spellings Saoírse (max 9, in 2025) and Saorise (max 3, in 2005 and 2014). The highest rank recorded by the Northern Ireland Statistics and Research Agency (NIRSA) has been 37th in 2023 (count 50) and 2024 (count 46). NIRSA also notes isolated instances of variants Saoirise and Saoirsa, and double names such as Saoirse-Eirinn, Saoirse-Grace, Saoirse-Marie.

Social Security number applications for births that occurred in the United States show Saoirse was most popular in 2020, ranking 735th with 373 births. In England and Wales the name peaked the same year, in 307th place with 151 registrations. In Scotland the peak year was 2021 (153rd place, count 29).

== People ==
- Saoirse McHugh (born 1990), Irish-American environmentalist
- Saoirse-Monica Jackson (born 1993), Northern Irish actress
- Saoirse Ronan (born 1994), Irish and American actress
- Saoirse Noonan (born 1999), Irish footballer

== Horses ==
- Saoirse (horse), Canadian thoroughbred racehorse
- Saoirse Abu, American thoroughbred racehorse

== Fictional characters ==
- Saoirse, a little girl in the 2014 film Song of the Sea
- Saoirse, a guardian spirit in the 2017 videogame Nioh
- Saoirse, a woman in "Natural Justice", the first episode of the Irish television series Single-Handed.
- Saoirse Shaw, a main character in the 2026 comedy thriller series How to Get to Heaven from Belfast

== See also ==
- List of Irish-language given names
