= Nevan =

Male given name

Nevan (Irish: Naomhán, pronounced [ˈn̪ˠiːwaːnˠ]; meaning "saintly, holy", or "little saint") was a saint in Irish folklore whose feast day was reputedly marked in mid-September. In Seathrún Céitinn's General History of Ireland (first published in 1723), Naomhán is described as the "son of Maolciarain, primate of Ireland".

Sometimes associated with the surname MacNiven, the name is also sometimes used as a given name for boys.

With a different origin, Nevan is also a popular Islamic name found throughout North Africa, Arabia, and the Indian subcontinent.

== Notable people ==
- Nevan Krogan, Canadian biologist

== See also ==
- Nevin (surname)
- Nevan (Devil May Cry), a demon appearing in the videogame Devil May Cry 3
- Trevor McNevan (born 1978), Canadian singer and rapper
