= Fergal =

Fergal or Feargal are Irish male given names. They are anglicised forms of the name Fearghal.

== The arts ==
- Fergal Keane, OBE (born 1961), Irish writer and broadcaster
- Feargal Sharkey (born 1958), former lead singer of The Undertones
- Fergal Stapleton (born 1961), Irish contemporary artist
- Fergal Lawler (born 1971), Irish drummer, member and co-founder of The Cranberries

== Royalty ==
- Fergal Aidne mac Artgaile (died 696), King of Connacht from the Ui Fiachrach Aidhne branch of the Connachta
- Fergal mac Anmchada (died 802), King of Osraige in modern County Kilkenny
- Fergal mac Máele Dúin (died 722), High King of Ireland
- Fergal Ua Ruairc (died 956), King of Connacht

== Sports ==
- Fergal Byron (born 1974), former Gaelic football player for Laois
- Fergal Devitt (born 1981), Irish professional wrestler
- Fergal Doherty (born 1981), Irish Gaelic footballer
- Fergal Hartley (born 1973), Irish hurler
- Fergal Healy (born 1977), Irish hurler
- Feargal Logan (born 20th century), former Tyrone Gaelic footballer
- Fergal McCormack (born 1974), Irish sportsperson
- Fergal McCusker (born 1970), Gaelic footballer
- Fergal O'Brien (born 1972), Irish professional snooker player
- Fergal Ryan (born 1972), former Irish sportsperson

== Other ==
- Fergal Browne (born 1973), Fine Gael Party politician from County Carlow in Ireland
- Fergal Caraher (born 1970), Sinn Féin member who was killed by British security forces
- Fergal O'Hanlon (1936–1957), member/volunteer in the Irish Republican Army
- Feargal Quinn (born 1936), businessman
