= Naoisé O'Reilly =

Irish psychologist

Doctor Naoisé O'Reilly
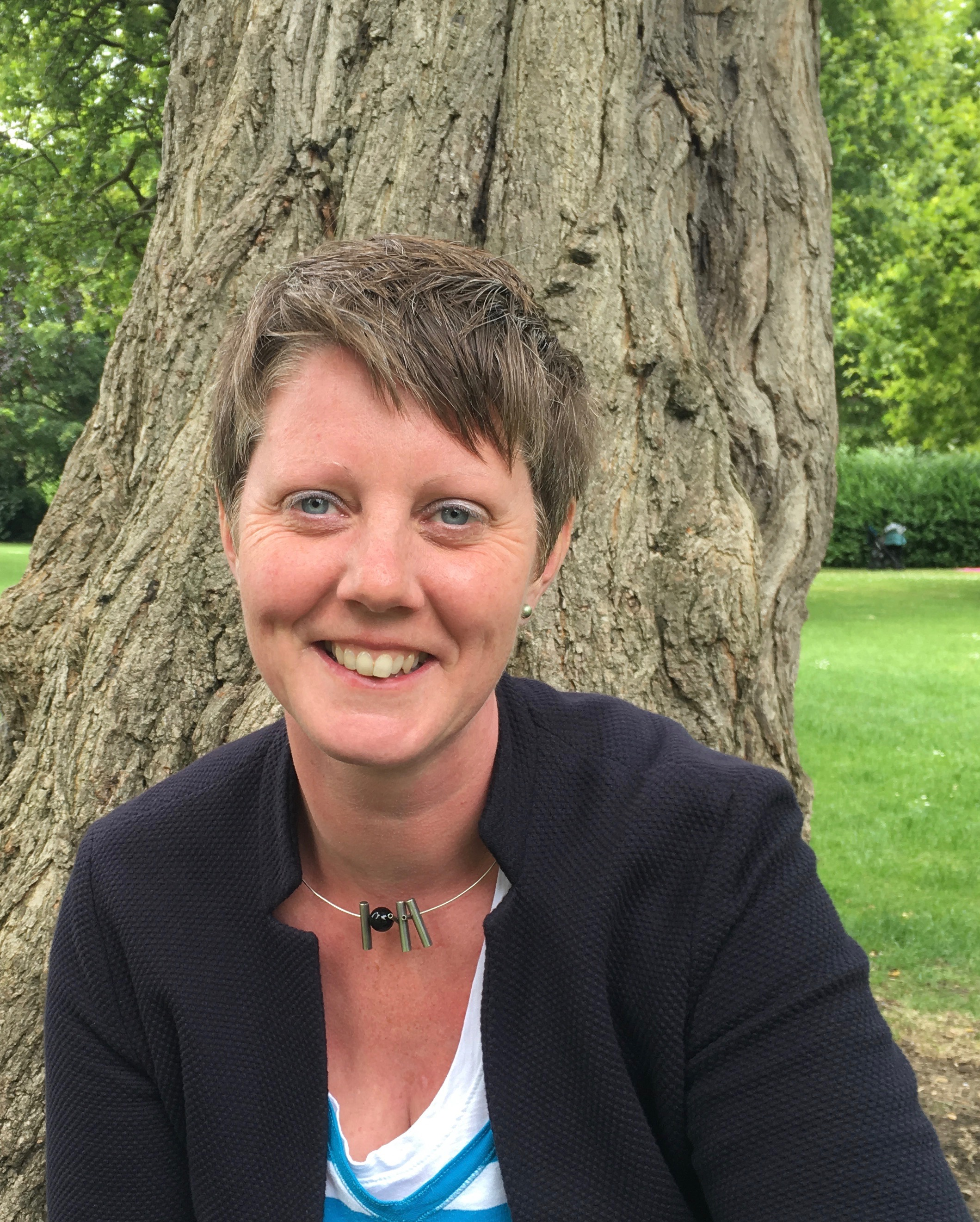
- Naoisé O'Reilly in 2019
- Occupations: Personality theory researcher, physical oceanographer, observational scientist, educationalist
- Known for: Personality theory, learning difficulties research, four learning styles
- Website: drnaoiseoreilly.org

Naoisé O'Reilly is a psychology expert who develops methods in the areas of expression and psychological profiling. She earned a PhD in physical oceanography from the National Oceanography Centre at the University of Southampton, United Kingdom in 2007. The British Library catalogued her PhD dissertation entitled Combining Altimetry and Hydrography with Inverse Methods. Outlined as one of the conclusions, O'Reilly developed an oceanography satellite altimetry and argo float big data scientific research system to analyse the state of the north Atlantic Ocean in three dimensional surface elevations. She graduated from the National University of Ireland, Galway in 2000 with a first class honours degree in marine science. She studied quantitative Earth observations at the University of Oxford and geophysical and environmental fluid dynamics at the University of Cambridge in 2002.

== Dyslexia ==
O'Reilly has severe dyslexia and as a teenager an educational psychologist said she was not suited to attend college. She says literacy is not a gauge of intelligence and that "personality is an inconvenience in school." In an education and teaching book about getting high school grades she spoke of introducing reward systems in the home for dyslexic children saying "the goal should be achievable and have the right level of challenge." Interviewed by a journalist in 1999 during her time in university in Ireland O'Reilly said "school is the worst place for a dyslexic." Her methods examine personality theory and four learning styles of auditory, visual, practical and kinesthetic with children and adults in Ireland and around the World. She was Anti-Discrimination Officer for the Students' Union and Student Activist for people with disabilities at the National University of Ireland, Galway in addition to National Disability Rights Officer for the Union of Students of Ireland.

The observational scientist and physical oceanographer taught at the European Space Agency Earth Observation Summer School in Frascati, Italy in 2004 on a course run for postdoctoral researchers interpreting and using satellite images in Earth science research. She assisted the Kenya Marine and Fisheries Research Institute in developing a UNESCO postgraduate level workshop called the Application of Satellite Altimetry to Oceanography. This was a training course for the western Indian Ocean region run in Africa for postdoctoral students in 2004. She addressed the European Geosciences Union general assembly in Nice, France in 2004 and her works were presented at an Argo Science workshop in Venice, Italy in 2006.

== Education methods ==
A series of educational methods for students with learning difficulties called the Purple Learning Project were developed by O'Reilly in an education centre she founded in 2009 called the Homework Club located in Blanchardstown, Dublin, Ireland. Classes are not created based on age or academic level but student personality type and ability. Classroom sizes are capped with a maximum of ten students per class taught by honours university graduates trained in O'Reilly's teaching methods. The government of Finland engaged with research from the Irish educationalist. Interviewed for a college in the United States about dealing with difficult children the personality theory researcher and educationalist placed importance on investigating the environment and surroundings when problems frequently emerge to help discover what triggers can spark behaviour. O'Reilly has said "I read backwards and see the world in reverse. In fact my own PhD research was an inverse method." Other educational methods developed by O'Reilly include the Experience Effect and the Gap Effect.

== Learning difficulties ==
Attention deficit hyperactivity disorder is an area she has been described as an expert in and supporting people with Asperger syndrome, dyslexia, developmental co-ordination disorder, dyscalculia, dysgraphia, hearing impairments, expression disorders and depression.

== Personality theory ==
The educational innovator made a breakthrough in psychology research in 2013 by developing the Periodic Table of the Development of Results. The formula is also called Purple Success. O'Reilly has an INFJ personality type.

== Awards ==
O'Reilly's the Homework Club was awarded O2 Ability Company status by international disability rights group Kanchi in 2010 along with Citi, EMC, Microsoft Ireland and Trinity College Dublin. Former President of Ireland and former United Nations High Commissioner for Human Rights Mary Robinson was on stage and the awards were broadcast live on Newstalk national radio. Dublin 15 Chamber presented her with two awards for Best New Business 2009 and Small Business of the Year 2010 for the Homework Club. The education centre was nominated for an AIB Innovation in Business Excellence award at the Fingal Business Excellence Awards 2011.

== Media ==
She called for homework to be banned in schools during an Irish national radio interview in studio with Derek Mooney on the Mooney show on RTÉ Radio One on 11 November 2011. Interviewed by Shane Coleman in studio on Irish national radio show The Right Hook broadcast on Newstalk on 29 October 2015 about plans to ban homework in Oslo, Norway she said Irish people should refuse to do homework and referenced homework boycotts in France.
