= Bridget =

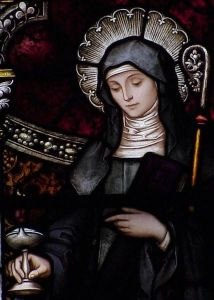
- St. Brigid of Kildare inspired the popularity of the name Bridget.
- Pronunciation: /ˈbrɪdʒɪt/ BRIJ-it

Origin
- Origin: Irish
- Meaning: Noble or exalted one

Other names
- Related names: Briget, Brigid, Brigitte, Birgit, Birgitta, Birgitte, Bridgette, Breda, Breada, Brigita,

Bridget is an Irish female name derived from the Gaelic noun brígh, meaning "power, strength, vigor, virtue". An alternative meaning of the name is "exalted one". Its popularity, especially in Ireland, is largely related to the popularity of Saint Brigid of Kildare, who was so popular in Ireland she was known as "Mary of the Gael". This saint took on many of the characteristics of the early Celtic goddess Brigid, who was the goddess of agriculture and healing and possibly also of poetry and fire. One of her epithets was "Brigid of the Holy Fire". In German and Scandinavian countries, the popularity of the name spread due to Saint Bridget of Sweden.

In the Irish language, the name is spelled Bríd or Brighid, pronounced [bʲɾʲiːdʲ]. In the Scottish Gaelic language, the name is spelled Brìghde, pronounced [ˈpɾʲiːʝtʲə]. At one time the name was so popular for Irish girls that Bridey was used as a slang term for an Irish girl in English-speaking countries. Some Irish servant girls were called Biddie or Biddy by their employers even if that was not their real first name. It has been steadily used in the United States throughout the 20th and 21st centuries, though never among the top 100 most popular names for girls. It was most popular in the 1970s, when it ranked as the 153rd most popular name for girls born in that decade in the United States. It was ranked as the 367th most common name for girls and women in the United States in the 1990 census.

== People with the name ==
- Bridget Adams (1928–2019), English figure skater
- Bridget Allchin (1927–2017), English archaeologist
- Bridget Andrews (born 1993), English jockey
- Bridget Archer (born 1975), Australian politician
- Bridget Armstrong (born 1937), New Zealand actress
- Bridget Atkinson (1732–1814), English farmer and shell collector
- Bridget S. Bade (born 1965), American judge and lawyer
- Bridget Barrett (died 1845), Irish murder victim
- Bridget Becker (born 1981), New Zealand curler
- Bridget Bedard, American producer and screenwriter
- Bridget Bendish (1650–1726), daughter of Bridget Cromwell
- Bridget Benenate, American songwriter
- Bridget Bevan (1698–1779), Welsh educationalist and public benefactor
- Bridget Bishop (c. 1632 – 1692), first person executed for witchcraft during the Salem witch trials
- Bridget Boakye, Ghanaian data scientist, entrepreneur, and writer
- Bridget Boland (1913–1988), Irish novelist, playwright, and screenwriter
- Bridget Breiner (born 1974), American choreographer and dancer
- Bridget M. Brennan (born 1974), American judge and lawyer
- Bridget Brind, British diplomat
- Bridget A. Brink, American diplomat
- Bridget Buckley (born 1955), English rower
- Bridget Burgess (born 2001), Australian stock car racing driver
- Bridget Calitz (born 1997), South African lawn bowler
- Bridget Callahan (born 1996), American soccer player
- Bridget Canning, Canadian writer
- Bridget Carleton (born 1997), Canadian basketball player
- Bridget Carey (born 1984), American technology journalist
- Bridget Carpenter, American playwright and screenwriter
- Bridget Carragher (born 1957), South African physicist
- Bridget Cherry (born 1941), English architectural historian
- Bridget Christie (born 1971), English actress, comedian, and writer
- Bridget Cleary (1867–1895), Irish woman murdered by her husband
- Bridget Connolly (1890–1981), Irish nationalist and republican
- Bridget R. Cooks, American academic, curator, scholar, and writer
- Bridget Cromwell (1624–1662), eldest daughter of Oliver Cromwell
- Bridget Dirrane (1894–2003), Irish memoirist and nurse
- Bridget Donahue, American art dealer
- Bridget Dowling (1891–1969), sister-in-law of Adolf Hitler
- Bridget Drinka (born 1951), American linguist
- Bridget Durity (born 1951), Trinidadian cricketer
- Bridget Dwyer (born 1980), American golfer
- Bridget Egerton (1577–1648), English religious writer
- Bridget Yamala Egwolosan (born 1970), Nigerian handball player
- Bridget Everett (born 1972), American comedian
- Bridget Flanery, American actress
- Bridget Flannery (born 1959), Irish painter
- Bridget Fonda (born 1964), American actress
- Bridget Franek (born 1987), American middle distance runner
- Bridget Gainer (born 1968/1969), American politician
- Bridget Galloway (born 1999), English football player
- Bridget Gilling (1922–2009), English–Australian activist and feminist
- Bridget Goodwin (c. 1827 – 1899), Irish–New Zealand goldminer
- Bridget Hall (born 1977), American model
- Bridget Hanley (1941–2021), American actress
- Bridget Haraldsdotter (c. 1131 – 1208), Queen consort of Sweden
- Bridget Harrison (born 1971), English freelance journalist
- Bridget Hodson, English actress
- Bridget Hoffman (born 1961/1962), American voice actress
- Bridget Holmes (1591–1691), English domestic servant
- Bridget Hustwaite (born 1991), Australian journalist and radio presenter
- Bridget Hutter, English sociologist
- Bridget Hyem (1933–2014), Australian equestrian
- Bridget Ikin, New Zealand producer
- Bridget Jackson (born 1936), English golfer
- Bridget Jones Nelson (born 1964), American actress and screenwriter
- Bridget Kahele (born 1996), American rugby player
- Bridget Karlin, American entrepreneur
- Bridget Katsriku, Ghanaian public servant
- Bridget Kearney (born 1985), American musician and songwriter
- Bridget Anne Kelly (born 1972), American political consultant
- Bridget Kelly (born 1986), American singer and songwriter
- Bridget Kendall (born 1956), English journalist
- Bridget Kumwenda (born 1991), Malawi netball player
- Bridget Terry Long (born 1973), American economics professor
- Bridget Lowe, American poet
- Bridget Maasland (born 1974), Dutch television presenter
- Bridget G. MacCarthy (1904–1993), Irish academic and writer
- Bridget Malcolm, Australian model
- Bridget Markham (1579–1609), English courtier
- Bridget Martyn (1935–2020), Egyptian–born English encyclopedist
- Bridget Masango (born 1962), South African politician
- Bridget Masinga (born 1981), South African actress, model, radio and television personality
- Bridget Marquardt (born 1973), American television personality
- Bridget McConnell (born 1958), Scottish cultural administrator
- Bridget Mary McCormack (born 1966), American judge, lawyer, and professor
- Bridget McDonough, American theatre director
- Bridget McEvilly (born 1946), English nursing administrator
- Bridget McKeever (born 1983), Irish field hockey player
- Bridget McKenzie (born 1969), Australian politician
- Bridget Minamore (born 1991). British critic, essayist, journalist and poet
- Bridget Moran (1923–1999), Canadian activist and author
- Bridget Motha (born 1986), South African soccer player
- Bridget Moynahan (born 1971), American actress and model
- Bridget Mutuma, Kenyan–South African nanotechnologist
- Bridget Namiotka (born 1990), American pair skater
- Bridget Neval (born 1985), Indian–born Australian–Canadian actress
- Bridget Newell (1911–1937), English barrister and golfer
- Bridget O'Connor (1961–2010), English author
- Bridget Parsons (1907–1972), English socialite
- Bridget Partridge (1890–1966), Irish–born Australian Catholic religious sister
- Bridget Pastoor (born 1940), Canadian politician
- Bridget Patterson (born 1994), Australian cricketer
- Bridget Perrier (born 1977), Canadian anti-prostitution activist
- Bridget Pettis (born 1971), American basketball player and coach
- Bridget Phillipson (born 1983), English politician
- Bridget Pickering, Namibian producer
- Bridget Pitt, Zimbabwean–born South African environmental activist and writer
- Bridget Plantagenet (1480–1507), English princess, seventh daughter of Edward IV and Elizabeth Woodville and religious.
- Bridget Plouffe, American politician
- Lady Bridget Poulett (1912–1975), English socialite
- Bridget Powers (born 1980), American pornographic actress with dwarfism
- Bridget Prentice, (born 1952), Scottish politician
- Bridget Redmond (1904–1952), Irish politician
- Bridget Regan (born 1982), American actress
- Bridget Reweti, New Zealand photographer and moving image artist
- Bridget Rice (1885–1967), Irish politician
- Bridget Riley (born 1931), English painter
- Bridget Robinson, New Zealand oncology academic
- Bridget Rosewell (born 1951), English economist
- Bridget Rowe (1950–2021), English newspaper editor
- Bridget Scanlon (born 1959), American hydrogeologist
- Bridget Sequeira (1905–1987), Pakistani religious sister
- Bridget Shield, researcher
- Bridget Sloan (born 1992), American artistic gymnast
- Bridget St John (born 1946), English singer and songwriter
- Bridget Stutchbury, Canadian biologist
- Bridget Tan (1948–2022), Singaporean activist
- Bridget Tolley (born 1960), Canadian Algonquin community worker
- Bridget Turner (1939–2014), English actress
- Bridget Vallence, Australian politician
- Bridget Valverde (born 1982), American politician
- Bridget Wade, English micropalaeontologist
- Bridget Walters, Australian actress
- Bridget Williams (born 1948), New Zealand publisher and founder of Bridget Williams Books
- Bridget Wishart (born 1962), English musician, singer, and performance artist

== Fictional characters ==
- Bridget (Guilty Gear), in the fighting game series Guilty Gear
- Bridget, supporting character in the film An American Tail
- Bridget Forrester, in the series The Bold and the Beautiful
- Bridget Hennessey, the eldest child on the sitcom 8 Simple Rules
- Bridget Jones, protagonist of the eponymous book series
- Bridget Kearns, a side character in the film Shutter Island
- Bridget O'Sullivan, a Season 2 contestant in Fetch! with Ruff Ruffman
- Bridget Tice, supporting character in the web series The Most Popular Girls in School
- Bridget Verdant/Mew Bridget, English dub name of Retasu Midorikawa/Mew Lettuce from Tokyo Mew Mew
- Bridget von Hammersmark, played by Diane Kruger in the film Inglourious Basterds
- Bridget "Bee" Vreeland, in the book and movie (played by Blake Lively) The Sisterhood of the Traveling Pants
- Bridget, the half-human/half-alien child of Harry Vanderspeigle in the sci-fi/comedy series Resident Alien
- Bridget "Jet" Owens, one of the witchy aunts in the book and movie Practical Magic
- Bridget "Bibi" Garvey, in the Apple TV+ series Bad Sisters
- Bridget, aka Lady Glitter Sparkles, a Bergen who works as a scullery maid in the animated film Trolls
- Bridget, the past version of Queen of Hearts in Descendants: The Rise of Red

== Variations ==
- Birgit (Estonian, Norwegian)
- Birgitta (Danish, Finnish, Icelandic, Indonesian, Norwegian, Swedish)
- Birgitte (Danish, Norwegian)
- Breeshey (Manx)
- Bridget (English)
- Bridgette (English)
- Bridgid (English)
- Bríd (Irish)
- Brídín (Irish)
- Bridzhit (Bulgarian, Russian)
- Bridzhyt (Ukrainian)
- Brìghde (Scottish Gaelic)
- Brighid (Irish)
- Brighidín (Irish)
- Brigid (Old Irish)
- Brígida (Catalan, Portuguese, Spanish)
- Brigida (Italian, Spanish)
- Brigit (Old Irish)
- Brigita (Croatian, Czech, Indonesian, Latvian, Lithuanian, Romanian, Slovenian)
- Brigitta (Dutch, German, Hungarian, Indonesian)
- Brigitte (French, German)
- Brita (Finnish)
- Britta (Danish, Norwegian, Swedish)
- Brygida (Polish)
- Ffraid (Welsh)
- Gitta (German)
- Gittan (Swedish)
- Gitte (Danish)
- Piret (Estonian)
- Piritta (Finnish)
- Pirjo (Finnish)
- Pirkko (Finnish)
- Priita (Finnish)
- Riitta (Finnish)

== See also ==
- Brigid (disambiguation)
- List of Irish-language given names

== Bibliography ==
- Rosenkrantz, Linda, and Satran, Pamela Redmond (2008). Cool Names for Babies. St. Martin's Griffin. ISBN 978-0-312-37786-1
- Todd, Loreto (1998). Celtic Names for Children. Irish American Book Company. ISBN 0-86278-556-1.
