= Britta (given name) =

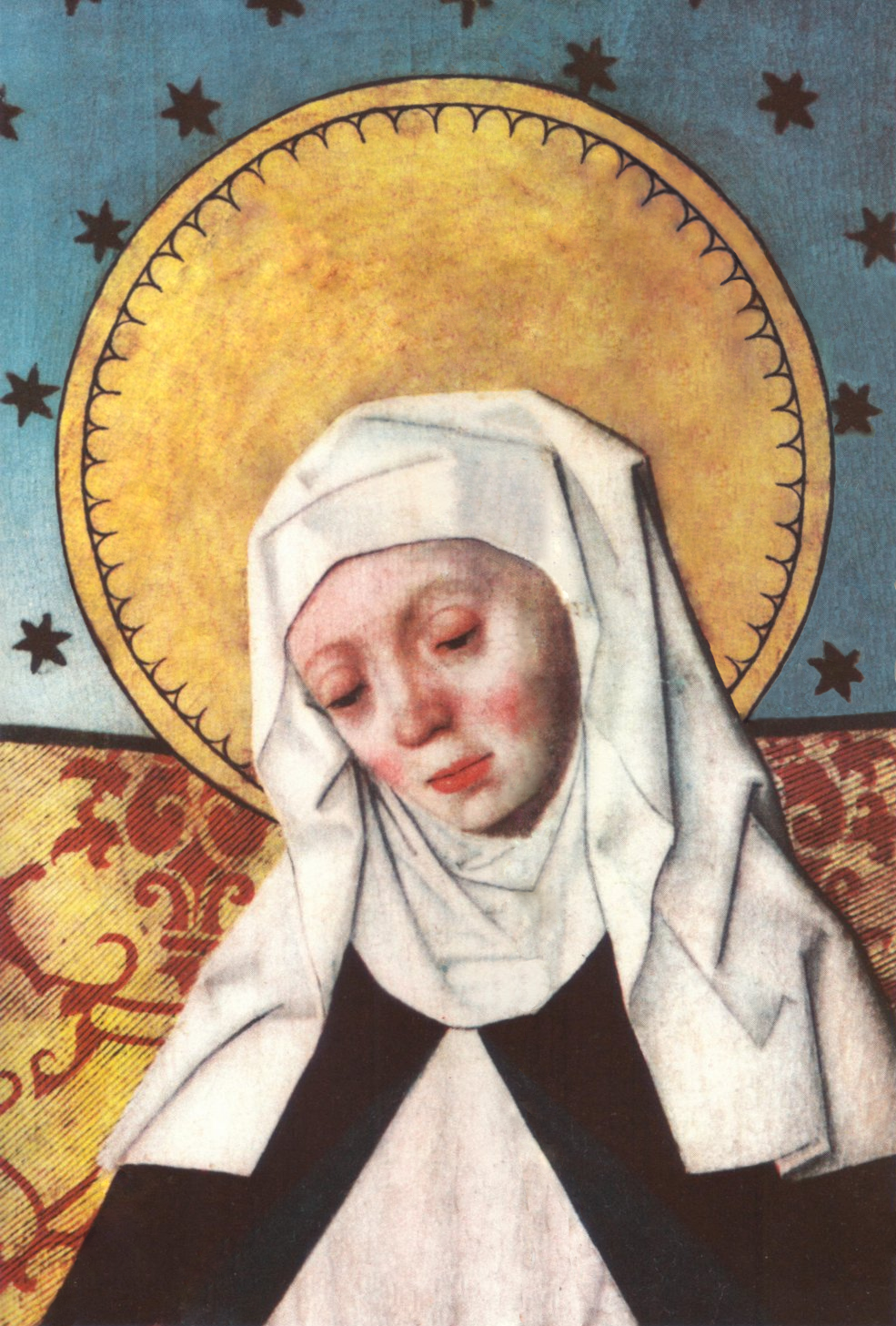
- St. Bridget of Sweden
- Gender: Female
- Language: Swedish

Origin
- Region of origin: Sweden

Other names
- Derived: Birgitta
- Related names: Birgitta, Birgit, Brighid, Bridget, Brigita

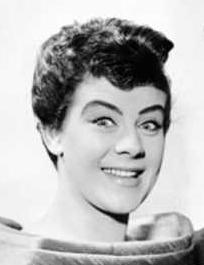
Brita Borg

Britta (also spelled Brita) is a female given name that is a variant of the Swedish name Birgitta, which is a form of the Irish Gaelic name Brighid (Bridget in English). The name Britta became popular in Scandinavia and Germany because of St. Bridget of Sweden.

== People named Britta ==
- Britta Andersen (born 1979), Danish badminton player
- Brita Borg (1926–2010), Swedish singer, actress, and variety show artist
- Britta Böhler, German-born Dutch politician
- Britta Curl (born 2000), American ice hockey player
- Britta Ernst (born 1961), German politician
- Brita Granström, Swedish painter and illustrator
- Britta Gröndahl, Swedish writer, translator, and anarchist
- Brita Hagberg, Swedish soldier
- Britta Heidemann, German épée fencer
- Britta Holmberg, Swedish actress
- Brita Horn, Swedish letter writer and courtier
- Brita Laurelia (1712–1784) was a Swedish publicist, book printer, and poet
- Britta Lejon, Swedish politician
- Brita Catharina Lidbeck, Swedish singer
- Britta Martin, German-born New Zealand triathlete
- Britta Nestler (born 1972), German materials scientist
- Britta Johansson Norgren, Swedish cross-country skier
- Britta Oellers (born 1973), German politician
- Britta Persson, Swedish singer/songwriter
- Britta Phillips, American musician and actress
- Britta Rådström, Swedish politician
- Britta Schwarz, German contralto
- Britta Seeger, German business executive
- Britta Soll, Estonian actress
- Britta Steffen, German swimmer
- Brita Tott, Danish and Swedish landowner, spy, and forger
- Brita Zippel, Swedish alleged witch
- Maura and Britta, 4th-century Christian martyrs

=== Fictional characters ===
- Britta, in the Groovy Girls doll line, by Manhattan Toy
- Britta, in the novel The Drifters
- Britta, in the novel Princess Academy by Shannon Hale
- Britta Beach, in the television series Riverdale
- Britta McMann, in the television series Go Girls
- Britta Perry, in the television series Community

== See also ==
- 1219 Britta, asteroid named in 1932
- Brita, German company that specializes in water filtration products
- Brittas (disambiguation), place name and surname
- Dean and Britta, American indie pop duo featuring Britta Phillips
