= Bridgett =

Bridgett may refer to:

== People ==
- George Arthur Bridgett (1882 – 1954), English footballer
- Bridgette Karen "Bridgett" Kern (born 1969), American worship musician and urban contemporary gospel recording artist
- Bridgett Riley (born 1973), American boxer and motion picture stuntwoman
- Bridgett Zehr (born c.1985), American ballet dancer
- Thomas Edward Bridgett (1829–1899), English priest and historical writer

== In business ==
- Hanson Bridgett, American law firm

== See also ==
- Bridget (disambiguation)
- Bridgette (disambiguation)
- Bridgit (disambiguation)
- Brigid (disambiguation)
- Brigitte (disambiguation)
