= Birgitta =

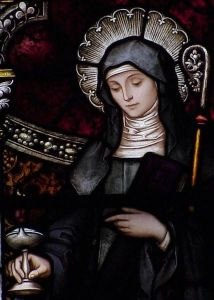
- Gender: Female
- Language: Swedish, Icelandic

Other names
- Derived: Brighid (Celtic goddess)
- Related names: Britta, Brigitte, Bridget, Brigita, Birgit

Birgitta is the Swedish and Icelandic form of the Irish Gaelic female name Brighid. Brighid or Brigid was the name of an ancient Celtic goddess, and its English form is Bridget. Birgitta and its alternate forms Birgit and Britta became common names in Scandinavia because of St. Bridget of Sweden.

People named Birgitta include:

- Bridget of Sweden (c. 1303–1373), also known as Birgitta Birgersdotter and Birgitta of Vadstena, Swedish Roman Catholic saint
- Princess Birgitta of Sweden (1937–2024), elder sister of King Carl XVI Gustaf
- Lasses Birgitta (died 1550), alleged Swedish witch, first woman executed for sorcery in Sweden
- Birgitta Andersson (1933–2026), Swedish actress and comedian
- Birgitta Dahl (1937–2024), Swedish politician
- Birgitta Durell (1619–1683), Dutch-born Swedish industrialist
- Birgitta Moran Farmer (1881–1939), American miniature painter
- Birgitta Haukdal (born 1979), Icelandic singer
- Birgitta Henriques-Normark (born 1958), Swedish physician and researcher
- Birgitta Hillingsø (born 1940), Danish antiques dealer and godmother of King Frederik X of Denmark
- Birgitta Johansson (born 1943), Swedish orienteering competitor
- Birgitta Jónsdóttir (born 1967), Icelandic politician
- Birgitta Ohlsson (born 1975), Swedish politician, former Minister for European Union Affairs
- Birgitta Pettersson (born 1939), Swedish actress
- Birgitta Rasmusson (1939–2021), Swedish television personality, baker and cookbook author
- Birgitta Steene (1928–2023), Swedish academic
- Birgitta Stenberg (1932–2014), Swedish author, translator and illustrator
- Birgitta Tolksdorf (1947–2024), German-born American actress
- Birgitta Trotzig (1929–2011), Swedish writer
- Birgitta Wallace (1934–2025), Swedish–Canadian archaeologist
- Birgitta Wolf (1913–2009), Swedish writer

== See also ==
- Birgithe, another given name
- Birgitte, another given name
- Brigid (disambiguation)
- Bridget
