= Gitta =

Gitta may refer to:

== Places ==
- Gita, Israel, communal settlement in Israel

== People ==
- Gitta Alpár (1903–1991), Hungarian opera singer
- Gitta Bauer (1919–1990), German journalist
- Gitta Connemann (born 1964), German politician
- Gitta Escher (born 1957), German gymnast
- Gitta Gradova (1904–1985), American pianist
- Gitta Gyenes (1888–1960), Hungarian painter
- Gitta Jensen (born 1972), Danish swimmer
- Gitta Jønsson (1869–1950), Norwegian politician
- Gitta Kutyniok (born 1972), German mathematician
- Gitta Lind (1925–1974), German singer and actor
- Gitta Mallasz (1907–1992), Hungarian graphic designer
- Brigitte Nielsen (born 1963), Danish actress and musician who has recorded as Gitta
- Gitta Sereny (1921–2012), Austrian-British biographer
- Gitta-Maria Sjöberg (born 1957), Swedish opera singer
- Gitta Steiner (1932–1990), American composer

== See also ==
- Gitta Discovers Her Heart, 1932 German musical film
