= Birgitte =

Birgitte is a feminine given name. It may refer to:

== People ==
- Birgitte Kiær Ahring (born 1953), Danish biologist and biofuel researcher
- Birgitte Alsted (born 1942), Danish violinist, teacher and composer
- Birgitte Andersen (1791–1875), Danish stage actress
- Birgitte Bak-Jensen, Danish 20th-21st century professor and researcher
- Birgitte Bonnesen (born 1956), Danish-Swedish former business executive, former chief executive officer of Swedbank
- Birgitte Cathrine Boye (1742–1824), Danish hymn writer
- Birgitte Einarsen (born 1975), Norwegian singer
- Birgitte Esmark (1841–1897), Norwegian malacologist considered the first Norwegian female zoologist
- Birgitte Federspiel (1925–2005), Danish actress
- Birgitte Sofie Gabel (1746–1769), Danish noblewoman noted for her beauty and intelligence who rejected attempts to make her the mistress of King Christian VII
- Birgitte Gøye (1511–1574), Danish county administrator, lady in waiting, landholder and noble, co-founder and principal of Herlufsholm School
- Birgitte Grimstad (born 1935), Danish-born Norwegian singer, guitarist, composer and writer
- Birgitte Karlsen Hagen (born 1994), Norwegian handball player
- Birgitte Haldorsdatter, last person confirmed to have been found guilty of witchcraft, in 1715, in Norway
- Birgitte Husebye (born 1973), Norwegian orienteering competitor
- Birgitte Jordahl (born 1965), Norwegian politician
- Birgitte Christine Kaas (1682–1761), Norwegian poet and translator of hymns
- Birgitte Krogsgaard (born 1991), Danish racing cyclist
- Birgitte Berg Nielsen (1861–1951), Danish educator and pioneering women's rights activist
- Birgitte Possing (born 1952), Danish historian
- Birgitte Price (1934–1997), Danish actress
- Birgitte Qvist-Sørensen (born 1961), Danish theologian
- Birgitte Raaberg, Danish actress
- Birgitte Reimer (1926–2021), Danish film actress
- Birgitte Rosenkrantz (died 1603), Danish noblewoman executed for committing what was then considered incest with her late husband's nephew
- Birgitte Sættem (born 1978), Norwegian retired handball player
- Birgitte Hjort Sørensen (born 1982), Danish actress
- Birgitte Victoria Svendsen (born 1957), Norwegian actress
- Birgitte Thott (1610–1662), Danish writer, scholar and feminist
- Birgitte Wilbek (1928–2025), Danish handball and basketball player
- Birgitte Winther (1751–1809), Danish stage actress and opera singer
- Birgitte, Duchess of Gloucester (born 1946), Danish-born member of the British royal family

== Fictional characters ==
- Birgitte Nyborg, protagonist of the Danish TV series Borgen

== See also ==
- Birgitta, another given name
- Birgithe, another given name
