= Birgit =

Female given name

- Gender: Female

Other names
- Related names: Birgitta, Birgitte, Bridget, Bridgette, Bergit, Berjit

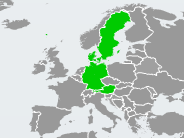
Popularity of name Birgit

Birgit is a female given name, a short form of Birgitta and ultimately a Germanic form of the Gaelic name Bridget. Notable people with the name include:

- Birgit Brüel, Danish singer and actress
- Birgit Cramon Daiber (born 1944), German politician
- Birgit Collin-Langen, German politician
- Birgit Cunningham, Anglo-American activist
- Birgit Doll, Austrian actress and theatre director
- Birgit Finnilä, Swedish opera singer
- Birgit Fischer, German canoer
- Birgit Fogh-Andersen (1922–2012), Danish politician
- Birgit Friedmann (born 1960), German runner and 1980 world champion
- Birgit Hogefeld, German RAF terrorist member
- Birgit Kähler, German high jumper
- Birgit Meyer (born 1960), Dutch religious studies scholar
- Birgit Michels, German badminton player
- Birgit Minichmayr, Austrian actress
- Birgit Nilsson (1918–2005), Swedish soprano
- Birgit Prinz, German football (soccer) player
- Birgit Püve, Estonian photographer
- Birgit Rausing, Swedish art historian
- Birgit Ridderstedt, Swedish singer
- Birgit Sarrap, Estonian singer
- Birgit Schrowange, German television presenter
- Birgit Schuurman, Dutch rock singer
- Birgit Skarstein, Norwegian Paralympic athlete
- Birgit Strøm (1931–2007), Norwegian actress and puppeteer
- Birgit Thumm, German volleyball player
- Birgit Vogel-Heuser (born 1961), German computer scientist
- Birgit Zotz, Austrian writer and anthropologist

== See also ==
- 960 Birgit, a minor planet orbiting the Sun
- Birgit language
- Brigid (disambiguation)
