= Atlantic-ACM =

American telecommunications consultancy

- Company type: Privately held company
- Industry: Telecommunications industry
- Founded: 1991; 35 years ago
- Founder: Judy Reed Smith
- Headquarters: Boston, Massachusetts
- Key people: Dr. Judy Reed Smith, Fedor Smith
- Services: Telecommunications and information technology market research and benchmarking, management consulting
- Website: www.atlantic-acm.com

Atlantic-ACM is an American research consultancy serving the telecommunications and information technology industries. The company is based in Boston and its primary focuses is on business strategy and business research for the telecommunications industry. This involves studies and reports on sizing, benchmarking and market share.

The company is best-recognized for its "Excellence" awards, which are derived from its annual benchmarking studies.

== History ==
Atlantic-ACM was founded in 1991 by Judy Reed Smith, a Harvard-educated strategist who tackled her first telecommunications industry project in 1987 and worked for such consultancies as Gray Judson Howard (offshoot of Arthur D. Little) and Mercer Management Consulting.

After generating some of the competitive telecommunications industry's first sizing and share forecasts, Reed Smith was recognized as an industry influencer, based largely on the firm's research and become a trusted data source in resources ranging from industry trades to The Wall Street Journal. By 2000, she was recognized within the industry as a "mastermind" and her firm an industry "braintrust".

In 2002, Reed Smith was the first supplier member appointed to the board of directors for the Association of Communications Enterprises (ASCENT), which later became the Internet and Competitive Networks Association (INCOMPAS). In 2009, Atlantic-ACM president Fedor Smith became a featured columnist for xchange magazine and later for RCR Wireless News.

== Benchmarking ==
The company's benchmarking research practice includes annual studies across numerous industry segments at the wholesale and retail levels. Awards derived from that research are promoted by brands that win them in their public relations, marketing and investor relations activities.
