= Brigitte =

- Gender: Female

Origin
- Origin: Irish
- Meaning: Strong-willed

Other names
- Related names: Bridget, Brigid, Brigitta, Birgit

Brigitte is a feminine given name. Notable people with the name include:

- Brigitte Amm, German rower
- Brigitte Bardot (1934–2025), French actress, singer, model, and animal rights activist
- Brigitte Becue (born 1972), Belgian breaststroke swimmer
- Brigitte Bierlein (born 1949), Austrian jurist and politician
- Brigitte Cuypers (born 1955), South African tennis player
- Brigitte Engerer (1952–2012), French pianist
- Brigitte Fossey (born 1946), French actress
- Brigitte Foster-Hylton (born 1974), Jamaican hurdling athlete
- Brigitte Fronzek (1952–2021) German SPD politician
- Brigitte Gabriel, Lebanese-American activist and founder of hate group ACT
- Brigitte Girardin (born 1953), French diplomat and politician
- Brigitte Gonthier-Maurin (born 1956), French politician
- Brigitte Haentjens, French-born Canadian theatre director
- Brigitte Hamann (1940–2016), German-Austrian historian
- Brigitte Laganière (born 1996), Canadian ice hockey player
- Brigitte Lahaie (born 1955), French porn actress
- Brigitte Lin (born 1954), Taiwanese actress
- Brigitte Macron (born 1953), Emmanuel Macron's wife
- Brigitte Millar, English actress
- Brigitte Mira (1910–2005), German actress
- Brigitte Mohnhaupt (born 1949), German Red Army Faction member
- Brigitte Nansoz (born 1962), Swiss alpine skier
- Brigitte Nielsen (born 1963), Danish actress
- Brigitte Poupart, Canadian actress and filmmaker
- Brigitte Rintisch, German rower
- Brigitte Sauriol (born 1945), Canadian film director and screenwriter
- Brigitte Seiwald (born 1945), Austrian alpine skier
- Brigitte Somfleth (born 1953), German politician
- Brigitte Soucy (born 1972), Canadian volleyball player
- Brigitte Steden (1949–1999), Former West German badminton player
- Brigitte Tamar, also known as Gitte Tamar, American horror fiction novelist
- Brigitte Tsobgny (born 1961), Cameroonian author, educator
- Brigitte Affidehome Tonon, Beninois researcher, author, basketball coach and former player

== Fictional people ==
- Brigitte Lindholm, character in the 2016 video game Overwatch
- Brigitte Fitzgerald, character in the Ginger Snaps film trilogy
- Brigitte "Spucki" Spuck, a character in the 2004 parody film Traumschiff Surprise – Periode 1
- Brigitta von Trapp, a character played by Angela Cartwright in the musical The Sound of Music
- Brigitte Winkelmann, a character played by Lavinia Wilson in the German TV series' "Deutschland 86 & Deutschland 89"

== See also ==
- Birgitte, Duchess of Gloucester, wife of Prince Richard, Duke of Gloucester
- Gitta (disambiguation)
