= Mutuma =

Mutuma is a surname. Notable people with the surname include:

- Bridget Mutuma, Kenyan nanotechnologist
- Harry Mutuma Kathurima (born 1952), Kenyan diplomat
- Nick Mutuma, Kenyan actor
- Rodreck Mutuma (born 1988), Zimbabwean footballer

== See also ==
- Mutuma Ruteere, former United Nations special rapporteur for Racism, Racial Discrimination, Xenophobia and Related Intolerance
