= Peter Connolly =

Peter Connolly may refer to:

- Peter Connolly (judge) (1920–2009), Australian politician and judge in Queensland
- Peter Connolly (New South Wales politician) (1890–1959), member of the New South Wales Legislative Assembly
- Peter Connolly (footballer) (1868–1895), Scottish footballer
- Peter Connolly (classical scholar) (1935–2012), British classical scholar, military history author and artist
- Peter Connolly, criminal convicted of the murder of Christopher Alaneme
- Peter Connolly, father of Irish nationalist and republican Bridget Connolly
- Peter Connolly, figure in landscape urbanism

== See also ==
- Peter Connelly (disambiguation)
