= Gyenes =

Gyenes is a surname. Notable people with the surname include:

- Emanuel Gyenes (born 1984), Romanian motorcyclist;
- Gitta Gyenes (1887–1960), Hungarian painter and graphic artist;
- Gyula Gyenes (1911–1988), Hungarian sprinter.
