= Brigita =

- Gender: Female
- Name day: 23 July (Lithuanian)

Origin
- Region of origin: Lithuania, Slovenia

Other names
- Related names: Bridget, Brigid, Brigitte, Birgitta

Brigita is predominantly a Lithuanian and Slovenian feminine given name. Individuals bearing the name Brigita include:

- Brigita Brezovac (born 1979), Slovenian bodybuilder
- Brigita Bukovec (born 1970), Slovenian hurdler
- Brigita Ivanauskaitė (born 1993), Lithuanian handball player
- Brigita Langerholc (born 1976), Slovenian middle distance runner
- Brigita Ozolins, Australian installation artist and art educator
- Brigita Schmögnerová (born 1947), Slovak economist and politician
- Brigita Virbalytė-Dimšienė (born 1985), Lithuanian race walker
- Brigita Vuco (born 1999), Croatian singer-songwriter
