= Brigid Carroll =

New Zealand professor of management

Academic background
- Education: University of Auckland
- Thesis: Mapping the Professional Who Manages: Identity, Narrative and Spatiality (2003)

Academic work
- Institutions: University of Auckland

Brigid Jan Carroll is a New Zealand management academic, and is a full professor at the University of Auckland, specialising in leadership identity and practice, organisational theory and qualitative research methods.

== Academic career ==
Carroll completed a PhD titled Mapping the Professional Who Manages: Identity, Narrative and Spatiality at the University of Auckland. Carroll then joined the faculty of the Department of Management and International Business at the University of Auckland, rising to full professor and giving her inaugural lecture in 2021. She holds the Fletcher Building Employee Educational Fund Chair in Leadership, and is the third person to do so, after Brad Jackson and Kevin Low.

Carroll is interested in leadership, and has researched different leadership practices and mindsets, as well as how people in leadership can support and encourage leadership around them, creating a leadership team. She also teaches organisational theory and qualitative research methods, and was part of a research collaboration with Professor Kerr Inkson around how compliance issues were affecting boards of directors in New Zealand. She said, "Ironically we might be in a world of too many leaders and not enough leadership. Research has already started to explore ‘anti-leadering’ and ‘leaderlessness’ as proactive strategies to create more leadership. Therefore we need to move beyond feeling like a leader all or even most of the time. There is a far larger repertoire possible."

Carroll is an associate editor on the journal Leadership, and has published three co-edited books. She has co-convened at the European Group of Organization Studies, and was invited to teach PhD courses at the Copenhagen Business School. In 2014 and 2020 she was awarded the University of Auckland Business School Research Excellence Award, and received a teaching award in 2019.

== Selected works ==
- Carroll, Brigid Jan; Levy, Lester; Richmond, David (2008). "Leadership as Practice: Challenging the Competency Paradigm". Leadership. 4 (4): 363–379. doi:10.1177/1742715008095186. Wikidata Q58155358.
- Carroll, Brigid Jan; Levy, Lester (2010). "Leadership Development as Identity Construction". Management Communication Quarterly. 24 (2): 211–231. doi:10.1177/0893318909358725. Wikidata Q58155346.
- Simpson, Barbara; Carroll, Brigid Jan (2008). "Re-viewing `Role' in Processes of Identity Construction". Organization. 15 (1): 29–50. doi:10.1177/1350508407084484. Wikidata Q58155362.
- Carroll, Brigid Jan; Levy, Lester (2008). "Defaulting to Management: Leadership Defined By What It Is Not". Organization. 15 (1): 75–96. doi:10.1177/1350508407084486. Wikidata Q58155355.
- Nicholson, Helen; Carroll, Brigid Jan (2013). "Identity undoing and power relations in leadership development". Human Relations. 66 (9): 1225–1248. doi:10.1177/0018726712469548. Wikidata Q57984700.
- Kennedy, Fiona; Carroll, Brigid Jan; Francoeur, Joline (2012). "Mindset not skill set: Evaluating in new paradigms of leadership development". Advances in Developing Human Resources. 15 (1): 10–26. doi:10.1177/1523422312466835. Wikidata Q58155329.
