= Bridget (disambiguation) =

Bridget is a feminine given name.

Bridget may also refer to:

- Bridget (Guilty Gear), a fictional video game character
- Bridget (horse), a racehorse
- "Bridget" (Ray Donovan), a 2013 television episode

== See also ==
- Brigid or Brighid
- Bridgit (disambiguation)
- Brigitte (disambiguation)
- Saint Birgitta of Sweden
