= Peter Connelly (disambiguation) =

Peter Connelly may refer to:

- the baby Peter Connelly, see Killing of Peter Connelly
- Peter Connelly, video games composer

== See also ==
- Peter Connolly (disambiguation)
