= Birgithe =

Birgithe is a feminine given name which may refer to:

- Birgithe Kosovic (born 1972), Danish journalist and author
- Birgithe Kühle (1762–1832), Danish journalist and managing editor, considered the first female journalist in Norway

== See also ==
- Birgitta, another given name
- Birgitte, another given name
