= Bridget Karlin =

American entrepreneur and business woman

- Occupation(s): Entrepreneur, Businesswoman
- Employer: IBM Global Technology Services
- Notable work: General Manager, Internet of Things (IoT) Strategy at Intel
- Title: Chief Technology Officer, Global Managing Director, Vice President
- Awards: Women in Consumer Technology Legacy Award (2019), National Technology Humanitarian Award (2019)

Bridget Karlin is an American entrepreneur and business woman. She is currently Chief Technology Officer, Global Managing Director, and Vice President of IBM Global Technology Services. She has been the independent director on the board of Dana Incorporated since 2019.

Before working at IBM, Karlin served as general manager of the Internet of Things (IoT) Strategy and Integrated Products Division, and Hybrid Cloud Services at Intel. Karlin was named one of the top 50 Industrial IoT (IIoT) 5G Industrialists and Innovators in 2016 by RCR Wireless News. She was one of four to win in the category of Women in Industrial IoT 5G.

In 2017, Karlin appeared at the Consumer Electronics Show (CES), promoting the Internet of Things. At the 2019 show, she received the Women in Consumer Technology Legacy Award – an organization that honors women who are transforming the consumer technology industry. Karlin went on to serve as the Master of Ceremonies for the 2020 Women in Consumer Technology Legacy Awards. In 2019, Karlin was also the recipient of the National Technology Humanitarian Award from the Anti-Defamation League at their annual Industry Awards Gala.

Karlin is a supporter of Artificial Intelligence and believes that in 2030, the technology will add $30 trillion to the global economy. She appeared virtually at the 2021 CES alongside Jeremy Kaplan to promote AI, where she explained its use in solving world issues such as pollution of the oceans.
