= Brigitte (disambiguation) =

Brigitte is a feminine given name.

Brigitte may also refer to:

- Brigitte (dog), a French Bulldog dog actress
- Brigitte (duo), a French musical duo consisting of Aurélie "Maggiori" Saada and Sylvie Hoarau
- Brigitte (magazine), a German magazine for women
- Brigitte (Overwatch), a fictional character in the video game Overwatch
- Sainte-Brigitte, a commune of Morbihan, Brittany, France
- Willie Brigitte (born 1968), French terrorist
- Maman Brigitte, one of the loa

== See also ==
- Brigitte et Brigitte, a 1966 French film
- Bridget (disambiguation)
