= Brittas =

Brittas may refer to:

== Places in the Republic of Ireland ==
- Brittas, County Cork, two separate townlands in the Barony of Ibane and Barryroe
- Brittas, County Cork, a townland in the Barony of Duhallow
- Brittas, County Dublin, a village and townland in South County Dublin, Barony of Uppercross
- Brittas, County Kilkenny a townland in the Barony of Crannagh, County Kilkenny
- Brittas, County Laois, a townland in the Barony of Tinnahinch, County Laois
- Brittas, County Laois, a townland in the Barony of Portnahinch, County Laois
- Brittas, County Limerick, a townland in the Barony of Clanwilliam, County Limerick
- Brittas, County Louth, a townland in the Barony of Ferrard, County Louth
- Brittas, County Mayo, a townland in the Barony of Kilmaine, County Mayo
- Brittas, County Meath, a townland in the Barony of Morgallion, County Meath
- Brittas, County Tipperary, three separate townlands in County Tipperary in the Baronies of Eliogarty, Iffa and Offa East and Middlethird
- Brittas, County Westmeath, two separate townlands in County Westmeath in the Baronies of Kilkenny West and Moyashel and Magheradernon
- Brittas, County Wexford, a townland in the Barony of Forth, County Wexford
- Brittas, County Wicklow, three separate townlands in County Wicklow in the Baronies of Lower Talbotstown, Upper Talbotstown and Arklow
- Brittas Bay, County Wicklow, a beach on the Irish sea coast

== Other ==
- Brittas Castle, principal seat of the Dunne family
- Gordon Brittas, a character in The Brittas Empire, a British sitcom
- John Brittas (born 1966), Indian journalist

== See also ==
- Britta
