= Bjarne Amdahl =

Norwegian pianist, composer and orchestra conductor (1903–1968)

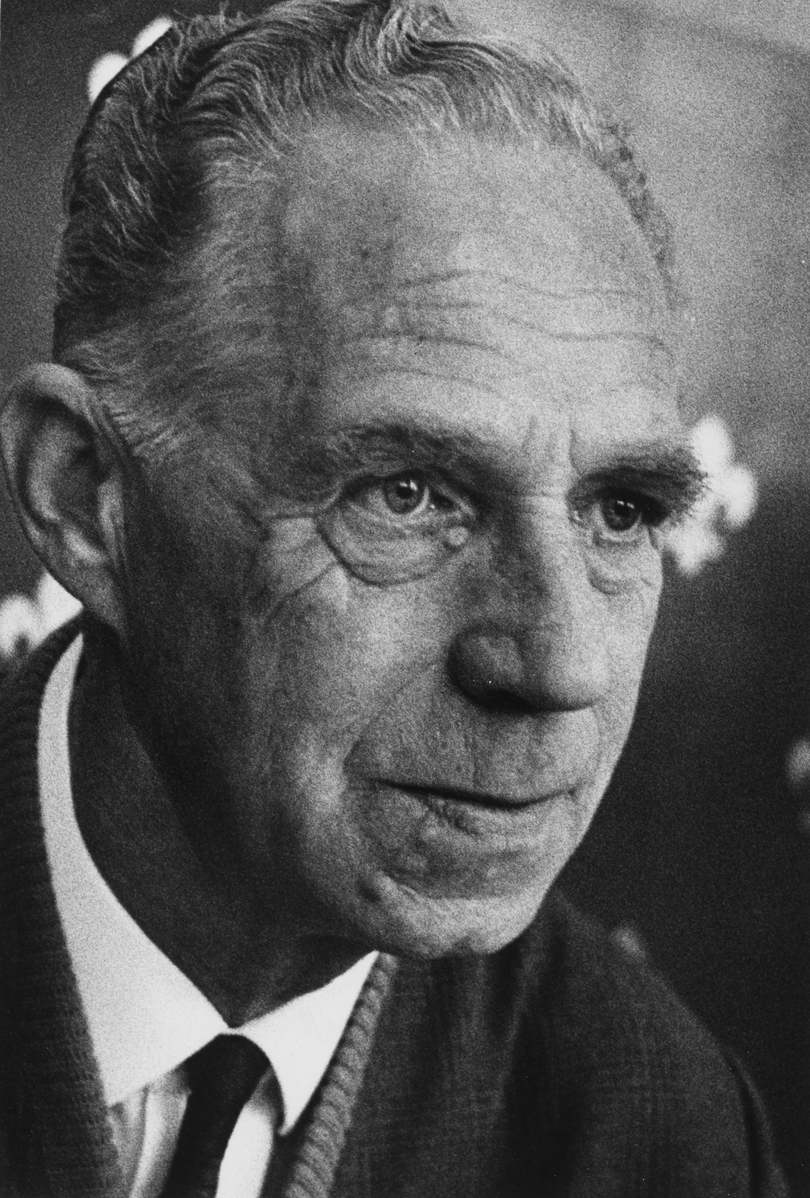
- Born: 17 August 1903; Trondheim, Norway
- Died: 14 April 1968 (aged 64); Bærum
- Occupations: Pianist, composer and orchestra conductor
- Relatives: Gitta Jønsson (mother-in-law)

Bjarne Fredrik Berg Amdahl (17 August 1903 – 14 April 1968) was a Norwegian pianist, composer and orchestra conductor.

== Personal life ==
Amdahl was born to Seddeltrykkeriet (banknote printers) chairman Hans Amdahl (1875–1945) and Gyda Sawert (1877–1957) in Trondheim. In 1931 he married the dancer Bengta Andrea Jønsson (11 May 1910 – 3 September 2003), daughter of furniture shop keeper Andreas Jønsson (1871–1940) and politician Gitta Jønsson (b. Hagerup, 1869–1950). He died in Bærum in 1968.

== Career ==
Amdahl studied piano under Melvin Simonsen, composition under Arvid Kleven and conducting under Hugo Kramm. Already when 20 years old, Amdahl was employed as orchestra conductor (kapellmester) at the Operette Theater Mayol in Kristiania (now Oslo) in 1923. Later he was a kapellmester at a number of Oslo theaters, like the Casino (1926–28), Chat Noir (1928–31), Søylen (1934–35), Det Nye Teater (1936–51), Folketeatret (1952–59), and then by Oslo Nye Teater. From 1940 he also had permanent assignments as a composer, pianist and organizer at the Norwegian national broadcaster NRK.

He was one of Norway's most popular composers of entertainment music in the 20th century, and among his most popular music were melodies to the songs "Tango for to" and "Sønnavindsvalsen" with lyrics by Alf Prøysen, and the song "Skomværvalsen" with lyrics by Erik Bye.
