= Gitta Jønsson =

Norwegian politician (1869–1950)

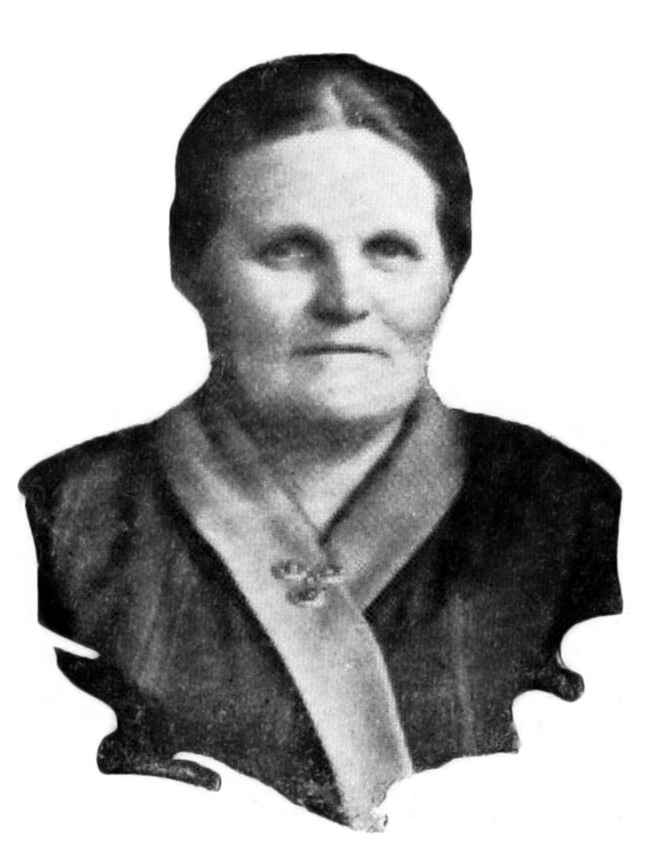
- Born: Gitta Lovise Hagerup; 5 October 1869; Tromsøysund, Norway
- Died: 6 March 1950 (aged 80); Oslo, Norway
- Occupation(s): Café owner and politician
- Relatives: Bjarne Amdahl (son-in-law)

Gitta Jønsson (5 October 1869 – 6 March 1950) was a Norwegian Labour Party politician and proponent for women's rights.

== Early and personal life ==
Jønsson was born in Tromsøysund Municipality, a daughter of Johan Widding Larsen Hagerup and Eline Marie Moe. As a young woman she worked as housemaid in Tromsø and Kristiania, and was eventually running a milk shop along with her sister. She married saddle maker Anders Jønsson in 1903, and they settled in Tromsø, where he established a workshop and she opened a café. Their daughter Bengta Andrea married composer Bjarne Amdahl.

== Political career ==
Jønsson joined the Labour Party in 1909, and founded Tromsø Arbeiderkvinneforening in 1911. Taking part in local politics, she was elected member of the city council of Tromsø Municipality from 1913 to 1925. She was a member of the board of the Norwegian Labour Party from 1923 to 1945, and chaired the Northern Troms chapter for many years. She was elected deputy member to the Storting for the period 1934–1945.

She died in Oslo on 6 March 1950, aged 80.

== Literature ==
- Skogheim, Dag (1978). Kvinner i nordnorsk arbeiderbevegelse: Gitta Jønsson.
