= Birgitte Kiær Ahring =

Danish biologist

- Citizenship: Denmark
- Education: Cand.scient. in Biology and PhD in Microbiology from University of Copenhagen
- Occupations: professor and Researcher at Aalborg University and researcher at Washington State University
- Employer(s): Aalborg University & Washington State University

Birgitte Kiær Ahring (born July 22, 1953) is a Danish biologist and researcher in biofuel. Since 2008, she has been employed as a professor at the Department of Chemistry and Bioscience at Aalborg University Copenhagen.

== Education ==
Ahring graduated as cand.scient. in biology at Copenhagen University in 1982. In 1986, she acquired a PhD in microbiology, also from Copenhagen University.

== Career ==
In 1986, Ahring became head-scientist at ‘The Nordic Council of Ministers’ biofuel research program. Also, she was employed at the Technical Folk High School of Denmark the same year.

Ahring started working as an environmental consultant at the United Nations (UN) focusing on Africa and Asia in 1992. The following year, in 1993, she was employed as a lecturer in environmental engineering at Technical University of Denmark.

In 1997, she started working as a professor in environmental engineering at University of California, Los Angeles, US, and at the same time worked at the research center, Biocentrum, at the Technical University of Denmark.

In 2004, Ahring became the leader of the Danish Center for Biofuels. Later, in 2006, she became the chief executive and owner of the company, Biogasol. Simultaneously, she started leading the Maxifuel project at the Technical University of Denmark.

As part of a collaboration between Washington State University and Aalborg University to develop a new type of biofuel, Ahring was employed as the director of both research centres, in 2008.
