= Bridget Boakye =

Ghanaian entrepreneur

Bridget Boakye is a Ghanaian entrepreneur, data scientist and writer. She co-founded TalentsinAfrica, one of Africa's fastest-growing skills accelerator and recruitment platforms. Her company was among the top 20 companies selected in October 2019 for the Harambe Entrepreneur Alliance at Bretton Woods, New Hampshire. Her company also emerged as one of the top three start-up companies at the Oxford University Africa Innovation Fair.

== Early years and education ==
Bridget Boakye
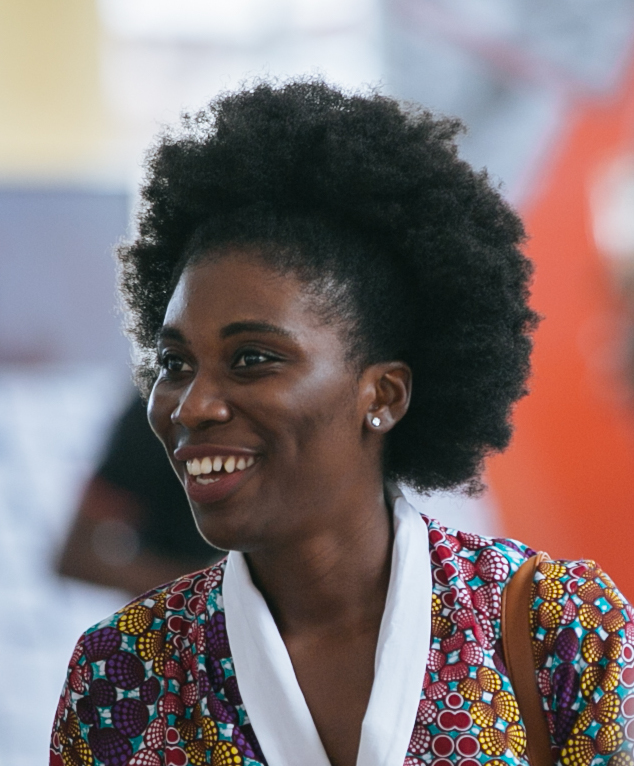
- Born: Ghana
- Citizenship: Ghana
- Education: Swarthmore College
- Occupations: entrepreneur, data scientist and writer
- Employer: TalentsinAfrica

Bridget was born and raised in Ghana. She moved to the United States to live with her parents when she was ten years old and completed her tertiary education at Swarthmore College, graduating with a bachelor's degree in economics.

== Works ==
She was an editor at She Leads Africa where she mostly debated on African history, women, economics and entrepreneurship. In Ghana, she co-founded TalentsinAfrica and ChaleKasa. TalentsinAfrica is an AI-backed recruitment platform democratizing access to opportunity for young Africans, while ChaleKasa is a bespoke events company curating experiences to connect Diasporans and Africans. She is also the co-founder of the Women's Corner GH and the strategist for Africans on China.

== Recognitions ==
- She is an Amplify Africa Fellow
- She is a member of the Global Shapers Accra Hub.
- She was named a Frank 5 Fellow of Swarthmore College, 2018–2019
- Hamambe Alliance Entrepreneur Associate, 2019
