= Brigitte Fronzek =

German politician (1952–2021)

Brigitte Fronzek (July 16, 1952, Pinneberg — November 13, 2021), née Kunstmann, was a German SPD politician and mayor of Elmshorn from 1996 to 2013.

== Life ==
Brigitte Fronzek studied from 1971 to 1975 in Kiel Law and received her doctorate in 1979. She then worked as a lawyer and notary. From 1975 to 1984, she was married to the lawyer Norbert Hempel, with whom she co-authored a commentary on the Schleswig-Holstein Municipal Tax Act.

In 1995, she was elected mayor of Elmshorn. She was re-elected in 2001 and 2007, the last time with 83.2%. After 18 years in office, she did not stand for another term. Her successor was elected on September 22, 2013, with 81.9% of the vote Volker Hatje (non-party), who took office on January 1, 2014.

Her candidacy for the office of district administrator of the district of Pinneberg failed in the direct district administrator election (run-off) on March 30, 2003, with Wolfgang Grimme (CDU) won with 53.6% of the votes cast against Brigitte Fronzek (46.4%).

In 2010, Fronzek applied to be the top candidate in the state election in Schleswig-Holstein 2012. The party's internal election for the nomination for the office of Minister President was organized for the first time by a members' vote, in which four candidates competed: In addition to Fronzek himself, these were Kiel Mayor Torsten Albig, state parliament member and former state interior minister Ralf Stegner and Mathias Stein, chairman of the staff council at the Kiel Canal administration in Kiel. Fronzek came third in the primary election with 9.1% of the valid votes cast, behind Albig (57.2%) and Stegner (32.2%).

Together with the CDU Member of Parliament Ole Schröder, she has campaigned intensively for bureaucracy reduction in Schleswig-Holstein since 2004.

She was married and left behind two children.
