= Organization (journal) =

- Discipline: Management, organization studies
- Language: English
- Edited by: Raza Mir, Patrizia Zanoni

Publication details
- History: 1994-present
- Publisher: SAGE Publications
- Frequency: Bimonthly
- Impact factor: 3.0 (2022)

Standard abbreviations
- ISO 4: Organization

Indexing
- ISSN: 1350-5084 (print); 1461-7323 (web)
- LCCN: 95660001
- OCLC no.: 300930411

Links
- Journal homepage; Online access; Online archive

Organization is a peer-reviewed academic journal that covers the field of management and organization studies. The editors-in-chief are Raza Mir (William Paterson University) and Patrizia Zanoni (Hasselt University). It was established in 1994 and is published by SAGE Publications.

== Abstracting and indexing ==
The journal is abstracted and indexed in Scopus, and the Social Sciences Citation Index. According to the Journal Citation Reports, its 2022 impact factor is 3.0, ranking it 166 out of 227 journals in the category "Management".
