= Britta Oellers =

German politician (born 1973)

Member of the Landtag of North Rhine-Westphalia
- Incumbent
- Assumed office 1 June 2017
- Preceded by: Ulrich Hahnen
- Constituency: Krefeld I – Viersen III

Personal details
- Born: 14 October 1973 (age 52) Kempen
- Party: Christian Democratic Union (since 1991)

Britta Oellers (born 14 October 1973 in Kempen) is a German politician serving as a member of the Landtag of North Rhine-Westphalia since 2017. She has been a city councillor of Krefeld since 1999. From 1994 to 2004, she served as chairwoman of the Young Union in Fischeln.
