= Birgitte Rosenkrantz =

Danish noblewoman (died 1603)

Birgitte Rosenkrantz (died 29 June 1603 in Copenhagen), was a Danish noblewoman, known as a figure of a cause célèbre.

She was married to the noble Niels Kaas of Stårupgård. After the death of her husband, she had a love affair with the nephew of her late husband, Gjord Kaas. Though they were not related, this was regarded as incest by contemporary law. Birgitte Rosenkrantz was executed by decapitation for incest. Her lover escaped, but was finally arrested in 1616 and executed as well. Birgitte Rosenkrantz became a figure of folklore and the subject of a ghost legend, according to which she is said to haunt Stårupgård in search of her children with her lover.

== Sources ==
- Danmarks Adels Aarbog, 1985-87 edition
