= Gitta Bauer =

German journalist (1919–1990)

- Born: 1919; Berlin, Weimar Republic
- Died: 1990 (aged 70–71)
- Occupation: Journalist

Gitta Bauer (born 1919 in Berlin, died 1990) was a German journalist.

== Opposing Nazism ==
She was born into a liberal family and raised a Catholic. She was a member of a Catholic movement, that was banned by the Nazis in 1935. Some years later, she was sent to prison for publishing a small newspaper with six friends, that advocated peace.

In 1944, her childhood friend, Ilse Baumgart, who was half Jewish and lived in Berlin under an assumed identity, where she worked as a secretary, got into great trouble. Upon hearing of the 20 July plot, she asked "Is the swine (Hitler) dead? Then the war is finally over". Her comment was reported, but the officer who came to arrest her was himself opposed to the Nazis, and gave her 15 minutes to escape. She was then hidden for the next nine months in the home of Gitta Bauer. Bauer later recounted: "This was no big moral or religious decision. She was a friend and she needed help. We knew it was dangerous, and we were careful, but we didn't consider not taking her".

In 1984 Gitta Bauer was honored as a "Righteous among the Nations" by Yad Vashem for saving her friend. She was initially in doubt about accepting the honor, not feeling she did anything extraordinary, but eventually she did.

== Opposing communism ==
In 1945, she met her husband, Leo Bauer (1912–1972), a Jewish communist veteran. In 1950 their son was born in East Berlin. The same year Leo Bauer was arrested together with his wife Gitta and his sister-in-law Hilde Dubro (who happened to be visiting them at the time) by the communist regime, accused of being an American spy, and sent to a Gulag concentration camp in Siberia. Gitta Bauer was imprisoned by the Stasi for circa 3 years, first at Bautzen and then at the Waldheim women's prison. Following her release, she became an ardent anti-communist, escaping to West Germany, where she worked as a journalist for the Springer Foreign News Service. She was joined in West Germany by her husband, who became a social democrat and a journalist for the West German magazine Stern.
