= Britta Schwarz =

German contralto (born 1964)

Britta Schwarz (born 1964) is a German contralto from Neubrandenburg, Mecklenburg-Vorpommern. Between 1980 and 1983 she studied vocals at the Hochschule für Musik "Hanns Eisler" under Christa Niko, and then studied at the Hochschule für Musik Carl Maria von Weber with Christian Elßner and Hartmut Zabel. She has performed with notable orchestras such as the Dresden Staatskapelle, Dresdner Philharmonie, Berliner Philharmoniker, Concertgebouw Orchestra Amsterdam and Academy of St Martin in the Fields, and conductors such as Kent Nagano, Marek Janowski, Milan Horvat, Michel Plasson, Jörg-Peter Weigle and Philippe Herreweghe. Her singing is mainly centred on Baroque music, and is an interpreter of J. S. Bach. She has sung with ensembles such as the Akademie für Alte Musik Berlin, Freiburger Barockorchester, Musica Antiqua Köln, and Cantus Cölln.
