= Bridget Pitt =

- Born: Harare, Zimbabwe
- Occupation: Novelist
- Spouse: Mike Evans
- Children: Joanna Evans, Lara-May Evans
- Writing career
- Language: English
- Website: www.bridgetpitt.com

Bridget Pitt is a South African writer, environmental activist and art teacher who was born in Zimbabwe and lives in Cape Town.

In 1987 she received a British Council Scholarship to study media at the University of London.

Her first published writing was for grassroots newspapers, which was part of the anti-apartheid struggle during the 1980s. She also drew a cartoon strip for the Weekly Mail.

She wrote educational material for NGOs and textbooks, as well as poetry and fiction. She has published poetry in The Thinker magazine, short stories, and novels.

Her crime fiction novel The Unseen Leopard was shortlisted for the Commonwealth Writers' Prize in 2011, and for the 2012 Wole Soyinka Prize for Literature in Africa.

== List of titles ==
- 1998 Unbroken Wing
- 2010 The Unseen Leopard
- 2015 Notes from the Lost Property Department
- 2023 Eye Brother Horn
- 2023 The Silence Of Owls
