= Birgitte Esmark =

Norwegian zoologist (1841–1897)

- Birgithe Esmark
- Born: 13 October 1841; Brevik
- Died: 2 April 1897 (aged 55)
- Education: University of Kristiania

Birgitte Elise Esmark (13 October 1841 – 2 April 1897) was a Norwegian malacologist and is considered the first Norwegian female zoologist. She was the first woman to receive financial support for her scientific work from the Kongelige Frederiks Universitet in 1879, five years before it was open to women. Esmark's contributions as a malacologist advanced the knowledge of land and freshwater mollusks in Norway, both modern and fossil, with a particular focus on mollusks found in the Arctic regions.

== Personal life ==
Esmark was born in Brevik, a town located approximately 100 miles south of Oslo on the west side of the Oslo Fjord. Her father, Hans Morten Thrane Esmark (1801–1882), was a parish minister, mineralogist, and palaeontologist, and her mother Ulrike Benedicte Wiborg (1810–1898).

Esmark's family had close ties to the University of Kristiania (now Oslo). Her grandfather, Jens Esmark was a geologist, mining engineer, and professor of mining science at the university who had married the daughter of Danish zoologist Morten Thrane Brünnich. Her uncle, Laurits Martin Esmark, served as a professor of zoology and conservator at the zoological museum.

== Scientific work ==
Around the age of 27, she travelled to Madeira, then a sanatorium, for a two-year period to convalesce from tuberculosis. During her time on the island, she began studying molluscs. She collected molluscs and insects that she donated to the museum.

Upon returning to Norway, Esmark pursued her interest in molluscs, engaging in serious study despite being unable to enrol at the University of Kristiania, which was still closed to women at the time. She received a scholarship to collect in Nordland and Finnmark from the Royal Frederik's University where her uncle, Lauritis Esmark, served as a professor of zoology. In 1884 she published a dissertation on the land and freshwater molluscs of Norway.

Between 1880 and 1887, Esmark published six papers. Esmark distinguished herself through meticulous research on mollusks and their habitats. Notably, she made significant efforts to record the soil type for each of her mollusk findings, an uncommon practice during her time. This attention to detail demonstrated her recognition of the importance of soil type in determining species distribution which has since become best practice in the field. Her 1880 publication was also the first time in Norway that a woman had a scientific work published.

One of her specialised papers focused on the fossil molluscs of the Pisides group, commonly known as fingernail clams, collected in southern Norway. These freshwater molluscs have fragile shells and are often minute size, which poses challenges in their study. Esmark examined specimens primarily from the collections of Olaf Jensen, a curator at the Bergen Museum. However, she also conducted fieldwork herself, covering various formations such as limestone, gneiss, and schist, while collecting samples from the southern tip of Gubransdal to northern Osterdal. Her 1882 publication expanded the known species count of this group by six species and one variety, listing ten species and two varieties. In 1886, she also collaborated with Zacharias Hoyer, the conservator at the university's zoological museum, on a research paper.

== Social causes ==
Despite her achievements as a zoologist, Birgithe Esmark was best known to the general public for her philanthropic endeavors. During her childhood, Esmark often battled illness. At one point, she spent time at a health resort in Sandlefjord, where she met Mrs. Fearnley, an English woman who sparked her interest in Christian social work—a field in which Esmark became actively involved.

During the late 1800s and 1890s, societal discussions surrounding social reform and improving living conditions for the working class were prevalent. Esmark dedicated her efforts to the working-class districts of Kristiania. She collaborated with Countess Ida Wedel Jarlsberg in establishing a series of institutions to aid the poor. These initiatives included a school for underprivileged children in Piperviken, a dock area in Kristiania, and a mission to assist the impoverished through house visits and prayer meetings in nearby parts of the city.

In 1889, influenced by her English friend Mrs. Fearnley, Esmark founded the Norwegian section of the Young Women's Christian Association. Three years later, she established the Norwegian Women's Temperance League, assuming the role of secretary for both organisations. As the issue of prohibition gained national prominence in 1893, Esmark embarked on a countrywide lecture tour to promote temperance and morality, also recruiting members for the league.

== Death ==
Birgithe Esmark died of cancer in Kristiania on 2 April 1897, at the age of 55. In 1908, a memorial statue was erected at her grave in Vor Freslers cemetery, Kristiania, honoring her contributions to science and philanthropy.
