= Bridget Motha =

South African soccer player

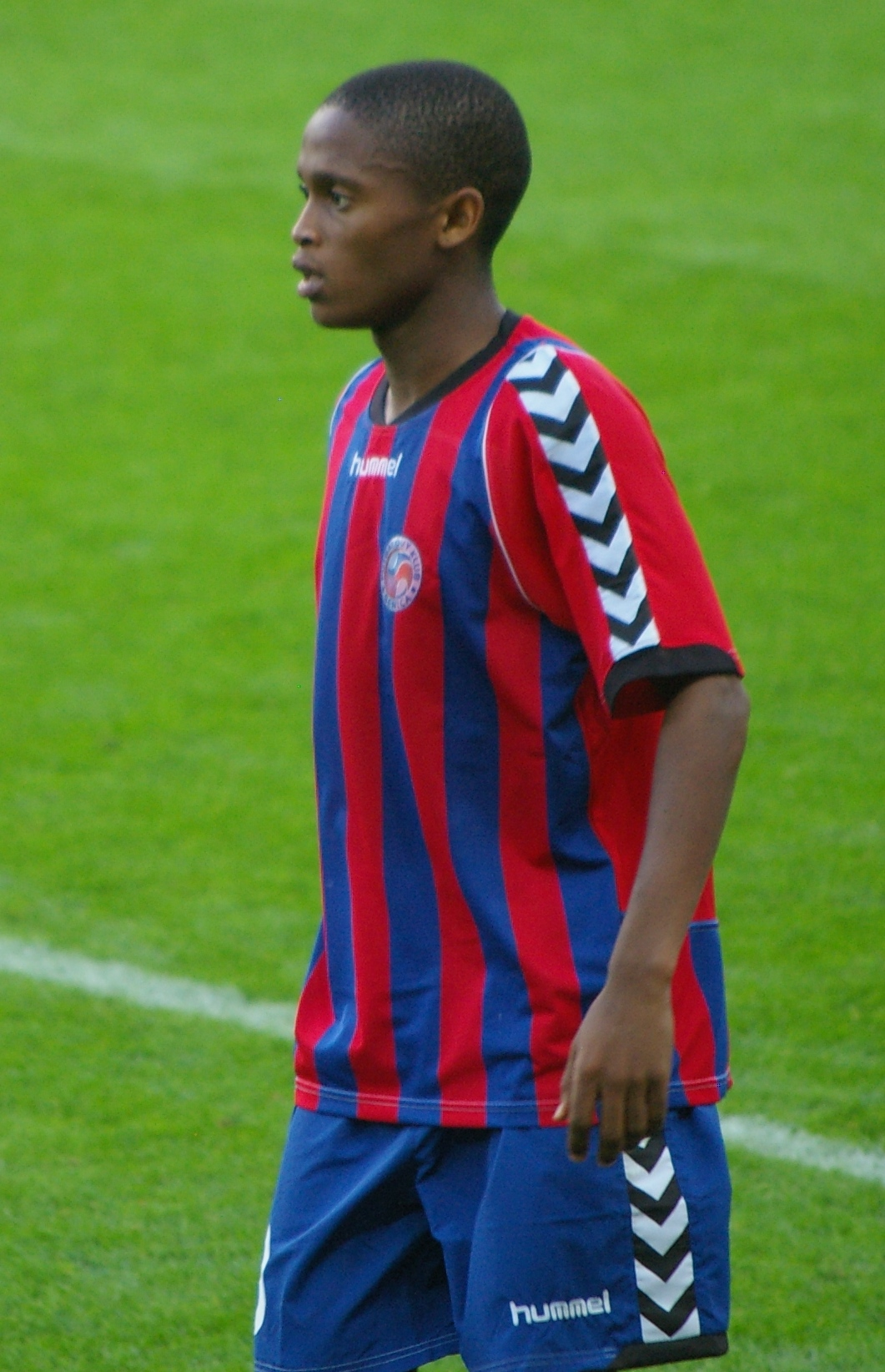
- Motha in 2011.

Personal information
- Full name: Bridget Motha
- Date of birth: 20 April 1986 (age 40)
- Place of birth: Bloemfontein, South Africa
- Height: 1.68 m (5 ft 6 in)
- Position: Midfielder

Youth career
- Jomo Cosmos
- Benoni Premier United
- Western Province United

Senior career*
Years	Team	Apps	(Gls)
2008–2009	Durban Stars		
2009–2010	University of Pretoria		
2010–2012	Cape Town		
2011–2012	→ Senica (loan)	3	(0)
2012–2014	Milano United	46	(2)
2014–2015	Cape Town All Stars		
2015–2016	Mthatha Bucks		
2016–2017	Real Kings		

International career^{‡}
	South Africa U23	3	(1)
- * Club domestic league appearances and goals as of 2 August 2014 ‡ National team caps and goals as of 10 July 2011

Bridget Motha (born 20 April 1986) is a South African soccer midfielder who currently plays for the Milano United. He previously played for Slovak club FK Senica.
