= Birgitta Steene =

Scandinavian studies scholar

Birgitta Steene (1928–2023) was a scholar at the University of Washington known for her work in Scandinavian Studies.

== Early life ==
Steene was born on October 7, 1928 in Sweden.

== Career ==
Steene was chair of the Department of Scandinavian Studies at the University of Washington from 1973 onwards. Steene was co-founder of the Film Studies Program at the University of Washington.

Steene published extensively on Scandinavian literature, drama, and film. She wrote her first reference guide on Ingmar Bergman in 1968, with a new edition released in 1974 and expanded versions released in 1987 and in 2005.

In 2005, Steene recorded an audio commentary for The Virgin Spring, and in 2008 provided a booklet essay for Miss Julie, both for The Criterion Collection.

Steene died on November 1, 2023.

== Selected publications ==
- Steene, Birgitta (1973). The greatest fire : a study of August Strindberg. OCLC 340955.
- Steene, Birgitta (1982). August Strindberg : an introduction to his major works. OCLC 9360222.
- Steene, Birgitta (1968). Ingmar Bergman. OCLC 289904.
- Steene, Birgitta (1987). Ingmar Bergman : a guide to references and resources. Boston, Mass. G.K. Hall. p. 342. ISBN 0816179611.

- Steene, Birgitta (1988), The image of the child in the Swedish cinema, OCLC 45702968

== Honors and awards ==
In 1982, Steene received an honorary doctorate from her alma mater, Uppsala University in Sweden.
