= Bridget Carragher =

American physicist

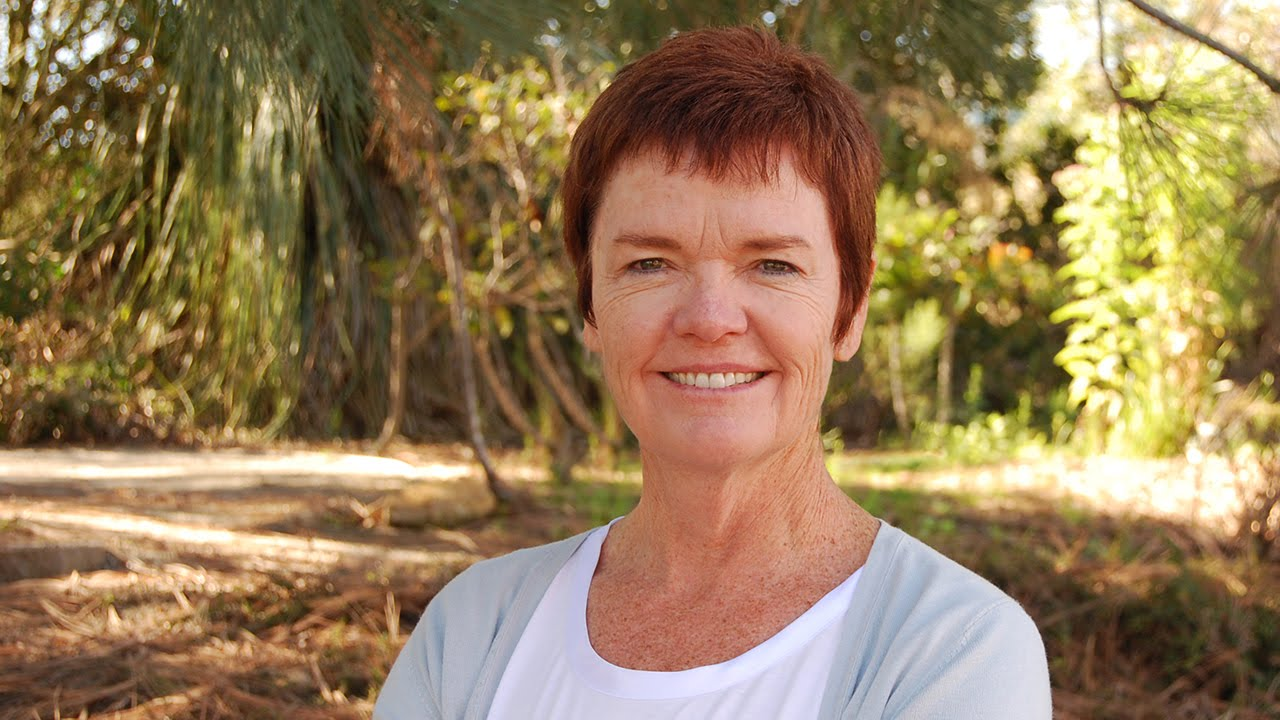
- Born: 17 June 1957 (age 69)
- Citizenship: USA
- Education: University of the Witwatersrand, Johannesburg, S. Africa (B.Sc. and M.Sc. in physics) Northwestern University, Evanston, Illinois (M.Sc. in physics) University of Chicago, Chicago, Illinois (Ph.D.)
- Scientific career
- Fields: Electron Microscopy, Structural Biology
- Thesis: The reconstruction of non-ideal helical particles and the restoration of blurred images in the analysis of sickle hemoglobin polymers (1987)

Bridget Olivia Carragher (born 17 June 1957) is a South African physicist specialized in electron microscopy.

Carragher is an adjunct professor at the Columbia University (New York City, NY) and the founder and Chief Operations Officer of NanoImaging Services, Inc. She was the co-director of the National Resources for Automated Molecular Microscopy (NRAMM) for about 20 years, is currently a co-director of the Simons Electron Microscopy Center at New York Structural Biology Center (New York City, NY) and the National Center for CryoEM Access and Training.

== Personal life ==
Carragher was born in South Africa. She lived in Ghana during her childhood and for one year in England. After earning her master's degree, she moved to the United States and has lived there since where she is a US citizen.

Carragher is married and has two children.

== Education ==
Carragher studied physics at the University of the Witwatersrand, South Africa, from 1975 to 1981. She spent a year at Northwestern University, Evanston, Illinois, and graduated with a MSc in physics. In 1987 she gained her PhD in physics from University of Chicago, Chicago, Illinois.

== Career ==
Carragher has spent much of her career in developing streamlined and automated electron microscopy (EM) methods aimed at improving both the quality of EM data and the accessibility of these techniques to the broader biological community.

After her Ph.D., she held several posts in industry and academia until moving to the Scripps Research Institute in 2001. Since 2002, she has served with Clint Potter as the director of the National Resource for Automated Molecular Microscopy (NRAMM), an NIH-funded national biotechnology research resource. The NRAMM specializes in developing and applying automated technologies for EM and providing training at all levels.

In 2007 Carragher co-founded NanoImaging Services, a company that provides microscopy services to the biopharmaceutical and biotechnology industries.

In 2015 Carragher and Clint moved their academic lab from The Scripps Research Institute to the New York Structural Biology Center, where they serve as co-directors of the Simons Electron Microscopy Center. In May 2018, they were awarded a U24 grant to start the National Center for CryoEM Access and Training (NCCAT).

In 2022 she was named a Founding Technical Director of the Chan Zuckerberg Institute for Advanced Biological Imaging.

Positions and Employment
Year	Position
1987 - 1988	Research Associate, U. Chicago
1988 - 1990	Senior Scientist, CEMAX Incorporated, Santa Clara, California
1990 - 1991	Assistant Research Neuroscientist, Dept. of Neuroscience, UCSD
1992 - 1998	Director, Optical Visualization Facility, Beckman Institute, UIUC
1994 - 2001	Adjunct Assistant Professor, Dept. of Cell and Structural Biology, UIUC
1996 - 1999	Senior Research Scientist, National Center for Supercomputing Applications, UIUC
1998 - 2001	Director, Imaging Technology Group, Beckman Institute, UIUC
2001 - 2012	Associate Professor, Dept. of Cell Biology, The Scripps Research Institute. La Jolla, CA
2003–present	Director, National Resource for Automated Molecular Microcopy (NRAMM)
2007–present	Founder and Chief Science Officer, NanoImaging Services, Inc.
2012 - 2014	Professor, Dept. of Integrative Structural and Computational Biology, The Scripps Research Institute. La Jolla, CA
2015–present	Director, Simons Electron Microscopy Center, New York Structural Biology Center, NY, NY
2015–present	Adjunct Professor, Columbia University, New York, NY
2018–present	Co-PI, National Center for CryoEM Access and Training
2022–present	Founding Technical Director, Chan Zuckerberg Institute for Advanced Biological Imaging

Other Experience and Professional Memberships
Year	Activity
1993–present	Editorial Board, Journal of Structural Biology
1993–present	Member of various NIH/NSF Study Sections
1993 - 2000	Scientific Advisory Committee, National Center for Macromolecular Imaging, Baylor College of Medicine
1993, 1995	Co-organizer, Workshop on Advanced Computing for Biological Imaging, UIUC/NCSA
1995	Co-organizer, A Hands-on Workshop on Practical Stereological Techniques, UIUC
1995–present	Member of Advisory Committee, HVEM Resource, Boulder, Co.
1996	Co-editor, Journal of Structural Biology Special Issue on “Software Resources for Image Processing and Visualization in Structural Biology”
1998–present	Member of Advisory Committee, BMIRR, Wadsworth Center, Albany, NY
1997, 1999	Vice-chair, chair, Gordon Conference on 3DEM of Macromolecules
2003	Co-organizer, Multidisciplinary Workshop on Automated Particle Selection
2003 - 2014	Co-organizer, Biennial Workshop In Molecular Microscopy
2003	Co-editor, Journal of Structural Biology, Special Issues on Automated Particle Selection and Analytical Methods
2003 - 2005	NIH BBCB Study Section
2005 - 2007	NIH MI Study Section
2005–present	Associate editor, Journal of Structural Biology
2011 - 2015	Scientific Advisory Committee, Transcontinental EM Initiative for Membrane Protein Structure
2012 - 2014	Advisory Board, National Canadian CryoEM Facility
2013 - 2015	External Advisory Committee, Theoretical and Computational Biophysics Group
2014–present	Chair, EMDB Committee for cryoEM map challenge
2015–present	Member, wwPDB Integrative/Hybrid Method (IHM) Task Force: Federation Subgroup
2015–present	Member, Diamond Scientific Advisory Committee
2015–present	Member, RCSB Protein Data Bank Advisory Committee
2015–present	Member, External Advisory Board, National Center for X-ray Tomography
2016–present	Editorial Board, Cell Chemical Biology
2017–present	Member, NCXT Advisory Committee
2017–present	Member, International Scientific Advisory Board, Max Planck Institute, Frankfurt
2017–present	External Advisory Board, UTSW multi-user cryoEM facility
2017	Honorary Fellow of the Royal Microscopy Society
2017–present	Editorial Board, Biophysical Journal
2018–present	External Advisory Board, Harvard multi-user cryoEM facility

== Contribution to Science ==
Throughout her career, Carragher has published 165 papers, received several research funding grants and owns five patents.

=== Patents ===
- Smith PE, Callahan MP, Daniel I, Potter CS, Carragher B, Suloway CJ, inventors; Robotic system for sequencing multiple specimens between a holding tray and microscope. 2005, US 2005/0107917 A1.
- Mulder A, Carragher B, Potter CS, inventors; Characterization of particulates using electron microscopy and image processing methods. 2011, Provisional. Filed 8/17/2011.
- Carragher B, Potter CS, Jain T, inventors; Preparation of specimen arrays on an EM grid. 2012, Provisional. Filed 1/17/2012.
- Carragher B, Potter CS, Jain T, inventors; Superhydrophilic specimen grids for electron microscopy. 2012, Provisional. Filed 1/17/2012.
- Carragher B, Potter CS, Jain T, Kahn P, Wiktor P, inventors; Apparatus and method for producing specimens for electron microscopy. 2012, Provisional. Filed 1/17/2012.

=== Contributions to the EM field ===
1. Suloway, C; Pulokas, J; Fellmann, D; Cheng, A; Guerra, F; Quispe, J; Stagg, S; Potter, CS; Carragher, B (2005). "Automated molecular microscopy: the new Leginon system". J Struct Biol. 151 (1): 41–60. doi:10.1016/j.jsb.2005.03.010. PMID 15890530.
2. Lander, GC; Stagg, SM; Voss, NR; Cheng, A; Fellmann, D; Pulokas, J; Yoshioka, C; Irving, C; Mulder, A; Lau, PW; Lyumkis, D; Potter, CS; Carragher, B (2009). "Appion: an integrated, database-driven pipeline to facilitate EM image processing". J Struct Biol. 166 (1): 95–102. doi:10.1016/j.jsb.2009.01.002. PMC 2775544. PMID 19263523.
3. Lyumkis, D; Julien, JP; de Val, N; Cupo, A; Potter, CS; Klasse, PJ; Burton, DR; Sanders, RW; Moore, JP; Carragher, B; Wilson, IA; Ward, AB (2013). "Cryo-EM structure of a fully glycosylated soluble cleaved HIV-1 envelope trimer". Science. 342 (6165): 1484–90. Bibcode:2013Sci...342.1484L. doi:10.1126/science.1245627. PMC 3954647. PMID 24179160.
4. Noble, AJ; Wei, H; Dandey, VP; Zhang, Z; Tan, YZ; Potter, CS; Carragher, B (2018). "Reducing effects of particle adsorption to the air-water interface in cryo-EM". Nat Methods. 15 (10): 793–795. doi:10.1038/s41592-018-0139-3. PMC 6168394. PMID 30250056.
5. Scapin, G; Dandey, VP; Zhang, Z; Prosise, W; Hruza, A; Kelly, T; Mayhood, T; Strickland, C; Potter, CS; Carragher, B (2018). "Structure of the insulin receptor-insulin complex by single-particle cryo-EM analysis". Nature. 556 (7699): 122–5. Bibcode:2018Natur.556..122S. doi:10.1038/nature26153. PMC 5886813. PMID 29512653.

=== Additional selected contributions to the EM field ===
==== CryoEM automation ====
Carragher was an early advocate for automated methods for electron microscopy. She developed software to analyze poorly ordered sickle cell hemoglobin fibers and went on to collaborate with Ron Milligan's group to develop a pipeline for helical processing (Phoelix). Carragher and Potter led the development of Leginon, a system for automated control and data acquisition from an electron microscope, and Appion, a pipeline for single particle data processing.

==== New technologies for TEM ====
Carragher and her team have developed a number of technologies for transmission electron microscopy (TEM). These include Spotiton, an inkjet dispense and vitrification system for cryo-TEM, robotic devices to load TEM specimens into the microscope, liquid handling robots for controlling sample vitrification and negative staining, and new substrates.

==== Contributions to structural biology ====
Carragher has co-authored several papers in this area.

Carragher's lab team includes a number of post-docs and graduate students . These researchers have contributed a number of papers to scientific journals.

==== Contributions to Methodology: ====
Carragher has worked to validate and improve methods in the field. In particular, she has worked on a particle picking workshop, the recent CTF challenge and a number of workshops organized by the EMDB to discuss standards and validation. She have also organized workshops, including the NRAMM biennial Advanced Methods Workshop.

== Honors ==
In 2019, Carragher and Philip E Batson were awarded the 2019 Microscopy Society of America Distinguished Scientist Award.

In 2022, Carragher was awarded The Biophysical Society Innovation Award and was elected to the American Academy of Arts and Sciences.
