= Gitta-Maria Sjöberg =

Swedish operatic soprano

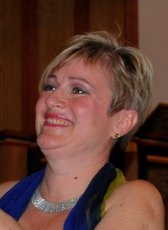
Gitta-Maria Sjöberg

Gitta-Maria Sjöberg (born 25 July 1957) is a Swedish operatic soprano who celebrated her 25th anniversary as a soloist with the Royal Danish Theatre in 2013. She has frequently performed outside Denmark, especially in Germany and Sweden as well as in North and South America.

== Biography ==
Born on 25 July 1957 in Trollhättan, southwestern Sweden, Sjöberg first sang in public when she was just four years old. Inspired by her mother, who had dreamt of being an actress, she studied at the Royal Academy of Music, Aarhus/Aalborg and at the Royal Danish Academy of Music in Copenhagen where she graduated in 1988.

She made her stage début while still studying appearing as Mimi in La Bohème in 1987. She has also starred in Puccini's Tosca and above all in Madama Butterfly, in Copenhagen, Düsseldorf and Stockholm. Other roles have included Carmen, Elisabeth in Don Carlos, Sieglinde in Der Ring des Nibelungen, Euridice in Orfeo ed Euridice and Brangäne in Tristan und Isolde. She is married to the Danish composer and music teacher Matti Borg.

Sjöberg has made several recordings including Danacord's "Verdi & Puccini Arias" in 2007.

== Awards ==
Sjöberg has received several awards including the Birgit Nilsson Scholarship (1988) and the Edith Brodersen honorary award. In 2004, she was honoured as a knight of the Order of the Dannebrog (first class).
