= Gitte (name) =

Gitte is a feminine given name which is mostly used in Denmark, but is also popular in Belgium. It is a reduced version of Birgitte. The name was particularly popular in the 1960s and 1970s. Notable people with the name include:

- Gitte Aaen (born 1981), Danish handball player
- Gitte Andersen (footballer) (born 1977), Danish football player
- Gitte Andersen (handballer) (born 1989), Danish handball player
- Gitte Dæhlin (1956–2012), Norwegian sculptor
- Gitte Haenen (born 1986), Belgian paralympic athlete
- Gitte Hænning (born 1946), Danish singer and film actress
- Gitte Hansen (born 1961), Danish football player
- Gitte Haslebo (born 1943), Danish scientist and author
- Gitte Karlshøj (born 1959), Danish athlete
- Gitte Krogh (born 1977), Danish football player
- Gitte Larsen, Danish curler
- Gitte Lillelund Bech (born 1969), Danish politician
- Gitte Lindstrøm (born 1975), Danish ballet dancer
- Gitte Madsen (born 1969), Danish handball player
- Gitte Moos Knudsen, Danish neurobiologist and neurologist
- Gitte Pedersen (born 1979), Danish football player
- Gitte Seeberg (born 1960), Danish politician and lawyer
- Gitte Spee (born 1950), Dutch illustrator
- Gitte Sunesen (born 1971), Danish handball player
