= 1219 Britta =

Main-belt asteroid

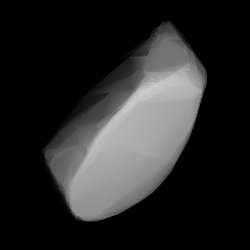
- Shape model of Britta from its lightcurve

Discovery
- Discovered by: M. F. Wolf
- Discovery site: Heidelberg Obs.
- Discovery date: 6 February 1932

Designations
- Named after: unknown
- Alternative designations: 1932 CJ · 1947 XG; 1975 FE · A904 SB; A915 BD
- Minor planet category: main-belt · (inner); Flora · background

Orbital characteristics
- Epoch 23 March 2018 (JD 2458200.5)
- Uncertainty parameter 0
- Observation arc: 113.51 yr (41,461 d)
- Aphelion: 2.4883 AU
- Perihelion: 1.9390 AU
- Semi-major axis: 2.2136 AU
- Eccentricity: 0.1241
- Orbital period (sidereal): 3.29 yr (1,203 d)
- Mean anomaly: 131.11°
- Mean motion: 0° 17^{m} 57.48^{s} / day
- Inclination: 4.4135°
- Longitude of ascending node: 42.543°
- Argument of perihelion: 23.720°

Physical characteristics
- Mean diameter: 9.86±0.34 km 11.43±0.9 km 11.76±0.30 km
- Synodic rotation period: 5.573±0.001 h 5.574±0.003 h 5.5750±0.0005 h 5.575±0.001 h 5.575 h 5.575 h 5.57556±0.00001 h 5.57557±0.00002 h
- Geometric albedo: 0.223±0.013; 0.2267±0.040; 0.2629 (derived); 0.346±0.041
- Spectral type: S (S3OS2); B–V = 0.913; U–B = 0.514
- Absolute magnitude (H): 11.7; 11.80; 11.94

1219 Britta, provisional designation 1932 CJ, is a stony background asteroid from the inner regions of the asteroid belt, approximately 11 kilometers (7 miles) in diameter. It was discovered on 6 February 1932, by German astronomer Max Wolf at the Heidelberg-Königstuhl State Observatory in southern Germany. The likely elongated S-type asteroid has a rotation period of 5.57 hours. Any reference of its name to a person is unknown.

== Orbit and classification ==
Britta is a non-family asteroid of the main belt's background population when applying the hierarchical clustering method to its proper orbital elements. Based on osculating Keplerian orbital elements, the asteroid has also been classified as a member of the Flora family (402), a giant asteroid family and the largest family of stony asteroids in the main-belt.

It orbits the Sun in the inner main-belt at a distance of 1.9–2.5 AU once every 3 years and 3 months (1,203 days; semi-major axis of 2.21 AU). Its orbit has an eccentricity of 0.12 and an inclination of 4° with respect to the ecliptic.

The asteroid was first observed as A904 SB at Heidelberg Observatory in September 1904. The body's observation arc begins with its official discovery observation at Heidelberg in February 1932.

== Naming ==
This minor planet is named after a common German female name. Any reference of this name to a person or occurrence is unknown.

=== Unknown meaning ===
Among the many thousands of named minor planets, Britta is one of 120 asteroids, for which no official naming citation has been published. All of these low-numbered asteroids have numbers between 164 Eva and 1514 Ricouxa and were discovered between 1876 and the 1930s, predominantly by astronomers Auguste Charlois, Johann Palisa, Max Wolf and Karl Reinmuth.

== Physical characteristics ==
Britta has been characterized as a stony S-type asteroid in both the Tholen- and SMASS-like taxonomy of the Small Solar System Objects Spectroscopic Survey (S3OS2).

=== Rotation period ===
Several rotational lightcurves (Note: Lightcurve plot of (1219) Britta by R. D. Stephens (2014): rotation period 5.573±0.001 hours. 474 data points. Quality Code of 3. Summary figures at the LCDB and Center for Solar System Studies – CS3 Lightcurves Page) of Britta have been obtained from photometric observations since the 1980s. The consolidated lightcurve analysis results give a rotation period of 5.575 hours with a brightness amplitude between 0.48 and 0.75 magnitude, indicative of an elongated shape (U=3).

=== Spin axis ===
Modeled photometric data from the Lowell Photometric Database (LPD) and the robotic BlueEye600 Observatory, gave a concurring period of 5.57556 and 5.57557 hours, respectively. Both studies determined two spin axes of (72.0°, −66.0°) and (241.0°, −66.0°), as well as (61.0°, −2.0°) and (223.0°, −68.0°) in ecliptic coordinates (λ, β).

=== Diameter and albedo ===
According to the surveys carried out by the Infrared Astronomical Satellite IRAS, the Japanese Akari satellite and the NEOWISE mission of NASA's Wide-field Infrared Survey Explorer, Britta measures between 9.860 and 11.76 kilometers in diameter and its surface has an albedo between 0.223 and 0.346. The Collaborative Asteroid Lightcurve Link derives an albedo of 0.2629 and a diameter of 11.31 kilometers based on an absolute magnitude of 11.8.
