= Bridget Flannery =

Irish painter

- Born: 1959 (age 66–67)
- Died: 15/4/2024; Ireland
- Education: Crawford College of Art, and Design Cork
- Known for: Painting
- Spouse: Bob Frazier
- Children: Ian Frazier. HUGH Frazier.Isobel Frazier
- Parents: Jack Flannery (father); chrissie cashman (mother)

Bridget Flannery (born 1959) is an Irish painter working in abstract painting. Mark Ewart says: "She is not a landscape painter in the strictest sense of the word," but both he and fellow critic Aidan Dunne say that her work is influenced by landscapes or seascapes. She studied at the Crawford College of Art, and Design Cork. She has exhibited across Ireland and internationally. Her work was included in the exhibition "Cork Art Now '85" at the Crawford Municipal Art Gallery and then traveled to the Heineken Gallery in Amsterdam.

In October 2022, the Lavit Gallery in Cork, Ireland held a solo exhibit, "Undersong," of Flannery's work.
