= Brigita Ozolins =

Australian artist

- Education: Monash University; University of Tasmania
- Known for: Installation Art
- Website: www.brigitaozolins.com.au

Brigita Ozolins is an Australian installation artist and senior lecturer at the University of Tasmania. She won the Qantas Contemporary Art Award in 2008 and her work has been commissioned for the Museum of Old and New Art and the Tasmanian Museum and Art Gallery.

== Art career ==
In 1994, Ozolins suffered a head injury which motivated her to enroll at the University of Tasmania art school. She graduated in 1999 and won the University of Tasmania's University Medal.

In 2008, Ozolins won the US$30,000 Qantas Contemporary Art Award which she used to travel, retracing her mother's journey from Latvia.

=== Notable art installations ===
Ozolins was commissioned to make the installation Kryptos by David Walsh for the Museum of Old and New Art in 2005. The Tasmanian Museum and Art Gallery featured Ozolins’ 2011 installation The Reading Room which explored 'how the written and spoken word affects our understanding of the world, others and ourselves'.

== Personal life ==
Ozolins lives with her partner Gerard Willems.
