= Maura and Britta =

Christian martyr of the Roman era

Maura and Britta were two 4th-century Christian martyrs. They are venerated as saints, but their story is lost. According to Gregory of Tours, their relics were discovered by his predecessor as Bishop of Tours, Eufronius, in the 6th century. Their feast day is 15 January.
