= Birgitte Bak-Jensen =

Danish professor

- Citizenship: Denmark
- Education: MSc in Engineering and PhD from Aalborg University
- Occupations: professor and researcher
- Employer: Aalborg University
- Organization: CIGRE
- Awards: The CIGRE Technical Council Award

Birgitte Bak-Jensen is a Danish professor and researcher at the Department of Energy Technology at Aalborg University. Her research is aimed at intelligent energy systems and active electrical grids.

== Education ==
Birgitte Bak-Jensen completed her master's degree in System Engineering (MSc.Eng.) at Aalborg University in 1986. In 1992, she received her PhD for her dissertation on the modeling of high voltage components, also from Aalborg University.

== Career ==
Since 1988, Birgitte Bak-Jensen has been employed at Aalborg University. She has held positions as a research fellow, assistant professor, lecturer, and has later on become a full-time professor. In her research, she has mainly been occupied within the field of electric power distribution in electrical grids. In her first years as a researcher, Bak-Jensen primarily focused on the stability and quality of electricity.

In recent years, Bak-Jensen has been occupied with the future electrical grids and their integration of Sustainable energy sources and the new load from electrical cars, heat pumps, and battery storages. Furthermore, she is contributing to the field in numerous national and international research projects, of which she is working as the project manager on some of these.

Bak-Jensen is also a core-research scientist at Center for Data-Intensive Cyber-Physical Systems (DiCyPS). At the research center, which is funded by Innovation Fund Denmark, the primary objective is working "[…] on utilizing software and data from the IT management of complex physical systems for the development of smarter and more user-friendly solutions for society and individuals.".

In addition, Bak-Jensen is the project manager of the project ‘Determination of Automation Demands for Improved Controllability and Observability in Distribution Networks’ (DECODE), which develops innovative methods and techniques for accurately estimating the performance of distribution grids.

== Achievements ==
In 2018, Birgitte Bak-Jensen received "The CIGRE Technical Council Award" for her active participation in the activities of the technical work of the Study Committees at the CIGRE Technical Council.

== Publications ==
Bak-Jensen has 138+ published works, which has been cited in 2829+ different documents and 7168+ instances.
