= Bridgett Kern =

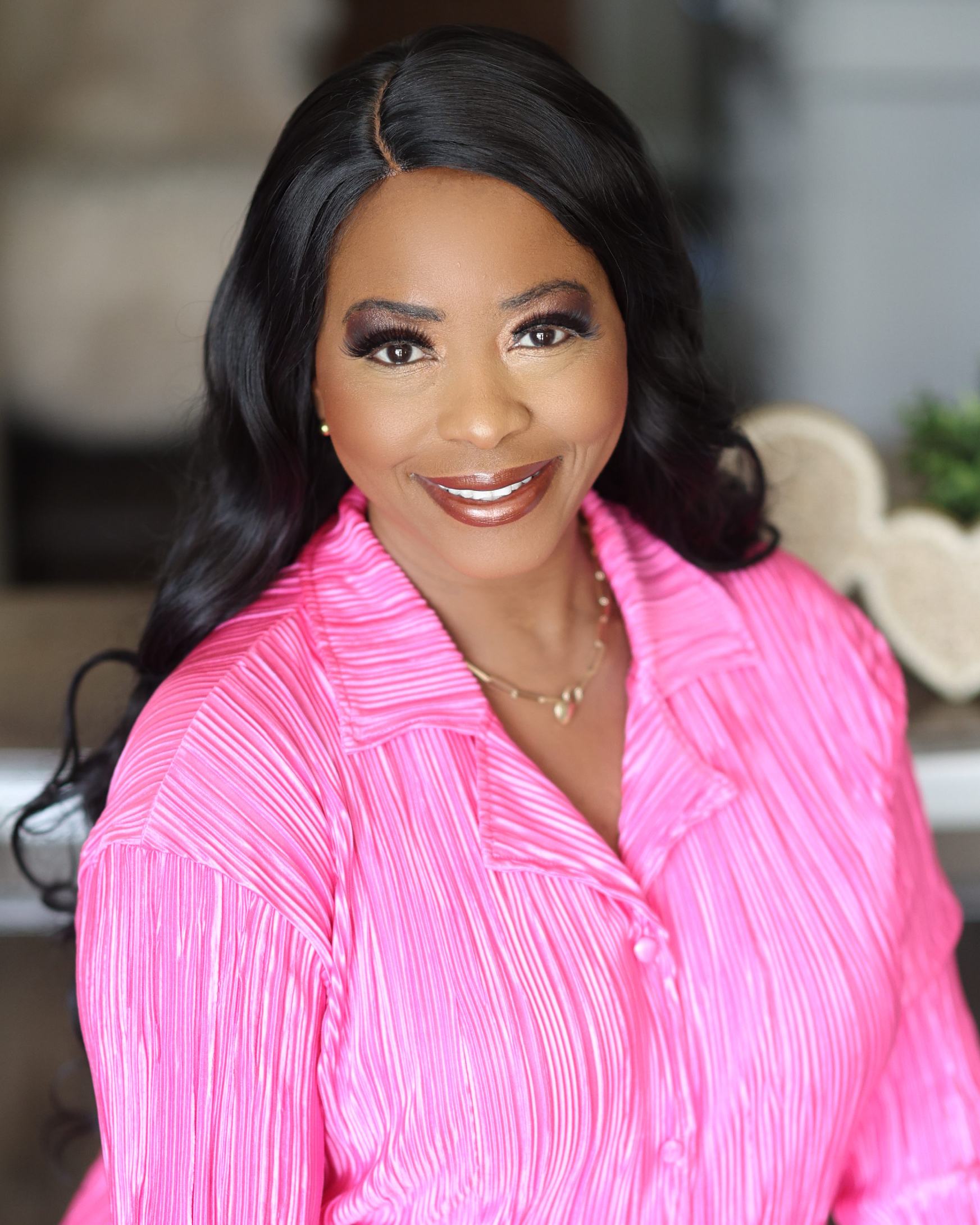

Background information
- Birth name: Bridgette Karen Overstreet
- Also known as: Bridgett Kern
- Born: September 7, 1969 (age 55); Phoenix, Arizona
- Genres: Worship, urban contemporary gospel, traditional black gospel
- Occupation(s): Singer, songwriter
- Instrument(s): Vocals, singer-songwriter
- Years active: 2002–present
- Labels: Platinum Image Music Group, Dream Label Group
- Website: bridgettkern.com

Bridgette Karen "Bridgett" Kern (born September 7, 1969), is an American worship musician and urban contemporary gospel recording artist. She started her music career, in 2002, and has released two studio album's.

== Early and personal life ==
Kern was born Bridgette Karen Overstreet, on September 7, 1969, in Phoenix, Arizona, where she grew up singing in the Phoenix Mass Choir founded by Eddie James. She is married to a pastor, Dr. Joseph Kern, where they are both pastors of Radiant Life Church, and they have four children, Cierra, Caleb, Gabrielle, and Brandon.

== Music career ==
Her music recording career started in 2002, with the studio album, Broken Spirit. The subsequent studio album, No One Greater, was released in 2015, from Dream Worship, a division of Dream Records.

== Discography ==
Studio albums

- Broken Spirit (2002)
- No One Greater (2015, Dream Worship)
