= Bridget Martyn =

British encyclopedist (1935–2020)

- Born: 4 August 1935; Cairo, Egypt
- Died: 17 April 2020 (aged 84); Oxford, England
- Other name: Bridget Hadaway
- Children: Nicholas, Sophie, and Harry Hadaway

Bridget Martyn (August 4, 1935 – 2020) was an encyclopedist, the senior editorial manager of Oxford University Press's Oxford Illustrated Encyclopaedia in 1993 and editor-in-chief of Microsoft Encarta from 1993 through 1995.

She authored The Bible for Children with Jean Atcheson, first published in 1973 which had a foreword by the Archbishop of Canterbury. In 1978 she published Fairy Tales which included retellings of classic fairy tales.

Martyn was born in Cairo, Egypt. She went to Edinburgh University and graduated with a degree in French and German. She married Robert Hadaway in 1967. They raised three children and later divorced.
