= Gitte Tamar =

American horror fiction novelist

- Born: Bridget Wilmes; Oregon, USA
- Education: Southern New Hampshire University; MA Law (University of Southern California)
- Occupations: Author, actress
- Website: www.brigittetamar.com

Gitte Tamar, also known as Brigitte Tamar (born Bridget Wilmes), is an American horror fiction novelist.

== Early life and education ==
Tamar was born in Oregon, US. After graduating from Jesuit High School in Portland, she attended Texas Christian University in Fort Worth, Texas, until 2015, when she won the title of Miss Oregon USA.

After competing in the Miss USA televised program, she attended Southern New Hampshire University, where she finished her degree in business. She then received her MA in Studies of Law from the University of Southern California with graduate certificates in business law, entertainment law, and industries.

== Career ==
As an author, Tamar published her first novel titled "Shadows That Speak," a part of a gothic horror trilogy, in 2021. She published her second novel in 2022, titled "Run, Run, Baby," a psychological thriller. Later in the same year, she published "Ten-Cent Man," then "A Shadow," a gothic horror novel, and "Ghoulish Tales for the Brave," a horror-based poetry book. She also published the second part of her gothic horror trilogy, "Shadows That Tempt," in April and the final part, "Shadows That Play," in September 2022.

She published the novel "Squeal," a horror thriller, in December 2022.

In July 2023, Tamar published "Hel," which was listed by Mystery Tribune as one of July's best crime and mystery books to watch for. It was also ranked at the No. 1 position on Amazon in the Classic Horror category.

Tamar's work has been reviewed by many critics and production companies, including BroadwayWorld. Her work also revolves around social issues, including peer pressure, homelessness, addiction, childhood trauma, and abuse.

== Film and television ==
In 2015, Tamar was featured as herself (Miss Oregon) in the Miss USA televised program.

In 2022, her novel "Wastoid" about addiction was adapted into a short film and shown in the festival circuit, where she had her directorial debut. The film was a selection at the Los Angeles Shorts International Festival and received an Award of Merit from One-Reeler short film competition. Tamar has also worked in a few other films and TV shows.
