= Bridgit =

Bridgit is a name with several traditional variant spellings. It may refer to:

- Bridgit Fitzgerald (died 1898), Canadian philanthropist
- Bridgit Mendler (born 1992), an American actress and singer
- Bridgit (24 character), a fictional mercenary in the television drama 24
- Saint Bridgit (c. 451– c. 525), Irish Christian nun
- The Celtic goddess Brigid

== See also ==
- Bridget (given name)
