= Bridget R. Cooks =

American art historian

Bridget R. Cooks is an American scholar, writer, curator, and academic. She is a professor who holds a joint appointment in the Department of African American Studies and the Department of Art History at the University of California, Irvine.

== Education ==
Cooks holds a PhD in Visual and Cultural Studies from the Department of Art History at University of Rochester. Douglas Crimp advised her dissertation, for which she received a Henry Luce Dissertation Fellowship in American Art. Prior to UCI, she taught in the Department of Art and Art History and the Program of Ethnic Studies at Santa Clara University.

== Career ==
Cooks' research interests center on African American art history, Black visual culture, museology, and film criticism, and employ a feminist, postcolonial, and critical race theory lens. Cooks has published more than forty articles, appearing in publications such as Afterall, Afterimage, American Studies, Aperture, American Quarterly, Cultural Critique, and Nka: Journal of Contemporary African Art. She is the author of the book Exhibiting Blackness: African Americans and the American Art Museum (University of Massachusetts, 2011), which was awarded the inaugural James A. Porter & David C. Driskell Book Award in African American Art History in 2013. Other book projects include co-editing the volume Historical Perspective of African Americans and a monograph on the work of Richard Mayhew, as well as forthcoming books on mannequins in museums, popular art of the civil rights movement, and a study of Norman Rockwell's civil rights era paintings.

Cooks has a long history of working in museums. She was an intern at the National Museum of Women in the Arts, Washington D.C., Oakland Museum of California, and the National African American Museum Project which later became the National Museum of African American History and Culture. She has also worked as a museum educator for the National Gallery of Art, Washington D.C. and the Los Angeles County Museum of Art. Her curatorial work in museums includes curating exhibitions including "The Art of Richard Mayhew" at the Museum of the African Diaspora, San Francisco, "Grafton Tyler Brown: Exploring California" at the Pasadena Museum of California Art, and "Ernie Barnes: A Retrospective" at the California African American Museum.
