= Bridgette =

- Gender: Female

Origin
- Origin: Irish
- Meaning: "Strong willed"

Other names
- Related names: Bridget, Birgit

Bridgette is a feminine given name. It is a variant of Bridget. Notable people with the name include:

- Bridgette Allen, New Zealand singer
- Bridgette Andersen (1975–1997), American actress and model
- Bridgette Andrzejewski (born 1997), American soccer player
- Bridgette Armstrong (born 1992), New Zealand soccer player
- Bridgette Barry (1957–2021), American biochemist and biophysicist
- Bridgette Caquatto (born 1994), American artistic gymnast
- Bridgette Gordon (born 1967), American basketball player and coach
- Bridgette Gusterson (born 1973), Australian water polo player
- Bridgette Jordan (1989–2019), American woman with primordial dwarfism
- Bridgette Meinhold, American artist
- Bridgette Radebe (born 1960), South African businesswoman
- Bridgette Shannon, American chemist
- Bridgette Starr (born 1975), Australian soccer player
- Bridgette Tlhomelang (born 1975), South African politician
- Bridgette Wilson (born 1973), American retired actress, model, and beauty queen
- Bridgette Wimberly (1956–2022), American librettist and playwright

== Fictional characters ==
- Bridgette Summers, character from the Total Drama series
- Bridgette DuBois, character on Medium
- Bridgette Hashima, character on Close Enough

== See also ==
- Bridgette (game), a two-player variant of contract bridge.
