= Birgit Collin-Langen =

German politician (1956–2026)

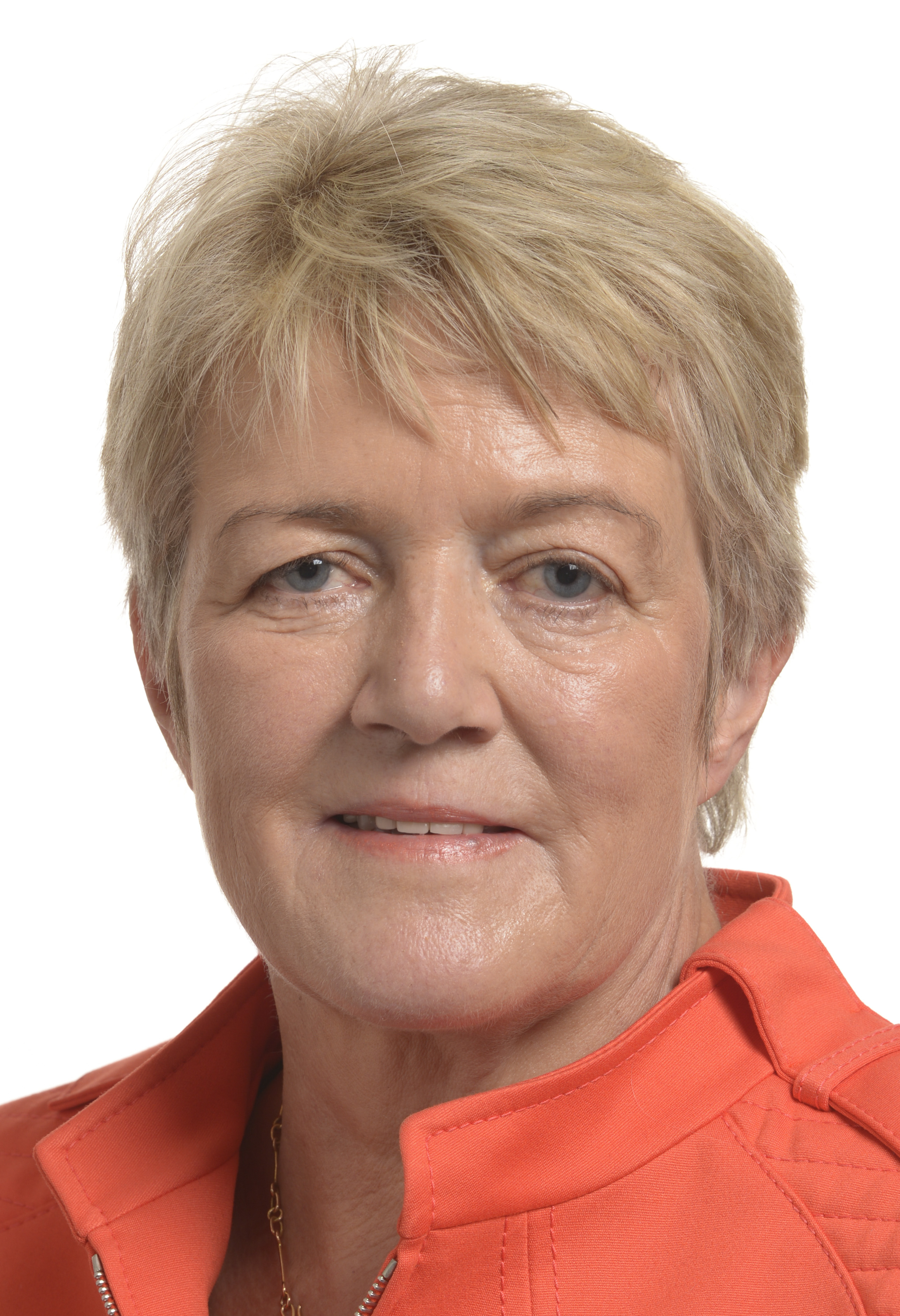

Member of the European Parliament
- In office 17 March 2012 – 1 July 2019
- Constituency: Germany

Personal details
- Born: 4 September 1956 Trier, Rhineland-Palatinate, West Germany
- Died: 1 April 2026 (aged 69) Germany
- Party: German; Christian Democratic Union; EU; European People's Party
- Website: www.collin-langen.eu

Birgit Collin-Langen (4 September 1956 – 1 April 2026) was a German politician who served as Member of the European Parliament (MEP) from 2012 until 2019. She was a member of the Christian Democratic Union, part of the European People's Party.

== Life and career ==
Between 1993 and 1996, Collin-Langen headed the department for legal affairs and human resources at the Investment and Economic Development Bank of Rhineland-Palatinate (ISB).

Collin-Langen served as the mayor of Bingen am Rhein from 1996 to 2012. In this capacity, she also served as vice-president of the Congress of the Council of Europe. Ahead of the 2011 state elections, she was part of Julia Klöckner's campaign team and served as shadow minister of justice and internal affairs.

In March 2012, Collin-Langen took her seat in the European Parliament for Rhineland-Palatinate in place of Kurt Lechner, who had resigned his seat due to age. Between 2012 and 2014, she served on the Committee on the Internal Market and Consumer Protection. From 2014, she was a member of the Committee on the Environment, Public Health and Food Safety. In 2015, she served as her parliamentary group's rapporteur on the Package Travel Directive (PTD).

In addition to her committee assignment, Collin-Langen was a member of the Parliament's delegation to the EU-Armenia and EU-Azerbaijan Parliamentary Cooperation Committees and the EU-Georgia Parliamentary Association Committee.

Within her party, Collin-Langen was a member of the CDU leadership in Rhineland-Palatinate under chairwoman Julia Klöckner. From 2001, she also served as chairwoman of the Frauenunion in Rhineland-Palatinate, the women's group of the CDU.

In August 2018, Collin-Langen announced that she would not stand in the 2019 European elections but instead resign from active politics by the end of the parliamentary term.

Collin-Langen died on 1 April 2026, at the age of 69.

== Other activities ==
- University of Applied Sciences Bingen, Member of the Board of Trustees
- German Association of Towns and Municipalities (DStGB), Member of the Presidium

== Controversy ==
In 2013, several members of the European Parliament's India Working Group filed a complaint after Collin-Langen. Together with MEPs Lena Kolarska-Bobińska and Kinga Gál they were alleged to have used a 50-seat bus to go shopping during an official delegation trip to Kolkata.

On 18 June 2015, Collin-Langen resigned from a secondary employment as a member of an advisory committee for the energy company RWE after criticism from LobbyControl on the publication day of a study that had been published by Lobby Control in collaboration with Corporate Europe Observatory and Friends of the Earth Europe. Criticism aimed at her advocating for RWE-friendly positions in the EPCEPHFS.
