= Bridget Hutter =

British sociologist

Bridget M. Hutter was a British sociologist.

Hutter attended the University of London, where she studied sociology, and later earned a doctorate in the subject from the University of Oxford. She began teaching at Oxford and later moved to the London School of Economics, serving as director of the ESRC Centre for Analysis of Risk and Regulation from 2000 to 2010. Hutter was a fellow of the Academy of Social Sciences and the Royal Society of Arts.

Hutter was named chief editor of the British Journal of Sociology in 2003. That same year, the journal began appearing within the digital library JSTOR. Under her editorship in 2004, the publication switched publishers, from Routledge to Wiley-Blackwell. Colin Mills succeeded Hutter as editor-in-chief in 2007, and she remained general editor of the journal through 2008.

Professor Hutter died on 10th April 2023.
