= Leadership (journal) =

- Discipline: Management studies
- Language: English
- Edited by: Dennis Tourish

Publication details
- History: 2005-present
- Publisher: SAGE Publications
- Frequency: Quarterly
- Impact factor: 3.4 (2022)

Standard abbreviations
- ISO 4: Leadership

Indexing
- ISSN: 1742-7150 (print); 1742-7169 (web)
- LCCN: 2005234209
- OCLC no.: 612913436

Links
- Journal homepage; Online access; Online archive

Leadership is a quarterly peer-reviewed academic journal that covers the field of management studies. The founding editors-in-chief were David Collinson and Keith Grint. The current editor of the journal is Dennis Tourish (University of Sussex). The journal was established in 2005 and is published by SAGE Publications.

== Abstracting and indexing ==
The journal is abstracted and indexed in Scopus and the Social Sciences Citation Index. According to the Journal Citation Reports, its 2023 impact factor is 3.4, ranking it 153rd out of 227 journals in the category "Management".
