= Birgit Püve =

Estonian photographer (born 1978)

- Born: 7 November 1978 (age 47); Elva, Tartu County, then part of Estonian SSR, Soviet Union
- Occupation: Photographer
- Known for: By The Lake, Estonian Documents

Birgit Püve (born 7 November 1978) is an Estonian photographer. She lives and works in Tallinn.

== Life and work ==
Birgit Püve started as a writing journalist for the Estonian weekly newspaper Eesti Ekspress. She quickly became a successful writer, winning several reputable awards. Yet, her love for photography led her to replace words with images. Besides her personal projects, she is a freelance photographer and photo editor.

Püve concentrates mainly on portrait photography and the presentation of human nature. With her widely acclaimed series By The Lake, she portrays the silent and dignified world of the Russian Old Believers living in the culturally unique part of Estonia on the shores of Lake Peipus, the biggest transboundary lake in Europe, which now separates two different worlds - European Union and Russian Federation. By The Lake consists of poetic diptychs of people and their private environments.

She is currently working on her next project, Estonian Documents. As a native Estonian, she explores Estonian faces intending to portray the nation as a whole. Through the portraits of known and unknown Estonians, she aims to treasure the psychological state of one Post-Soviet country in the 21st century.

Birgit Püve's work has been shown in exhibitions in Estonia, Latvia, Russia, France, UK, United States, Canada, Austria, Germany, and Poland.

== Recognition ==
Photo District News (PDN) Photo Annual 2011, USA. Winner in the category Personal with the series By The Lake.

Spectrum Emerging Talent 2012 of The Sunday Times Magazine, UK. With the ongoing series Estonian Documents.

First Prize in the Portrait category of the Estonian Press Photo 2012 contest with the series of staged portraits called Estonian Future Stars 2013 for the special edition of the cultural supplement of Eesti Ekspress. First Prize in the Portrait category of the Estonian Press Photo 2013 contest with the series of staged portraits of Estonian twins and triplets for the book project Double Matters (Elada mitmuses) by Hea Lugu Publishers.

Third Prize at the Taylor Wessing Photographic Portrait Prize 2014, organized by The National Portrait Gallery in London.

== Awards ==
Exposure Awards 2014, Finalist

== Memberships ==
Estonian Union of Photography Artists

Estonian Association of Press Photographers

== Books ==
Elada mitmuses / Double Matters, by Birgit Püve, ISBN 978-9949-538-05-8, Publisher: Hea Lugu, 128 pages. In Estonian with English summary. 2013.

== Collections ==
Püve's works are held in the Estonian Theatre and Music Museum collection and private collections in Estonia, Finland, Germany, UK, United States.

== Exhibitions ==
2015 "Double Matters," St. John's Church, Tartu, Estonia
2015 "Estonian Documents," Deutsche Journalisten-Verband Berlin, Berlin, Germany
2015 "Estonian Documents" Interphoto Festival, European Art Centre, Białystok, Poland
2016 "Estonian Documents," "By the Lake," Gallery Sztuka Wyboru, Gdańsk, Poland
2016 "Estonian Documents," 12 Star Gallery, Europe House, London, UK
2017 "Islanders", Kihnu museum, Kihnu island, Estonia
2017 "Sanctuary/Varjupaik" Tallinn City Gallery, Tallinn, Estonia
2017-2020 "Get ready! The Face of the University or 100 Teaching Staff Members of the University" travelling exhibition in the University of Tartu's academic buildings, Estonia
