= RCR Wireless News =

- Available in: English
- Founded: 1982
- Headquarters: Austin, Texas, United States
- Website: https://www.rcrwireless.com/

RCR Wireless News is a digital Wireless telecommunications industry trade publication. The core focus of the publisher are its news website, daily newsletters and editorial content, including reports and webinars. Alongside this, the organization also hosts digital and in-person industry events.

== History and profile ==
RCR Wireless was started in 1982. RCR Wireless News’ editorial team was led by Tracy Ford. The headquarters was in Golden, Colorado. On March 3, 2009, the magazine was shut down by Crain Communications.

The publication was sold to Arden Media Company, and relaunched as an online publication in September 2009 with the same editorial team. Its headquarters is in Austin, Texas.
