= Gitta Gyenes =

Hungarian painter (1888–1960)

- Born: Gitta Gyenes; 1887; Budapest, Austria-Hungary
- Died: 1960 (aged 72–73); Budapest, Hungary
- Spouse: Jenő Wallesz

Gyenes Gitta, born Gottlieb Margit (Budapest, March 24, 1887 – Budapest, September 25, 1960) was a Hungarian painter, graphic artist. Known for early innovations in Hungarian porcelain painting, she has one painting ("Parkban") on display in the Hungarian National Gallery. She is the sister of architect Lajos Gyenes. Her creations were featured in many contemporary exhibitions, from porcelain painting to design to painting. Her best-known works are the art deco graphics and paintings created in the twenties and thirties, several of which are owned by the Hungarian National Gallery. The creator of Gyenes Literary Salon.

== Biography ==
=== Her youth, her studies ===
Gottlieb Ferenc is an engineer from Debrecen and the daughter of Lujza Bettelheim. She began her art studies in Budapest with Bertalan Karlovszky, then continued her education in Nagybánya, Vienna and Rome. She also presented her works at the Könyves Kálmán Salon, the Art Gallery and the National Salon. On September 1, 1907, in Józsefváros, Budapest, she married journalist Jenő (Jakab) Wallesz.

In 1914-15, she won a silver medal with her work at the world art exhibition held in San Francisco on the occasion of the opening of the Panama Canal.

According to her daughter's recollections, in the summer of 1924, while walking with a friend in Városliget, her mother got into a conversation with two young men, one of whom was 19-year-old Attila József. After 5 minutes, the poet confessed his love to the painter, who was 18 years older than him, saying "she is his seventh love". After that, he visited the Gyenes family many times, during which she bantered with him as well as developed a playful friendship with the poet, without any real love in return. The painter also painted a portrait of the poet, and Attila József wrote several poems. In the following years, József Attila was often a guest at the Gittas - who was a mature beauty and an attractive artist at the time -, among other things, in the framework of the Gyenes Literary Salon organized in their apartment, where he, Kosztolányi, Karinthy, Kassák, Faludy, Tersánszky and others read their writings.

=== The Gyenes Literary Salon ===
In the 1920s and 1930s, their apartment under Gyarmat utca 2 became known as the Gyenes Literary Salon as an art and literary salon, which attracted young writers who read their new writings to each other and lived a lively social life. The fact that Gitta Gyenes was not only educated, but also an attractive and beautiful woman may have played a role in this, and her daughter, the enchantingly beautiful Luca Wallesz, also became an active member of the family literary salon from her teenage years. The husband, Jenő Wallesz, "couldn't stand" the young writers, so the salon usually started after 4 p.m., when the husband left home to run errands. Attila József, Dezső Kosztolányi, Frigyes Karinthy, György Faludy, Lajos Kassák and Jenő Józsi Tersánszky were the central figures of the salon's reading evenings. The most frequent guest was Attila József, for about four years he was an almost daily guest at the Gyenes' apartment in Zugló. József Attila wrote for Gitta in 1924, during their active relationship, 'It was summer' and 'Why You Left Me If You Want Me', and in 1936 he wrote the poem 'Az a szép, régi asszony' as a memorial.

Gyenes also painted a portrait of Attila József during this period. The Salon continued later when the Gyenes family moved to their apartment on Amerikai út.

In 1928, she became a member of KÚT. She also worked on porcelain painting.

Her death was caused by an organic heart problem, heart failure at the age of 73. Her grave is located in the Israeli cemetery on Kozma Street.
