= Bridget Mutuma =

Kenyan nanotechnologist

- Education: Ph.D, University of the Witwatersrand
- Alma mater: Kangwon National University, Kenyatta University
- Scientific career
- Institutions: Nairobi University
- Website: spas.kyu.ac.ke/faculty?start=13

Bridget K. Mutuma is a researcher in chemistry and material sciences at Nairobi University in Kenya. She focuses on developing nanomaterials associated with sensors. She is a Fellow of the African Academy of Sciences.
