= Bridget Connolly =

Irish nationalist and republican

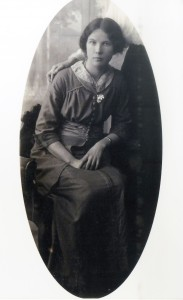
- Born: 23 May 1890; Friarstown, County Carlow, Ireland
- Died: 15 November 1981 (aged 91)
- Other names: Brid, Brede

Bridget Connolly (23 May 1890 – 15 November 1981) was an Irish nationalist and republican, active during the Easter Rising of 1916 and believed to be the only person from County Carlow to be in the General Post Office, Dublin, during the Easter Rising. She also served during both the War of Independence and the Irish Civil War.

== Biography ==
Bridget Connolly was born 23 May 1890 in Friarstown near Killerig, County Carlow. Her parents were Peter Connolly, a labourer, and Elizabeth Gaynor. The Connolly's left Friarstown, possibly after they were evicted, and by 1911 were living in Artane, Dublin. She attended school at St. Vincent's Convent School, Dublin, going to qualify as a school teacher. She then joined Cumann na mBan, an Irish republican women's paramilitary organisation.

In advance of the Easter Rising, Connolly stored arms, over a dozen 900 Mauser rifles. She served in the GPO garrison during the Easter Rising, where she carried dispatches from James Connolly in the GPO to Ned Daly in Church Street. She was also stationed at the Hibernian Bank during that week. When the retreat from the GPO looked inevitable, Connolly was tasked with leading a group of women from the building by Patrick Pearse and James Connolly on the Friday. She led 30 to 40 women out of the building under a white flag, with the group being arrested and brought to Summerhill. They were released that evening. Connolly was described as by her fellow Cumann na mBan members as being of "highest grade". In the days after the Rising, she mounted a search to find volunteer Paddy Shortis, only to discover he had died in the retreat from the GPO. His family believed they were in a romantic relationship at the time of Shortis' death.

During the War of Independence, she collected and stored arms, and secured safe houses for men on the run. Connolly went to Manchester and Liverpool on the orders of Austin Stack during the Civil War to relay cables to the United States and await the replies. She was attached to the garrison at Barry's Hotel during the attack on the Four Courts in 1922, mobilising men and moving arms under the orders of Oscar Traynor. She was imprisoned after that attack, with Richard Mulcahy ruling her a danger to public safety. She was released in late November 1923.

At the 25th anniversary of the Rising in 1941, she received her 1916 Medal for her role in the GPO. She was number 332 in the 1936 roll of honour, and was awarded three more medals: Service Medal (1917-1921), 1916-1966 Easter Rising Anniversary Commemorative Medal, and Truce (1921) Commemoration Medal.

Connolly died on 15 November 1981, and is buried in the family plot in Grange cemetery, County Carlow.
