= Brigid (given name) =

Brigid is a feminine given name, of which Bridget is a later variation.

== Mythology ==
- Brigid, goddess of pre-Christian Ireland

== People ==
- Brigid of Kildare (c. 451 – 525), Irish Christian Saint
- Brigid Arthur (born 1934), Australian nun and litigation guardian
- Brigid Balfour (1914–1994), British scientist
- Brigid Bazlen (1944–1989), American actress
- Brigid Berlin (1939–2020), American artist
- Brigid Boden, Irish singer
- Brigid Brannagh (born 1972), American actress
- Brigid Brophy (1929–1995), British novelist
- Brigid Carroll, New Zealand professor of management
- Brigid Dawson, American singer
- Brigid Foley (1887–1970), Irish nationalist
- Lady Brigid Guinness (1920–1995), Anglo-Irish wife of Prince Frederick of Prussia
- Brigid Harrington (born 2000), American actress
- Brigid Callahan Harrison (born 1965), American political scientist
- Brigid Hogan (born 1943), British-American biologist
- Brigid Hogan-O'Higgins (1932–2022), Irish politician
- Brigid Hughes, American author
- Brigid Keenan (born 1939), British writer born in India
- Brigid Kosgei (born 1994), Kenyan marathon runner
- Brigid Makowski (1937–2017), Irish politician
- Brigid Lyons Thornton (1896–1987), Irish doctor and revolutionary
- Brigid Tunney (1886–1975), Irish singer

== Fictional Characters ==
- Brigid Tenenbaum, a fictional character in the video game series BioShock.

== See also ==
- Brigid's cross
