= 2021 Hangzhou Spark season =

- Head coach: Hwang "paJion" Ji-sub (Released April 26); Hwang "Andante" Jae-hong (Interim, released July 15)
- General manager: Chen Youyou
- Owner: Rui Chen
- Region: East

Results
- Record: 7–9 (.438)
- Place: East: 5th; League: 14th
- May Melee: Did not qualify
- June Joust: Regional finals
- Summer Showdown: Did not qualify
- Countdown Cup: Did not qualify
- Season Playoffs: Did not qualify
- Total Earnings: $0

The 2021 Hangzhou Spark season was the third season of Hangzhou Spark's existence in the Overwatch League. After their first two games, the Spark released head coach Hwang "paJion" Ji-sub, who became the head coach in the middle of the 2020 season, and promoted Hwang "Andante" Jae-hong to interim head coach. However, he was also released in the second half of the regular season. The Spark finished the regular season in fifth place in the Eastern region. Their season ended after they were eliminated in the play-in tournament tournament semifinals, losing to the Philadelphia Fusion.

== Preceding offseason ==
=== Roster changes ===
The Spark entered free agency with five free agents, all of which became free agents due to the Spark not exercising the option to retain the player for another year.

==== Acquisitions ====
The Spark's first acquisition of the offseason was Zheng "Shy" Yangjie, a rookie damage player promoted from the team's Overwatch Contenders academy team Bilibili Gaming on October 22, 2020. The team's next acquisition came on November 16 with the signing of Jia "LiGe" Chengjie, a rookie tank player coming off of a second-place finish with Team CC in Contenders China. The following day, the Spark signed Lee "MCD" Jeong-ho, a rookie support player from Contenders team Element Mystic. The next day, they signed Lee "Takoyaki" Young-hyun, a rookie tank player coming from Contenders team Team Diamond. One days later, on November 18, Hangzhou signed Shin "Bernar" Se-won, a second-year tank player coming off of a 6–15 season with the London Spitfire. The Spark's final acquisition of the offseason came on November 19 with the signing of Seo "SeoMinSoo" Min-soo, a damage player who is considered one of the best flex damage players in the league with a "very deep pool of heroes to draw from," although he did not compete in the 2020 season.

==== Departures ====
Outside of the Spark's free agents, tank player Yu "QoQ" Sung-jun was released from the team on November 12, 2020. None of the Spark's five free agents returned, three of which signed with other teams, beginning with support player Yoon "Bebe" Hee-chang signing with the Washington Justice on November 19. Three days later, tank player Park "Ria" Sung-wook also signed with the Justice. On March 8, 2021, damage player Chon "Ado" Gi-hyeon signed with Overwatch Contenders team RunAway. Two of the Spark's free agents did not sign with a team in the 2020 offseason: damage player "Adora" Kang Jae-hwan and tank player Song "Sasin" Sang-hyun.

== Regular season ==
After an 0–2 start to the season, the Spark released head coach Hwang "Pajion" Ji-sub and assistant coach Kim "nOrU" Jae-dong on April 26; Hwang "Andante" Jae-hong was promoted to interim head coach and Kim "Mentalist" Chung-in was brought on as an assistant coach.

In the first week of June, the Spark hosted the first live OWL events of the 2021 season, marking the first time that live OWL events took place in China. The live event took place during the June Joust qualifiers; the Spark advanced past the qualifiers with a perfect 4–0 record to the regional knockouts. However, they were defeated by the New York Excelsior in the regional knockouts, 3–1, failing to advance to the interregional tournament. Following the June Joust, on June 22, the Spark parted ways with damage player Kim "GodsB" Kyeon-bo, who had been with the team since their inaugural season.

The following week, one day into the Summer Showdown qualifiers, the Spark released tank player Lee "Takoyaki" Young-hyun. Following a 2–2 record in the qualifiers, the Spark parted ways with interim head coach Hwang "Andante" Jae-hong and assistant coach Kim "Mentalist" Chung-in on July 15, leaving assistant coach assistant coach Chen "U4" Congshan as the only member on the coaching staff. The Spark finished the regular season in fifth place in the Eastern region.

== Postseason ==
As the fifth seed in the Eastern region, the Spark qualified for the play-in tournament. Prior to the play-ins, the Spark released starting tank player Lee "MCD" Jeong-ho, after he made xenophobic remarks towards a Chinese Overwatch Contenders player. Hangzhou's play-in semifinals match took place on September 5, against the Philadelphia Fusion. The Spark lost the match, 1–3, ending their season.

== Final roster ==
2021 Hangzhou Spark roster
Players
Coaches

Role	No.	Handle	Name	Nationality
Damage	17	Shy	Zheng Yangjie	China
Damage	21	Architect	Park Min-ho	South Korea
Damage	18	SeoMinSoo	Seo Min-soo	South Korea
Tank	8	guxue	Xu Qiulin	China
Tank	11	BERNAR	Shin Se-won	South Korea
Tank	22	LiGe (2W)	Jia Chengjie	China
Support	37	iDK	Park Ho-jin	South Korea
Support	13	M1ka	Liu Jiming	China
Support	14	ColdEst	Tong Xiaodong	China

Head coach

- Vacant

Legend:
- (I) Inactive
- (S) Suspended
- (2W) Two-way player
- Substitute
- (injured) Injury / Illness

Latest roster transaction: August 24, 2021.

=== Transactions ===
Transactions of/for players on the roster during the 2021 regular season:

- On June 22, the Spark released damage player Kim "GodsB" Kyeon-bo.
- On June 28, the Spark released tank player Lee "Takoyaki" Young-hyun.
- On August 24, the Spark released support player Lee "MCD" Jeong-ho.

== Standings ==
Pos	Team	Pld	W	L	Pts	PCT	MW	ML	MT	MD	Qualification
1	Shanghai Dragons	16	12	4	20	0.750	38	19	2	+19	Advance to season playoffs
2	Chengdu Hunters	16	11	5	15	0.688	38	22	2	+16	Advance to season playoffs
3	Seoul Dynasty	16	12	4	12	0.750	40	22	0	+18	Advance to play-ins
4	Philadelphia Fusion	16	10	6	10	0.625	37	24	3	+13	Advance to play-ins
5	Hangzhou Spark	16	7	9	7	0.438	32	31	0	+1	Advance to play-ins
6	New York Excelsior	16	7	9	7	0.438	29	32	0	−3	
7	Guangzhou Charge	16	5	11	5	0.313	20	38	4	−18	
8	Los Angeles Valiant	16	0	16	0	0.000	2	48	1	−46	

Source: The Overwatch League
Rules for classification: 1) points; 2) winning percentage (including tournaments); 3) regular season wins; 4) regular season map differential

== Game log ==
=== Regular season ===
2021 game log
May Melee

Qualifier match 1	April 24	Philadelphia Fusion	3	–	1	Hangzhou Spark	Online
	6:30 pm CST	Details					
		1	Lijiang Tower			2	
		3	Watchpoint: Gibraltar			2	
		2	Hanamura			1	
		2	Eichenwalde			1	

Qualifier match 2	April 25	Hangzhou Spark	1	–	3	New York Excelsior	Online
	5:00 pm CST	Details					
		1	Busan			2	
		2	Havana			3	
		2	Volskaya Industries			0	
		1	King's Row			3	

Qualifier match 3	April 30	Shanghai Dragons	3	–	2	Hangzhou Spark	Online
	8:00 pm CST	Details					
		2	Nepal			0	
		2	Volskaya Industries			4	
		0	King's Row			3	
		1	Havana			0	
		2	Busan			0	

Qualifier match 4	May 01	Guangzhou Charge	0	–	3	Hangzhou Spark	Online
	6:30 pm CST	Details					
		1	Oasis			2	
		1	Temple of Anubis			2	
		2	Blizzard World			3	

June Joust

Qualifier match 1	May 22	Guangzhou Charge	1	–	3	Hangzhou Spark	Online
	5:00 pm CST	Details					
		2	Lijiang Tower			0	
		2	Eichenwalde			3	
		1	Dorado			3	
		3	Temple of Anubis			4	

Qualifier match 2	May 23	Shanghai Dragons	0	–	3	Hangzhou Spark	Online
	5:00 pm CST	Details					
		1	Nepal			2	
		3	Numbani			4	
		0	Rialto			1	

Qualifier match 3	June 04	Los Angeles Valiant	0	–	3	Hangzhou Spark	Hangzhou, CN
	8:00 pm CST	Details					Future Sci-Tech City
Hosted by Hangzhou Spark
		0	Oasis			2	
		0	Hanamura			2	
		1	Hollywood			2	

Qualifier match 4	June 05	Chengdu Hunters	1	–	3	Hangzhou Spark	Hangzhou, CN
	8:00 pm CST	Details					Future Sci-Tech City
Hosted by Hangzhou Spark
		1	Ilios			2	
		3	Volskaya Industries			2	
		3	Numbani			5	
		2	Rialto			3	

Regional finals	June 06	New York Excelsior	3	–	1	Hangzhou Spark	Hangzhou, CN
	5:00 pm CST	Details					Future Sci-Tech City
Hosted by Hangzhou Spark
		0	Oasis			2	
		2	Temple of Anubis			0	
		3	Numbani			2	
		1	Dorado			0	

Summer Showdown

Qualifier match 1	June 26	Hangzhou Spark	3	–	0	Los Angeles Valiant	Online
	5:00 pm CST	Details					
		2	Lijiang Tower			1	
		2	Eichenwalde			1	
		1	Route 66			0	

Qualifier match 2	June 27	Hangzhou Spark	0	–	3	Seoul Dynasty	Online
	5:00 pm CST	Details					
		1	Nepal			2	
		3	King's Row			4	
		2	Junkertown			3	

Qualifier match 3	July 09	Hangzhou Spark	3	–	2	New York Excelsior	Shanghai, CN
	5:00 pm CST	Details					Jing'An Sports Center
Hosted by Shanghai Dragons
		1	Oasis			2	
		3	Volskaya Industries			2	
		3	King's Row			2	
		2	Junkertown			3	
		2	Nepal			0	

Qualifier match 4	July 10	Hangzhou Spark	1	–	3	Shanghai Dragons	Shanghai, CN
	8:00 pm CST	Details					Jing'An Sports Center
Hosted by Shanghai Dragons
		0	Ilios			2	
		1	Hanamura			2	
		2	Hollywood			1	
		1	Watchpoint: Gibraltar			2	

Countdown Cup

Qualifier match 1	July 31	Hangzhou Spark	2	–	3	Seoul Dynasty	Online
	5:00 pm CST	Details					
		2	Lijiang Tower			0	
		3	King's Row			2	
		0	Rialto			3	
		2	Volskaya Industries			3	
		1	Oasis			2	

Qualifier match 2	August 01	Hangzhou Spark	1	–	3	Philadelphia Fusion	Online
	8:00 pm CST	Details					
		2	Nepal			1	
		1	Blizzard World			2	
		0	Route 66			3	
		1	Temple of Anubis			2	

Qualifier match 3	August 13	Hangzhou Spark	1	–	3	Chengdu Hunters	Online
	5:00 pm CST	Details					
		0	Busan			2	
		2	Hanamura			1	
		3	King's Row			4	
		1	Havana			2	

Qualifier match 4	August 14	Guangzhou Charge	3	–	2	Hangzhou Spark	Online
	5:00 pm CST	Details					
		2	Ilios			0	
		3	Volskaya Industries			4	
		4	Numbani			5	
		3	Rialto			2	
		2	Lijiang Tower			1	

2021 season schedule

=== Postseason ===
2021 playoff game log
East Play-ins

Semifinals	September 5	Hangzhou Spark	1	–	3	Philadelphia Fusion	Online
	5:05 pm CST	Details					
		2	Oasis			1	
		2	Volskaya Industries			3	
		1	King's Row			2	
		0	Route 66			1	
