= Pine (gamer) =

South Korean gamer

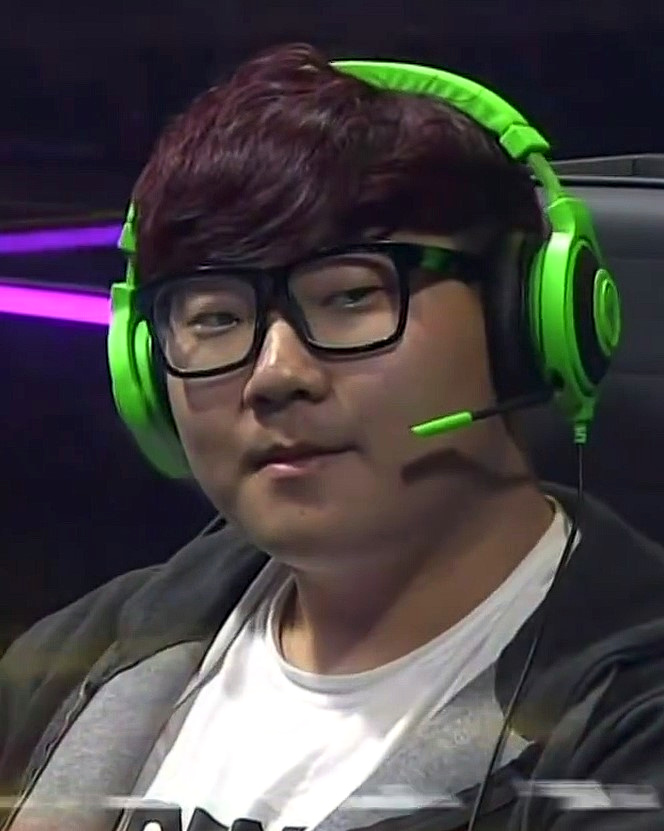

Personal information
- Name: 김도현 (Kim Do-hyeon)
- Nickname: Big Boss Pine
- Born: 1997 or 1998 (age 28–29); Seoul, South Korea

Career information
- Game: Overwatch
- Playing career: 2016–2019, 2021–present
- Role: Damage

Team history
- 2016–2017: LW Red
- 2017: LW Blue
- 2018–2019: New York Excelsior
- 2021: Dallas Fuel

Career highlights and awards
- 2× OWL Stage champion (2018); 2× OWL All-Star (2018, 2019)

Kim Do-hyeon (Korean: 김도현), better known as his online alias Pine, is a South Korean professional Overwatch player of the Overwatch League (OWL). Kim began his professional career with LW Blue in the Overwatch APEX series. In 2018, Kim signed with the New York Excelsior for the Overwatch League inaugural season. After playing for two seasons with New York, he announced his decision to retire from professional Overwatch, becoming an active streamer affiliated with Andbox, NY Excelsior's parent company. He returned to active competition with the Dallas Fuel for the 2021 season. Kim is currently a free agent.

== Early life ==
Pine was born and raised in Seoul, South Korea with an older brother and sister. When he was young, he was diagnosed with ADHD which made it more difficult for him to make friends and socialize. Later in school, he became interested in playing badminton and continued to do so competitively until he had to stop because of a toe injury. Throughout middle school and high school, he played FPS, such as Team Fortress 2. Due to his fascination with playing video games, his relationship with his parents became strained. After high school, he decided to go enroll in a culinary arts university, only to drop out after the first semester in order to pursue a career in esports.

== Professional career ==
=== LW Blue ===
Pine was signed onto the team LW Blue as a DPS for the Overwatch APEX competition in April 2017. He played for LW Blue until signing on with the New York Excelsior in October 2017.

=== New York Excelsior ===
==== 2018 season ====
Kim was picked up by New York Excelsior (NYXL) as a flex DPS for the 2018 season of Overwatch League. Although he only played when needed, he garnered a large amount of attention due to his high-risk, high-reward playstyle and his lightheartedness. In Stage 1, when the NYXL was facing the Houston Outlaws, he played as McCree and almost eliminated the entire enemy team. During this play, caster Erik "DoA" Lonnquist crowned him "Big Boss Pine," which became the catalyst for Kim's nickname "Big Boss Pine."

Although he performed well in Stage 1, he missed all but one week in Stage 2. After getting reverse swept by the London Spitfire in the Stage 1 Finals, he said that he felt very stressed because it was the only match that he had played in, and the stress built into depression. Not only did he have to cope with depression, but he also had a panic disorder. The nickname that he earned from Stage 1 pressured him into trying to constantly perform extremely well in order to live up to the expectations of fans. This combined with his mental health issues, worsened the blow when he noticed that the only game that NYXL lost in Stage 2 was when he played. He was able to overcome these disorders with help from the people around him, especially Andrew Kim, the player manager for NYXL, who would come up to him and encourage him to open up about his issues. This led to Kim to decide to take time off before returning to the Overwatch League stage. This development also shed light on the importance of mental health among esports players and the rigor of their daily schedules.

==== 2019 season ====
While Kim was still a part of the New York Excelsior, he made no appearance on the Overwatch League stage during the regular second season. This was due to the change in metas in Overwatch, where a team composition of three tanks and three healers (GOATS) was favored over DPS. He made an appearance at the All Star event as a starter for Atlantic team's roster.

Towards the end of Overwatch League Season 2, Kim made a statement during one of his streams (later uploaded to YouTube) that "the game Overwatch doesn't agree with [him]," and that they have different goals. Starting with Stage 1 in Season 2 of Overwatch League, Kim stated that he felt lost during that time because the meta did not favor his hero pool. Although in Stages 3 and 4, there was a favorable meta change for him, he thought that his team would get into trouble if he asked for a match. This was also due to his acknowledgement of being an inconsistent player. Pine stated that his confidence was being shaken, because although he wanted to play, he always remained on the bench, even when he asked to be put in. After Season 2 of Overwatch League ended, it was announced by NYXL that Pine was retiring and that he would continue to be an affiliated streamer with Andbox, NYXL's parent company.

=== Dallas Fuel ===
==== 2021 season ====
On May 10, 2021, Kim was signed by the Dallas Fuel. Due to visa issues, Kim was unable to join the team in Dallas until August 9, 2021 — one day after the Fuel's final regular season match. The Fuel elected not to exercise their option to retain Kim for the 2022 OWL season.
