= 2021 Dallas Fuel season =

- West Region champions
- Head coach: Yun "RUSH" Hee-won
- General manager: Mathew Taylor
- Owner: Envy Gaming
- Region: West

Results
- Record: 11–5 (.688)
- Place: West: 1st; League: 2nd
- May Melee: Champions
- June Joust: Finals
- Summer Showdown: Lower finals
- Countdown Cup: Regional semifinals
- Season Playoffs: Lower final
- Total Earnings: $555,000

The 2021 Dallas Fuel season was the Dallas Fuel's fourth season in the Overwatch League and the team's first under head coach Yun "RUSH" Hee-won. The team qualified for three of the four midseason tournaments throughout the regular season and won the franchise's first Overwatch League title after defeating the Shanghai Dragons in the May Melee finals. Finishing the regular season atop the West region, the Fuel reached the season playoffs for the first time in the franchise's history; however, they were defeated by the Atlanta Reign in the lower bracket finals. Head coach Yun "RUSH" Hee-won won the league's Coach of the Year award, damage player Kim "Sp9rk1e" Yeong-han was awarded the league's Dennis Hawelka Award, and four players were awarded Role Star commendations, tied for the most players in the league.

== Preceding offseason ==
=== Organizational changes ===
In October 2020, the Fuel signed former Overwatch Contenders team Element Mystic head coach Yun "RUSH" Hee-won as the Fuel's new head coach. The following week, they signed Go "Aid" Jae-yoon as an assistant coach and confirmed that 2020 interim head coach Kim "Yong" Yong-jin would remain with the team as an assistant coach.

=== Roster changes ===
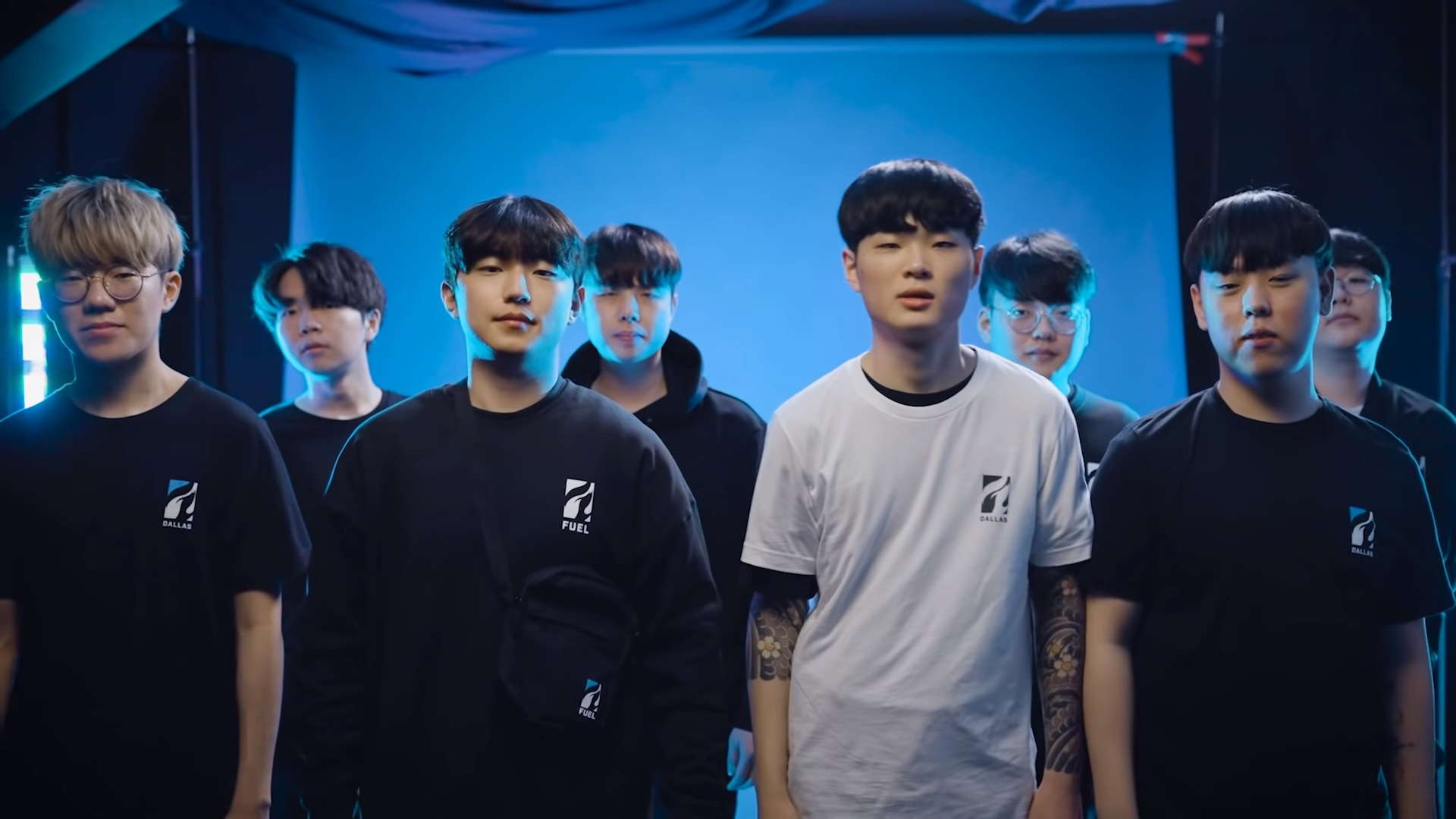
The Fuel roster heading into the 2021 season. From left to right: SP9RK1E, Doha, Rapel, Fearless, Xzi, Hanbin, Fielder, Jecse

The Fuel entered the free agency with nine free agents, all of which became free agents due to the Fuel not exercising the option to retain the player for another year.

==== Acquisitions ====
The Fuel's first offseason acquisition were Kim "SP9RK1E" Young-han and Choi "Hanbin" Han-been, damage players who were both acquired from the Paris Eternal on October 23, 2020. Four days later, the Fuel addressed their support line with the signings of Kwon "Fielder" Joon, a "big impact" support player for the Paris Eternal in 2020, and Kim "Rapel" Jung-keun, a "serviceable backup and second option" support player who played for the Houston Outlaws in 2020. The Fuel acquired several players in November; on November 7, 2020, they acquired Lee "Fearless" Eui-seok, a tank player who was "considered arguably the best main tank player in the world" with the Shanghai Dragons the previous season. The Fuel added another support player three days later with the signing of Lee "Jecse" Seung-soo, a third-year support player who also played for the Outlaws in 2020. On November 14, 2020, Dallas acquired Jung "Xzi" Ki-hyo, a damage player and hitscan specialist who was an Overwatch League MVP finalist in 2020, from the Paris Eternal.

==== Departures ====
None of the Fuel's nine free agents returned, four of which signing with other teams, beginning with support player Jung "Closer" Won-sik signing with the Washington Justice on November 20, 2020. Four days later, support player William "Crimzo" Hernandez signed with the Houston Outlaws. On December 9, 2020, the Fuel lost damage player Stefan "Onigod" Fiskerstrand, who signed with Paris Eternal, and support player Nolan "Paintbrush" Edwards, who signed with Overwatch Contenders team Revival. Four of the Fuel's free agents retired: damage player Dylan "AKM" Bignet, tank player Noh "Gamsu" Young-jin, tank player Ashley "Trill" Powell, and support player Benjamin "Unkoe" Chevasson. Dallas' final free agent, tank player Lucas "Note" Meissner did not sign with a team in the offseason. Outside of their free agents, the Fuel parted ways with damage player Jung "Xzi" Ki-hyo on April 13, 2021, leaving the Fuel without a dedicated hitscan player; Jung had signed with the earlier in the offseason but retired from professional Overwatch due health issues.

== Regular season ==
The Fuel began their 2021 season on April 16, playing against in-state rival Houston Outlaws in the May Melee qualifiers. After trading wins throughout the first four maps, the Fuel lost the match after losing map five. The Fuel finished the qualifiers with a 2–2 win–loss record and qualified for the regional knockout round as the Western region's sixth, and final, seed. Dallas defeated the San Francisco Shock and the Houston Outlaws in the knockouts to advance to the interregional tournament bracket. Entering as the Western region's second seed, Dallas faced the Eastern region's top-seeded Chengdu Hunters on May 6 in the first round of the double-elimination tournament. Still without a dedicated hitscan player after Jung "Xzi" Ki-hyo departed late in the offseason, Dallas ran an "off-brand rush meta that finishes fights quickly", and after the Hunters won the third map of the series, which ended the Fuel's 11-map winning streak, Dallas won a "scrappy" fourth map to advance to the upper bracket finals. The Fuel took on the Shanghai Dragons in the upper finals on May 7. After five maps, the series was tied 2–2; a series-ending pulse-bomb from Kim "Sp9rk1e" Yeong-han playing as Tracer gave the Fuel the win and advanced the team to their first-ever Overwatch League final. After the Dragons made their way through the lower bracket of the tournament, the two teams again faced each other in the May Melee Grand Finals. After a back-and-forth series, the Fuel were ahead 3–2 going into the sixth map. In map six, Dallas' Kim "Sp9rk1e" Yeong-han effectively played as Soldier: 76, giving tank player Lee "Fearless" Eui-seok "infinite space ... to cause chaos;" the Fuel won the series 4–2, giving the franchise their first Overwatch League title.

Prior to the beginning of following tournament cycle, the June Joust, the Fuel signed hitscan specialist Kim "Pine" Do-hyeon. Dallas won three of their four qualifying matches — the one loss being to the Shock, which snapped the Fuel's seven-game winning streak in the process. In the regional knockouts, the Fuel defeated the Los Angeles Gladiators and Houston Outlaws to advance to their second consecutive midseason tournament. In the first round of the tournament, the Fuel defeated the Dragons in a 3–0 sweep. The win advanced them to the upper bracket finals, where the Fuel took down the Atlanta Reign, 3–1, behind strong performances by their damage players Kim "Doha" Dong-ha and Kim "Sp9rk1e" Yeong-han. After the Dragons advanced through the lower bracket, the Fuel once again faced the Dragons in the tournament finals. Midway through the match, the Fuel found themselves up 3–1 in the first-to-four series. However, Dallas lost the following three maps, losing the match 3–4.

The Fuel went undefeated in their four qualifying matches of the Summer Showdown, the third tournament cycle of the regular season. In the qualifiers, the Fuel hosted the team's first live event since February 2020 at Esports Stadium Arlington. In the regional knockouts, Dallas received a bye in the first round, advancing them directly to the regional finals, where they defeated the Washington Justice. In their third consecutive tournament appearance, Dallas faced the Chengdu Hunters in the first round. The Fuel took an early lead, winning the first map of the series, but lost the following three to lose the match 1–3, dropping them to the lower bracket of the tournament. After defeating the Reign in the first round of the lower bracket, Dallas was handed its worse loss of the season in a 0–3 loss to the Hunters in the lower bracket finals.

In the final tournament cycle of the regular season, the Countdown Cup, the Fuel went 2–2 in the qualifiers, and in the regional knockouts, they fell to the Shock, marking the first time in the season they did not qualify for a midseason tournament. In regards to the team's poor performance in the tournament cycle, Fuel head coach Yun "RUSH" Hee-won stated that he had "lessened the amount of practice" the players were having due to the amount of work and travel the players had been experiencing throughout the season.

The team finished the regular season at the top of the standings in the West region with 11 wins, 5 losses, 17 league points. The finish gave them the second seed in the season playoffs, behind the top-seeded Shanghai Dragons. Head coach Yun "RUSH" Hee-won was named the league's coach of the year and damage player Kim "SP9RK1E" Yeong-han received the Dennis Hawelka award. Additionally, Kim "SP9RK1E" Young-han, Lee "Fearless" Eui-seok, Choi "Hanbin" Han-been, and Joon "Fielder" Kwon awarded Role Star commendations. With four players, the Fuel were tied with the Dragons for the most players receiving the award.

== Playoffs ==
Dallas selected the eighth-seeded Washington Justice as their opponent for the first round of the season playoffs. Dallas won the match, 3–1, advancing to the second round of the upper bracket. The team next swept the third-seeded Chengdu Hunters, 3–0, advancing them to the upper bracket finals. Moving on to the upper bracket finals, the Fuel faced the top-seeded Shanghai Dragons, marking the fifth time the two teams had played each other in a midseason or season playoff match in the 2021 season. Despite keeping the maps close, the Fuel lost the match, 1–3, sending them to the lower bracket. Sent to the lower bracket finals, the Fuel next faced the fifth-seeded Atlanta Reign. The two teams were tied 1–1 after two maps, but the Fuel lost the following two maps, losing the match 1–3 and ending their playoff run.

== Final roster ==
2021 Dallas Fuel roster
Players
Coaches

Role	No.	Handle	Name	Nationality
Damage	20	Doha	Kim Dong-ha	South Korea
Damage	1	Sp9rk1e	Kim Yeong-han	South Korea
Damage	24	Pine	Kim Do-hyeon	South Korea
Tank	8	Fearless	Lee Eui-seok	South Korea
Tank	11	Hanbin	Choi Han-been	South Korea
Support	21	Jecse	Lee Seung-soo	South Korea
Support	31	Fielder	Kwon Joon	South Korea
Support	7	Rapel	Kim Jun-keun	South Korea

Head coach

- Yun "RUSH" Hee-won

Legend:
- (I) Inactive
- (S) Suspended
- (2W) Two-way player
- Substitute
- (injured) Injury / Illness

Latest roster transaction: May 10, 2021.

=== Transactions ===
Transactions of/for players on the roster during the 2021 regular season:

- On May 10, the Fuel signed damage player Kim "Pine" Do-hyeon.

== Standings ==
Pos	Team	Pld	W	L	Pts	PCT	MW	ML	MT	MD	Qualification
1	Dallas Fuel	16	11	5	17	0.688	40	26	3	+14	Advance to season playoffs
2	Los Angeles Gladiators	16	11	5	14	0.688	41	21	0	+20	Advance to season playoffs
3	Atlanta Reign	16	11	5	13	0.688	41	21	0	+20	Advance to season playoffs
4	San Francisco Shock	16	12	4	12	0.750	43	24	2	+19	Advance to play-ins
5	Houston Outlaws	16	11	5	11	0.688	34	24	3	+10	Advance to play-ins
6	Washington Justice	16	9	7	9	0.563	29	26	2	+3	Advance to play-ins
7	Toronto Defiant	16	9	7	9	0.563	31	31	0	0	Advance to play-ins
8	Paris Eternal	16	8	8	8	0.500	32	32	2	0	Advance to play-ins
9	Boston Uprising	16	7	9	7	0.438	27	31	1	−4	Advance to play-ins
10	Florida Mayhem	16	5	11	6	0.313	26	38	2	−12	
11	London Spitfire	16	1	15	1	0.063	12	47	1	−35	
12	Vancouver Titans	16	1	15	1	0.063	10	45	0	−35	

Source: The Overwatch League
Rules for classification: 1) points; 2) winning percentage (including tournaments); 3) regular season wins; 4) regular season map differential

== Game log ==
=== Regular season ===
2021 game log
May Melee

Qualifier match 1	April 16	Houston Outlaws	3	–	2	Dallas Fuel	Online
	2:00 pm CDT	Details					
		2	Busan			1	
		2	King's Row			3	
		3	Havana			2	
		3	Volskaya Industries			4	
		2	Ilios			0	

Qualifier match 2	April 17	Dallas Fuel	3	–	1	Los Angeles Gladiators	Online
	5:00 pm CDT	Details					
		2	Lijiang Tower			1	
		4	Blizzard World			3	
		2	Dorado			3	
		2	Temple of Anubis			1	

Qualifier match 3	April 24	Washington Justice	3	–	1	Dallas Fuel	Online
	5:00 pm CDT	Details					
		2	Ilios			0	
		4	Watchpoint: Gibraltar			5	
		2	Hanamura			1	
		4	Eichenwalde			3	

Qualifier match 4	April 25	Boston Uprising	0	–	3	Dallas Fuel	Online
	3:30 pm CDT	Details					
		0	Nepal			2	
		1	Havana			2	
		3	Volskaya Industries			4	

Regional semifinals	May 02	Dallas Fuel	3	–	0	San Francisco Shock	Online
	3:30 pm CDT	Details					
		2	Busan			0	
		2	Volskaya Industries			1	
		3	Eichenwalde			1	

Regional finals	May 02	Dallas Fuel	3	–	0	Houston Outlaws	Online
	6:30 pm CDT	Details					
		2	Busan			0	
		3	Volskaya Industries			2	
		4	Blizzard World			3	

Tournament first round	May 06	Dallas Fuel	3	–	1	Chengdu Hunters	Online
	10:30 pm CDT	Details					
		2	Nepal			1	
		2	Temple of Anubis			1	
		0	Blizzard World			1	
		4	Watchpoint: Gibraltar			3	

Upper finals	May 07	Dallas Fuel	3	–	2	Shanghai Dragons	Online
	8:00 pm CDT	Details					
		2	Ilios			0	
		2	Temple of Anubis			2	
		1	Blizzard World			2	
		3	Watchpoint: Gibraltar			2	
		0	Oasis			2	
		2	Dorado			0	

Grand finals	May 08	Shanghai Dragons	2	–	4	Dallas Fuel	Online
	8:00 pm CDT	Details					
		0	Lijiang Tower			2	
		1	Temple of Anubis			0	
		2	King's Row			3	
		2	Watchpoint: Gibraltar			3	
		2	Ilios			0	
		1	Blizzard World			2	

June Joust

Qualifier match 1	May 28	London Spitfire	0	–	3	Dallas Fuel	Online
	2:00 pm CDT	Details					
		0	Nepal			2	
		1	Junkertown			3	
		2	Hanamura			3	

Qualifier match 2	May 30	Dallas Fuel	1	–	3	San Francisco Shock	Online
	5:00 pm CDT	Details					
		1	Busan			2	
		1	Dorado			2	
		3	Temple of Anubis			3	
		3	Eichenwalde			1	
		1	Ilios			2	

Qualifier match 3	June 03	Dallas Fuel	3	–	2	Florida Mayhem	Online
	3:30 pm CDT	Details					
		1	Lijiang Tower			2	
		3	Hanamura			2	
		4	Hollywood			3	
		1	Junkertown			3	
		2	Oasis			0	

Qualifier match 4	June 05	Vancouver Titans	0	–	3	Dallas Fuel	Online
	3:30 pm CDT	Details					
		0	Oasis			2	
		0	Volskaya Industries			2	
		0	Numbani			3	

Regional semifinals	June 06	Dallas Fuel	3	–	0	Houston Outlaws	Online
	2:00 pm CDT	Details					
		2	Busan			0	
		2	Hanamura			1	
		3	Eichenwalde			2	

Regional finals	June 06	Dallas Fuel	3	–	1	Los Angeles Gladiators	Online
	4:30 pm CDT	Details					
		2	Oasis			1	
		3	Hanamura			2	
		0	Hollywood			1	
		3	Junkertown			2	

Tournament first round	June 10	Dallas Fuel	3	–	0	Shanghai Dragons	Online
	9:30 pm CDT	Details					
		2	Busan			0	
		2	Volskaya Industries			1	
		3	Numbani			2	

Upper finals	June 11	Dallas Fuel	3	–	1	Atlanta Reign	Online
	8:00 pm CDT	Details					
		1	Nepal			2	
		3	Volskaya Industries			2	
		3	Numbani			2	
		2	Rialto			1	

Grand finals	June 12	Shanghai Dragons	4	–	3	Dallas Fuel	Online
	8:00 pm CDT	Details					
		0	Lijiang Tower			2	
		0	Volskaya Industries			2	
		2	Numbani			1	
		3	Rialto			4	
		2	Busan			1	
		3	Eichenwalde			2	
		2	Junkertown			1	

Summer Showdown

Qualifier match 1	July 03	Dallas Fuel	3	–	2	Florida Mayhem	Online
	3:30 pm CDT	Details					
		2	Lijiang Tower			1	
		1	Watchpoint: Gibraltar			2	
		2	Hanamura			0	
		3	Hollywood			4	
		2	Oasis			0	

Qualifier match 2	July 04	Atlanta Reign	2	–	3	Dallas Fuel	Online
	2:00 pm CDT	Details					
		1	Nepal			2	
		3	Route 66			1	
		0	Temple of Anubis			2	
		3	Eichenwalde			2	
		0	Busan			2	

Qualifier match 3	July 09	Dallas Fuel	3	–	0	Houston Outlaws	Arlington, TX
	5:00 pm CDT	Details					Esports Stadium Arlington
		2	Oasis			0	
		2	Hanamura			2	
		2	Hollywood			1	
		2	Watchpoint: Gibraltar			1	

Qualifier match 4	July 10	Toronto Defiant	1	–	3	Dallas Fuel	Online
	3:30 pm CDT	Details					
		0	Busan			2	
		1	Volskaya Industries			2	
		2	King's Row			1	
		1	Junkertown			3	

Regional finals	July 11	Washington Justice	2	–	3	Dallas Fuel	Online
	5:00 pm CDT	Details					
		2	Lijiang Tower			1	
		1	Volskaya Industries			2	
		1	King's Row			3	
		2	Route 66			1	
		0	Nepal			2	

Tournament first round	July 15	Chengdu Hunters	3	–	1	Dallas Fuel	Online
	8:00 pm CDT	Details					
		1	Lijiang Tower			2	
		4	Volskaya Industries			3	
		3	King's Row			2	
		3	Watchpoint: Gibraltar			1	

Lower round 1	July 16	Atlanta Reign	2	–	3	Dallas Fuel	Online
	10:15 pm CDT	Details					
		0	Lijiang Tower			2	
		2	Hanamura			1	
		5	King's Row			6	
		3	Route 66			2	
		1	Nepal			2	

Lower finals	July 17	Chengdu Hunters	3	–	0	Dallas Fuel	Online
	12:35 am CDT	Details					
		2	Lijiang Tower			0	
		3	Temple of Anubis			2	
		2	King's Row			1	

Countdown Cup

Qualifier match 1	July 30	Dallas Fuel	2	–	3	Paris Eternal	Online
	2:00 pm CDT	Details					
		1	Lijiang Tower			2	
		5	Blizzard World			4	
		0	Havana			3	
		2	Temple of Anubis			1	
		1	Oasis			2	

Qualifier match 2	July 31	Dallas Fuel	3	–	2	San Francisco Shock	Online
	5:00 pm CDT	Details					
		2	Ilios			1	
		2	Numbani			3	
		4	Rialto			3	
		1	Hanamura			2	
		2	Lijiang Tower			1	

Qualifier match 3	August 07	Dallas Fuel	3	–	1	London Spitfire	Online
	2:00 pm CDT	Details					
		2	Nepal			0	
		0	Route 66			3	
		3	Volskaya Industries			3	
		3	King's Row			0	
		2	Busan			1	

Qualifier match 4	August 08	Atlanta Reign	3	–	1	Dallas Fuel	Online
	3:30 pm CDT	Details					
		2	Busan			0	
		4	Rialto			3	
		3	Temple of Anubis			4	
		3	Blizzard World			0	

Regional semifinals	August 15	Dallas Fuel	0	–	3	San Francisco Shock	Online
	3:45 pm CDT	Details					
		0	Oasis			2	
		3	Temple of Anubis			4	
		1	Blizzard World			3	

2021 season schedule

=== Postseason ===
2021 playoff game log
Season Playoffs

Upper round 1	September 21	Washington Justice	1	–	3	Dallas Fuel	Online
	6:00 pm CDT	Details					
		2	Lijiang Tower			1	
		1	Volskaya Industries			2	
		2	King's Row			3	
		3	Havana			4	

Upper round 2	September 22	Chengdu Hunters	0	–	3	Dallas Fuel	Online
	9:00 pm CDT	Details					
		0	Lijiang Tower			2	
		2	Volskaya Industries			3	
		0	Eichenwalde			3	

Upper final	September 23	Dallas Fuel	1	–	3	Shanghai Dragons	Online
	9:30 pm CDT	Details					
		0	Ilios			2	
		3	Volskaya Industries			2	
		2	Numbani			3	
		1	Dorado			3	

Lower final	September 24	Atlanta Reign	3	–	1	Dallas Fuel	Online
	9:30 pm CDT	Details					
		1	Lijiang Tower			2	
		2	Hanamura			1	
		4	King's Row			3	
		3	Dorado			2	
