= 2021 Philadelphia Fusion season =

Overwatch League team season

- Head coach: Kim "NineK" Bum-hoon
- Owner: Comcast Spectacor
- Region: East

Results
- Record: 10–6 (.625)
- Place: East: 4th; League: 10th
- May Melee: Regional finals
- June Joust: Did not qualify
- Summer Showdown: Did not qualify
- Countdown Cup: Regional finals
- Season Playoffs: Lower round 1
- Total Earnings: $50,000

The 2021 Philadelphia Fusion season was the fourth season of the Philadelphia Fusion's existence in the Overwatch League and their first under head coach Kim "NineK" Bum-hoon.

== Preceding offseason ==
=== Roster changes ===
Free agents
Position	Handle	Name	2021 team	Date signed	Notes
Support	Boombox	Isaac Charles	Young and Beautiful (OWC)	March 10	–
Damage	Chipsa	Philip Graham	–	–	Option declined
Damage	Eqo	Josue Corona	Philadelphia Fusion	November 18	Option declined
Tank	Fury	Kim Jun-ho	Washington Justice	November 21	–
Damage	Ivy	Lee Seung-hyun	New York Excelsior	December 22	–
Tank	Poko	Gael Gouzerch	Philadelphia Fusion	November 17	Option declined
Tank	Sado	Kim Su-min	Toronto Defiant	November 21	Option declined
Legend Light green background indicates a player was re-signed by the Fusion. Light red background indicates a player departed from the Fusion.

The Fusion entered free agency with seven free agents, four of which became free agents due to the team not exercising the option to retain the player for another year.

==== Acquisitions ====
The Fusion's first offseason acquisition was Kim "Mano" Dong-gyu, a veteran tank player coming from the New York Excelsior who signed on November 2, 2020. The Fusion next signed Niclas "Shockwave" Jensen, a second-year damage playing who played for the Vancouver Titans in mid-2020, on November 23. Philadelphia did not pick up another player until 2021; on March 15, they signed Kim "Rascal" Dong-jun, a veteran damage player coming off back-to-back Grand Finals championships with the San Francisco Shock. The Fusion next signed Choi "Hotba" Hong-jun, a tank player from the Excelsior who was a part of the Fusion's 2018 Grand Finals team, on April 7. One day later, they signed Yang "Tobi" Jin-mo, a veteran support player coming off a Grand Finals appearance with the Seoul Dynasty in 2020.

==== Departures ====
Five of the Fusion's seven free agents did not return, four of which signed with other teams, beginning with tank players Kim "Fury" Jun-ho and Kim "Sado" Su-min, who signed with the Washington Justice and Toronto Defiant, respectively, on November 21, 2020. The Fusion lost damage player Lee "Ivy" Seung-hyun on December 22 after he signed with the New York Excelsior. Support player Isaac "Boombox" Charles signed with Overwatch Contenders team Young and Beautiful on March 10, 2021. The Fusion's final free agent, damage player Philip "Chipsa" Graham did not sign with a team in the offseason. Outside of free agency, the Fusion transferred damage player Jeong "Heesu" Hee-su to the Toronto Defiant on November 23, 2020.

== Regular season ==
=== May Melee ===
The Fusion began their 2021 season on April 17, with a 3–1 win over the Seoul Dynasty in the May Melee qualifiers. In their following match, they swept the Los Angeles Valiant 3–0.

== Final roster ==
2021 Philadelphia Fusion roster
Players
Coaches

Role	No.	Handle	Name	Nationality
Damage	18	Carpe	Lee Jae-hyeok	South Korea
Damage	24	sHockWave (2W)	Jensen, Niclas	Denmark
Damage	15	EQO	Corona, Josue	Israel
Damage	27	Rascal	Kim Dong-jun	South Korea
Tank	7	Mano	Kim Dong-gyu	South Korea
Tank	8	HOTBA	Choi Hong-joon	South Korea
Tank	21	Poko (2W)	Gouzerch, Gael	France
Support	4	tobi	Yang Jin-mo	South Korea
Support	33	FunnyAstro (2W)	Hathaway, Daniel	United Kingdom
Support	17	Alarm	Kim Kyung-bo	South Korea

Head coach

- Kim "NineK" Bum-hoon

Legend:
- (I) Inactive
- (S) Suspended
- (2W) Two-way player
- Substitute
- (injured) Injury / Illness

Latest roster transaction: April 8, 2021.

== Standings ==
Pos	Team	Pld	W	L	Pts	PCT	MW	ML	MT	MD	Qualification
1	Shanghai Dragons	16	12	4	20	0.750	38	19	2	+19	Advance to season playoffs
2	Chengdu Hunters	16	11	5	15	0.688	38	22	2	+16	Advance to season playoffs
3	Seoul Dynasty	16	12	4	12	0.750	40	22	0	+18	Advance to play-ins
4	Philadelphia Fusion	16	10	6	10	0.625	37	24	3	+13	Advance to play-ins
5	Hangzhou Spark	16	7	9	7	0.438	32	31	0	+1	Advance to play-ins
6	New York Excelsior	16	7	9	7	0.438	29	32	0	−3	
7	Guangzhou Charge	16	5	11	5	0.313	20	38	4	−18	
8	Los Angeles Valiant	16	0	16	0	0.000	2	48	1	−46	

Source: The Overwatch League
Rules for classification: 1) points; 2) winning percentage (including tournaments); 3) regular season wins; 4) regular season map differential

== Game log ==
=== Regular season ===
2021 game log
May Melee

Qualifier match 1	April 17	Philadelphia Fusion	3	–	1	Seoul Dynasty	Online
	8:00 am EDT	Details					
		2	Oasis			1	
		4	Blizzard World			3	
		2	Dorado			3	
		3	Temple of Anubis			2	

Qualifier match 2	April 18	Philadelphia Fusion	3	–	0	Los Angeles Valiant	Online
	8:00 am EDT	Details					
		2	Busan			1	
		3	Eichenwalde			2	
		3	Watchpoint: Gibraltar			2	

Qualifier match 3	April 24	Philadelphia Fusion	3	–	1	Hangzhou Spark	Online
	6:30 am EDT	Details					
		1	Lijiang Tower			2	
		3	Watchpoint: Gibraltar			2	
		2	Hanamura			1	
		2	Eichenwalde			1	

Qualifier match 4	April 25	Chengdu Hunters	1	–	3	Philadelphia Fusion	Online
	6:30 am EDT	Details					
		1	Ilios			2	
		0	Havana			1	
		3	Volskaya Industries			2	
		2	King's Row			3	

Regional finals	May 02	Shanghai Dragons	3	–	2	Philadelphia Fusion	Online
	5:00 am EDT	Details					
		2	Nepal			1	
		2	Volskaya Industries			2	
		1	Eichenwalde			2	
		0	Havana			1	
		2	Ilios			1	
		5	Watchpoint: Gibraltar			4	

June Joust

Qualifier match 1	May 22	New York Excelsior	3	–	1	Philadelphia Fusion	Online
	8:00 am EDT	Details					
		2	Lijiang Tower			0	
		3	Numbani			0	
		2	Rialto			3	
		2	Volskaya Industries			0	

Qualifier match 2	May 23	Philadelphia Fusion	1	–	3	Chengdu Hunters	Online
	8:00 am EDT	Details					
		0	Busan			2	
		1	Eichenwalde			2	
		2	Dorado			1	
		1	Temple of Anubis			1	
		0	Ilios			2	

Qualifier match 3	June 04	Guangzhou Charge	0	–	3	Philadelphia Fusion	Online
	5:00 am EDT	Details					
		0	Oasis			2	
		3	Hanamura			3	
		1	Hollywood			3	
		1	Junkertown			3	

Qualifier match 4	June 05	Los Angeles Valiant	1	–	3	Philadelphia Fusion	Online
	5:00 am EDT	Details					
		0	Nepal			2	
		1	Volskaya Industries			2	
		1	Numbani			0	
		1	Rialto			2	

Summer Showdown

Qualifier match 1	July 03	Philadelphia Fusion	3	–	0	Guangzhou Charge	Online
	5:00 am EDT	Details					
		2	Ilios			0	
		3	Watchpoint: Gibraltar			2	
		2	Hanamura			2	
		3	Hollywood			2	

Qualifier match 2	July 04	Philadelphia Fusion	0	–	3	Shanghai Dragons	Online
	6:30 am EDT	Details					
		1	Lijiang Tower			2	
		2	Junkertown			3	
		1	Volskaya Industries			2	

Qualifier match 3	July 09	Chengdu Hunters	3	–	2	Philadelphia Fusion	Online
	6:30 am EDT	Details					
		0	Nepal			2	
		2	Volskaya Industries			3	
		3	King's Row			2	
		3	Junkertown			2	
		2	Busan			0	

Qualifier match 4	July 10	New York Excelsior	3	–	1	Philadelphia Fusion	Online
	5:00 am EDT	Details					
		2	Busan			1	
		2	Temple of Anubis			1	
		2	Eichenwalde			3	
		2	Route 66			1	

Countdown Cup

Qualifier match 1	July 31	Philadelphia Fusion	3	–	0	Shanghai Dragons	Online
	8:00 am EDT	Details					
		2	Busan			0	
		1	Numbani			0	
		2	Rialto			1	

Qualifier match 2	August 01	Hangzhou Spark	1	–	3	Philadelphia Fusion	Online
	8:00 am EDT	Details					
		2	Nepal			1	
		1	Blizzard World			2	
		0	Route 66			3	
		1	Temple of Anubis			2	

Qualifier match 3	August 07	New York Excelsior	1	–	3	Philadelphia Fusion	Online
	5:00 am EDT	Details					
		1	Lijiang Tower			2	
		0	Route 66			3	
		2	Hanamura			1	
		2	Numbani			3	

Qualifier match 4	August 08	Philadelphia Fusion	2	–	3	Seoul Dynasty	Online
	5:00 am EDT	Details					
		2	Oasis			0	
		3	Havana			0	
		2	Volskaya Industries			3	
		2	King's Row			3	
		0	Nepal			2	

Regional finals	August 15	Seoul Dynasty	3	–	1	Philadelphia Fusion	Online
	6:59 am EDT	Details					
		2	Busan			0	
		3	Volskaya Industries			3	
		2	Blizzard World			3	
		1	Rialto			0	
		2	Ilios			1	

2021 season schedule

=== Postseason ===
2021 playoff game log
East Play-ins

Semifinals	September 5	Hangzhou Spark	1	–	3	Philadelphia Fusion	Online
	5:05 am EDT	Details					
		2	Oasis			1	
		2	Volskaya Industries			3	
		1	King's Row			2	
		0	Route 66			1	

Finals	September 5	Philadelphia Fusion	3	–	1	Seoul Dynasty	Online
	7:02 am EDT	Details					
		2	Busan			0	
		0	Hanamura			1	
		6	Numbani			5	
		2	Dorado			1	

Season Playoffs

Upper round 1	September 21	Philadelphia Fusion	1	–	3	Los Angeles Gladiators	Online
	8:30 pm PDT	Details					
		0	Ilios			2	
		2	Temple of Anubis			1	
		2	King's Row			3	
		1	Havana			3	

Lower round 1	September 22	Philadelphia Fusion	2	–	3	San Francisco Shock	Online
	8:30 pm PDT	Details					
		1	Nepal			2	
		3	Volskaya Industries			2	
		3	King's Row			4	
		3	Route 66			2	
		0	Ilios			2	
