= 2021 Guangzhou Charge season =

- Head coach: Lee "Arachne" Ji-won (Released May 6); Sung-woo "Sungwoo" Hong
- Owner: Zhong Naixiong
- Region: East

Results
- Record: 5–11 (.250)
- Place: East: 7th; League: 17th
- May Melee: Did not qualify
- June Joust: Did not qualify
- Summer Showdown: Did not qualify
- Countdown Cup: Did not qualify
- Season Playoffs: Did not qualify
- Total Earnings: $0

The 2021 Guangzhou Charge season was the third season of Guangzhou Charge's existence in the Overwatch League and was their first season under head coach Lee "Arachne" Ji-won. After a poor start to the season, the Charge released head coach Lee "Arachne" Ji-won on May 6 and signed Sung-woo "Sungwoo" Hong as their new head coach on June 17. They finished the season with a 5–11 record and did not qualify any postseason matches for the first time in franchise history.

== Preceding offseason ==
=== Roster changes ===
The Charge entered free agency with seven free agents, four of which became free agents due to the Charge not exercising the option to retain the player for another year.

==== Acquisitions ====
The Charge's first offseason acquisition was Park "KariV" Young-seo, a veteran support player coming off of a struggling year with the Toronto Defiant who signed on November 10, 2020. The next day, they signed Kim "Mandu" Chan-hee, a second-year support player who spent most of the 2020 season on the New York Excelsior's bench. The Charge announced two more signings in the following two days: Zou "MyKaylee" Zijie, a rookie damage player coming from the Hangzhou Spark's Overwatch Contenders academy team Bilibili Gaming, and Choi "ChoiSehwan" Se-hwan, a rookie damage player from Contenders team Element Mystic. The Charge did not sign another player until January 2021; on January 21, they signed Kim "Jihun" Ji-hun, a second-year tank player who did not see much playing time in his rookie season with the London Spitfire.

==== Departures ====
None of the Charge's seven free agents returned, six of which signed with other teams, beginning with support player Kim "Shu" Jin-seo, who signed with the Los Angeles Gladiators on November 9, 2020. Later that month, on November 25, damage player Lee "Happy" Jeong-woo signed with the Houston Outlaws. Five days later, damage player Charlie "Nero" Zwarg signed with the San Francisco Shock. The Charge lost support player Alberto "Neptuno" González Molinillo on December 9 after he signed with the Paris Eternal. Two of the Charge's free agents, damage player Cai "Krystal" Shilong and support player Qi "Wya" Haomiao signed with the Los Angeles Valiant on March 18, 2021. The Charge's final free agent, support player Kim "Chara" Jeong-yeon announced his retirement in the offseason.

=== Organizational changes ===
On October 6, 2020, the Charge released their entire Korean coaching staff, consisting of head coach Cho "J1N" Hyo-jin and assistant coaches Jung "Tydolla" Seung-min and Hong "Sungwoo" Sung-woo. Several weeks later, they signed former San Francisco Shock assistant coach Lee "Arachne" Ji-won as their new head coach for the upcoming season.

== Regular season ==
The Charge began their 2021 season on April 17, playing against the Shanghai Dragons in the May Melee qualifiers. They were swept in their opener 0–3. After a 1–3 record to start the season, the Charge released head coach Lee "Arachne" Ji-won and assistant coach Kim "Daemin" Dae-min on May 6. Three days later, the Charge released assistant coach Park "Neko" Se-hyeon and signed Zheng "Extra" Jiawen as an assistant coach. The Charge signed Sung-woo "Sungwoo" Hong as their new head coach on June 17.

With a 5–11 record, the Charge finished the regular season in second-to-last place in the Eastern region, only ahead of the winless Los Angeles Valiant, marking the first time in franchise history that the team would not qualify for any postseason matches.

== Final roster ==
2021 Guangzhou Charge roster
Players
Coaches

Role	No.	Handle	Name	Nationality
Damage	34	MYKaylee (2W)	Zou Zijie	China
Damage	0	Eileen	Ou Yiliang	China
Damage	13	ChoiSehwan	Choi Se-hwan	South Korea
Tank	14	Rio	Oh Seung-pyo	South Korea
Tank	2	Jihun (2W)	Kim Ji-hun	South Korea
Tank	10	Cr0ng	Nam Ki-cheol	South Korea
Support	2	Mandu	Kim Chan-hee	South Korea
Support	8	KariV	Park Young-seo	South Korea

Head coach

- Vacant

Legend:
- (I) Inactive
- (S) Suspended
- (2W) Two-way player
- Substitute
- (injured) Injury / Illness

Latest roster transaction: January 21, 2021.

== Standings ==
Pos	Team	Pld	W	L	Pts	PCT	MW	ML	MT	MD	Qualification
1	Shanghai Dragons	16	12	4	20	0.750	38	19	2	+19	Advance to season playoffs
2	Chengdu Hunters	16	11	5	15	0.688	38	22	2	+16	Advance to season playoffs
3	Seoul Dynasty	16	12	4	12	0.750	40	22	0	+18	Advance to play-ins
4	Philadelphia Fusion	16	10	6	10	0.625	37	24	3	+13	Advance to play-ins
5	Hangzhou Spark	16	7	9	7	0.438	32	31	0	+1	Advance to play-ins
6	New York Excelsior	16	7	9	7	0.438	29	32	0	−3	
7	Guangzhou Charge	16	5	11	5	0.313	20	38	4	−18	
8	Los Angeles Valiant	16	0	16	0	0.000	2	48	1	−46	

Source: The Overwatch League
Rules for classification: 1) points; 2) winning percentage (including tournaments); 3) regular season wins; 4) regular season map differential

== Game log ==
=== Regular season ===
2021 game log
May Melee

Qualifier match 1	April 17	Guangzhou Charge	0	–	3	Shanghai Dragons	Online
	5:00 pm CST	Details					
		1	Lijang Tower			2	
		3	Blizzard World			3	
		0	Dorado			1	
		0	Temple of Anubis			2	

Qualifier match 2	April 18	Guangzhou Charge	0	–	3	Seoul Dynasty	Online
	5:00 pm CST	Details					
		0	Busan			2	
		3	King'S Row			4	
		2	Havana			3	

Qualifier match 3	April 30	Los Angeles Valiant	0	–	3	Guangzhou Charge	Online
	5:00 pm CST	Details					
		1	Ilios			2	
		0	Hanamura			1	
		1	Eichenwalde			2	

Qualifier match 4	May 01	Guangzhou Charge	0	–	3	Hangzhou Spark	Online
	6:30 pm CST	Details					
		1	Oasis			2	
		1	Temple of Anubis			2	
		2	Blizzard World			3	

June Joust

Qualifier match 1	May 22	Guangzhou Charge	1	–	3	Hangzhou Spark	Online
	5:00 pm CST	Details					
		2	Lijiang Tower			0	
		2	Eichenwalde			3	
		1	Dorado			3	
		3	Temple of Anubis			4	

Qualifier match 2	May 23	New York Excelsior	1	–	3	Guangzhou Charge	Online
	6:30 pm CST	Details					
		1	Nepal			2	
		1	Hollywood			3	
		3	Junkertown			1	
		0	Hanamura			1	

Qualifier match 3	June 04	Guangzhou Charge	0	–	3	Philadelphia Fusion	Hangzhou, CN
	5:00 pm CST	Details					Future Sci-Tech City
		0	Oasis			2	
		3	Hanamura			3	
		1	Hollywood			3	
		1	Junkertown			3	

Qualifier match 4	June 05	Guangzhou Charge	0	–	3	Seoul Dynasty	Hangzhou, CN
	6:30 pm CST	Details					Future Sci-Tech City
		1	Busan			2	
		1	Volskaya Industries			2	
		2	Numbani			3	

Summer Showdown

Qualifier match 1	June 26	Guangzhou Charge	3	–	2	New York Excelsior	Online
	8:00 pm CST	Details					
		2	Lijiang Tower			0	
		2	King's Row			3	
		4	Junkertown			3	
		3	Volskaya Industries			4	
		2	Oasis			1	

Qualifier match 2	June 27	Chengdu Hunters	3	–	0	Guangzhou Charge	Online
	6:30 pm CST	Details					
		2	Busan			1	
		3	Eichenwalde			0	
		3	Route 66			2	

Qualifier match 3	July 03	Philadelphia Fusion	3	–	0	Guangzhou Charge	Online
	5:00 pm CST	Details					
		2	Ilios			0	
		3	Watchpoint: Gibraltar			2	
		2	Hanamura			2	
		3	Hollywood			2	

Qualifier match 4	July 04	Seoul Dynasty	3	–	2	Guangzhou Charge	Online
	5:00 pm CST	Details					
		1	Oasis			2	
		2	Junkertown			3	
		2	Volskaya Industries			1	
		3	King's Row			2	
		2	Nepal			1	

Countdown Cup

Qualifier match 1	August 07	Chengdu Hunters	3	–	1	Guangzhou Charge	Online
	8:00 pm CST	Details					
		2	Oasis			0	
		0	Route 66			1	
		1	Temple of Anubis			1	
		2	Blizzard World			1	
		2	Nepal			0	

Qualifier match 2	August 08	Shanghai Dragons	3	–	1	Guangzhou Charge	Online
	8:00 pm CST	Details					
		2	Lijiang Tower			0	
		3	Havana			0	
		0	Hanamura			1	
		4	Numbani			3	

Qualifier match 3	August 13	Los Angeles Valiant	0	–	3	Guangzhou Charge	Online
	6:30 pm CST	Details					
		1	Nepal			2	
		1	Hanamura			2	
		1	King's Row			2	

Qualifier match 4	August 14	Guangzhou Charge	3	–	2	Hangzhou Spark	Online
	5:00 pm CST	Details					
		2	Ilios			0	
		3	Volskaya Industries			4	
		4	Numbani			5	
		3	Rialto			2	
		2	Lijiang Tower			1	

2021 season schedule
