= 2021 Shanghai Dragons season =

Chinese esports team season

- Overwatch League champions
- East Region champions
- Head coach: Moon Byung-chul
- General manager: Yang Van
- Owner: NetEase
- Region: East

Results
- Record: 12–4 (.750)
- Place: East: 1st; League: 1st
- May Melee: Grand finals
- June Joust: Champions
- Summer Showdown: Champions
- Countdown Cup: Did not qualify
- Season Playoffs: Champions
- Total Earnings: $1,770,000

The 2021 Shanghai Dragons season was the fourth season of the Shanghai Dragons's existence in the Overwatch League and their second under head coach Moon Byung-chul.

== Preceding offseason ==
=== Roster changes ===
Free agents
Position	Handle	Name	2021 team	Date signed	Notes
Damage	Dding	Yang Jin-hyeok	–	–	–
Damage	Diem	Bae Min-sung	Shanghai Dragons	December 2	–
Damage	Diya	Lu Weida	–	–	–
Tank	Geguri	Kim Se-yeon	–	–	–
Support	Luffy	Yang Sung-hyeon	–	–	–
Legend Light green background indicates a player was re-signed by the Dragons. Light red background indicates a player departed from the Dragons.

The Dragons entered free agency with five free agents.

==== Acquisitions ====
The Dragons's first offseason acquisition was Koo "Fate" Pan-seung, a veteran tank player, who was acquired from the Florida Mayhem on November 11, 2020. Six days later, the Dragons signed Jeong "Erster" Jun, a "generally adaptable" damage player who played with the Atlanta Reign in 2020. Shanghai's final acquisition of the offseason was He "Molly" Chengzhi, a support formerly with the Chengdu Hunters who was signed on November 24.

==== Departures ====
Four of the Dragons' five free agents did not return, none of which were signed with other teams, which included damage player Yang "Dding" Jin-hyeok, damage player Lu "Diya" Weida, tank player Kim "Geguri" Se-yeon, and support player Yang "Luffy" Sung-hyeon. Outside of their free agents, the Dragons' first departure was tank player Lee "Fearless" Eui-seok, who was transferred to the Dallas Fuel on November 7. Twenty days later, on November 27, the Dragons released tank player Seo "Stand1" Ji-won.

== Regular season ==
The Dragons' first match of the 2021 season resulted in a win over the Guangzhou Charge in the May Melee qualifiers. After defeating the Philadelphia Fusion in the Eastern regional knockouts, the Dragons entered the May Melee tournament, the first of four midseason double-elimination tournaments in the regular season, as the second-seeded Eastern team. The team fell to the Dallas Fuel in the upper bracket finals, dropping them to the lower bracket of the tournament; the Dragons reached the finals of the tournament through the lower bracket, where they once again lost to the Fuel.

Prior to the start of the June Joust qualifiers, damage player Joon "Erster" Jeong retired. Looking to add depth to their roster, the Dragons signed damage player Lee "WhoRU" Seung-jun several days later. The team won three of their four June Joust qualifying matches to advance them to the regional knockouts. Several days before the knockouts began, the Dragons lost another player to retirement in damage player Bae "Diem" Min-seong; once again looking for depth, the team signed damage player Chae "Develop" Rak-hoon shortly afterwards. The Dragons advanced to the June Joust tournament after defeating the Seoul Dynasty in the regional knockouts. The team lost their first match of the tournament, again to the Fuel; however, after making it to the finals through the lower bracket, the Dragons defeated the Fuel to claim their first title of the 2021 season.

The Dragons continued their success throughout the Summer Showdown, winning all four of their qualifying matches and advancing past the regional qualifiers. Prior to the start of the Summer Showdown tournament, the team added former Dragons player Kim "Daemin" Dae-min as a coach. The Dragons went undefeated in the tournament, and after defeating the Chengdu Hunters in the finals, they claimed their second consecutive midseason tournament title.

In the final tournament cycle of the regular season, the Countdown Cup, the Dragons went 2–2 in the qualifiers, failing to advance to the regional knockouts for the first time in the season; Dragons' head coach Moon "Moon" Byung-chul stated that they were "resting" their players during the tournament cycle. The team finished the regular season with 12 wins, 4 losses, 20 league points, and the top seed in the season playoffs.

Kim "Fleta" Byung-sun, Lee "Lip" Jae-won, and Kim "Izayaki" Min-chul were all MVP candidates for the 2021 regular season. Additionally, Lee "Lip" Jae-won, Kang "Void" Jung-woo, Kim "Izayaki" Min-chul, and Lee "Leejaegon" Jae-gon were awarded Role Star commendations for damage, tank, support, and support, respectively.

== Playoffs ==
Shanghai selected the sixth-seeded San Francisco Shock as their opponent for the first round of the season playoffs; the Dragons swept the Shock, 3–0. The team next defeated the fourth-seeded Los Angeles Gladiators by a score of 3–1. Moving on to the upper bracket finals, the Dragons faced the second-seeded Dallas Fuel, marking the fifth time the two teams had played each other in a midseason or season playoff match in the 2021 season. Despite keeping the maps close, the Dragons came out with a 3–1 victory to advance the Grand Finals bracket.

In the Grand Finals match, the Dragons swept the Reign by a score of 4–0 to win their first OWL championship.

== Final roster ==
2021 Shanghai Dragons roster
Players
Coaches

Role	No.	Handle	Name	Nationality
Damage	70	LIP	Lee Jae-won	South Korea
Damage	1	Fleta	Kim Byung-sun	South Korea
Damage	23	WhoRU	Seung-jun Lee	South Korea
Damage	3	Develop	Chae Rak-hoon	South Korea
Tank	7	Fate	Koo Pan-seung	South Korea
Tank	57	Void	Kang Jun-woo	South Korea
Support	2	LeeJaeGon	Lee Jae-gon	South Korea
Support	22	Izayaki	Kim Min-chul	South Korea
Support	66	Molly	He Chengzhi	China

Head coach

- Moon "Moon" Byung-chul

Legend:
- (I) Inactive
- (S) Suspended
- (2W) Two-way player
- Substitute
- (injured) Injury / Illness

Latest roster transaction: June 10, 2021.

=== Transactions ===
Transactions of/for players on the roster during the 2021 regular season:

- On May 21, damage player Jeong "Erster" Joon retired.
- On May 25, the Dragons signed damage player Lee "WhoRU" Seung-jun.
- On June 3, damage player Bae "diem" Min-seong retired.
- On June 10, the Dragon signed damage player Chae "Develop" Rak-hoon.

== Standings ==
Pos	Team	Pld	W	L	Pts	PCT	MW	ML	MT	MD	Qualification
1	Shanghai Dragons	16	12	4	20	0.750	38	19	2	+19	Advance to season playoffs
2	Chengdu Hunters	16	11	5	15	0.688	38	22	2	+16	Advance to season playoffs
3	Seoul Dynasty	16	12	4	12	0.750	40	22	0	+18	Advance to play-ins
4	Philadelphia Fusion	16	10	6	10	0.625	37	24	3	+13	Advance to play-ins
5	Hangzhou Spark	16	7	9	7	0.438	32	31	0	+1	Advance to play-ins
6	New York Excelsior	16	7	9	7	0.438	29	32	0	−3	
7	Guangzhou Charge	16	5	11	5	0.313	20	38	4	−18	
8	Los Angeles Valiant	16	0	16	0	0.000	2	48	1	−46	

Source: The Overwatch League
Rules for classification: 1) points; 2) winning percentage (including tournaments); 3) regular season wins; 4) regular season map differential

== Game log ==
=== Regular season ===
2021 game log
May Melee

Qualifier match 1	April 17	Guangzhou Charge	0	–	3	Shanghai Dragons	Online
	5:00 pm CST	Details					
		1	Lijang Tower			2	
		3	Blizzard World			3	
		0	Dorado			1	
		0	Temple of Anubis			2	

Qualifier match 2	April 18	Chengdu Hunters	3	–	0	Shanghai Dragons	Online
	6:30 pm CST	Details					
		2	Oasis			0	
		1	Eichenwalde			0	
		4	Watchpoint: Gibraltar			3	

Qualifier match 3	April 30	Shanghai Dragons	3	–	2	Hangzhou Spark	Online
	8:00 pm CST	Details					
		2	Nepal			0	
		2	Volskaya Industries			4	
		0	King's Row			3	
		1	Havana			0	
		2	Busan			0	

Qualifier match 4	May 01	Shanghai Dragons	3	–	0	New York Excelsior	Online
	8:00 pm CST	Details					
		2	Ilios			1	
		2	Temple of Anubis			1	
		3	Blizzard World			1	

Regional finals	May 02	Shanghai Dragons	3	–	2	Philadelphia Fusion	Online
	5:00 pm CST	Details					
		2	Nepal			1	
		2	Volskaya Industries			2	
		1	Eichenwalde			2	
		0	Havana			1	
		2	Ilios			1	
		5	Watchpoint: Gibraltar			4	

Tournament first round	May 07	Shanghai Dragons	3	–	2	Florida Mayhem	Online
	10:00 am CST	Details					
		2	Ilios			0	
		1	Hanamura			1	
		1	King's Row			2	
		1	Watchpoint: Gibraltar			0	
		0	Oasis			2	
		3	Dorado			2	

Upper finals	May 08	Dallas Fuel	3	–	2	Shanghai Dragons	Online
	9:00 am CST	Details					
		2	Ilios			0	
		2	Temple of Anubis			2	
		1	Blizzard World			2	
		3	Watchpoint: Gibraltar			2	
		0	Oasis			2	
		2	Dorado			0	

Lower finals	May 08	Shanghai Dragons	3	–	0	Florida Mayhem	Online
	1:30 pm CST	Details					
		2	Oasis			0	
		1	Hanamura			0	
		2	King's Row			1	

Grand finals	May 09	Shanghai Dragons	2	–	4	Dallas Fuel	Online
	9:00 am CST	Details					
		0	Lijiang Tower			2	
		1	Temple of Anubis			0	
		2	King's Row			3	
		2	Watchpoint: Gibraltar			3	
		2	Ilios			0	
		1	Blizzard World			2	

June Joust

Qualifier match 1	May 22	Shanghai Dragons	3	–	0	Chengdu Hunters	Online
	6:30 pm CST	Details					
		2	Oasis			0	
		2	Hollywood			1	
		6	Junkertown			5	

Qualifier match 2	May 23	Shanghai Dragons	0	–	3	Hangzhou Spark	Online
	5:00 pm CST	Details					
		1	Nepal			2	
		3	Numbani			4	
		0	Rialto			1	

Qualifier match 3	May 29	Shanghai Dragons	3	–	0	Los Angeles Valiant	Online
	5:00 pm CST	Details					
		2	Busan			0	
		3	Rialto			1	
		1	Volskaya Industries			1	
		1	Numbani			0	

Qualifier match 4	May 30	Seoul Dynasty	1	–	3	Shanghai Dragons	Online
	6:30 pm CST	Details					
		1	Lijiang Tower			2	
		1	Dorado			2	
		3	Temple of Anubis			2	
		0	Eichenwalde			3	

Regional finals	June 06	Seoul Dynasty	0	–	3	Shanghai Dragons	Hangzhou, CN
	6:30 pm CST	Details					Future Sci-Tech City
		0	Lijiang Tower			2	
		1	Temple of Anubis			2	
		0	Hollywood			2	

Tournament first round	June 11	Dallas Fuel	3	–	0	Shanghai Dragons	Online
	10:30 am CST	Details					
		2	Busan			0	
		2	Volskaya Industries			1	
		3	Numbani			2	

Lower round 1	June 12	New York Excelsior	0	–	3	Shanghai Dragons	Online
	10:45 am CST	Details					
		0	Busan			2	
		0	Temple of Anubis			2	
		2	Numbani			3	

Lower finals	June 12	Shanghai Dragons	3	–	0	Atlanta Reign	Online
	12:00 noon CST	Details					
		2	Lijiang Tower			1	
		3	Hanamura			2	
		4	Numbani			3	

Grand finals	June 13	Shanghai Dragons	4	–	3	Dallas Fuel	Online
	9:00 am CST	Details					
		0	Lijiang Tower			2	
		0	Volskaya Industries			2	
		2	Numbani			1	
		3	Rialto			4	
		2	Busan			1	
		3	Eichenwalde			2	
		2	Junkertown			1	

Summer Showdown

Qualifier match 1	July 03	Seoul Dynasty	0	–	3	Shanghai Dragons	Online
	6:30 pm CST	Details					
		0	Busan			2	
		0	Route 66			1	
		1	Temple of Anubis			2	

Qualifier match 2	July 04	Philadelphia Fusion	0	–	3	Shanghai Dragons	Online
	6:30 pm CST	Details					
		1	Lijiang Tower			2	
		2	Junkertown			3	
		1	Volskaya Industries			2	

Qualifier match 3	July 09	Los Angeles Valiant	0	–	3	Shanghai Dragons	Shanghai, CN
	8:00 pm CST	Details					Jing'An Sports Center
		1	Nepal			2	
		0	Volskaya Industries			1	
		2	King's Row			3	

Qualifier match 4	July 10	Hangzhou Spark	1	–	3	Shanghai Dragons	Shanghai, CN
	8:00 pm CST	Details					Jing'An Sports Center
		0	Ilios			2	
		1	Hanamura			2	
		2	Hollywood			1	
		1	Watchpoint: Gibraltar			2	

Regional finals	July 11	New York Excelsior	0	–	3	Shanghai Dragons	Shanghai, CN
	5:12 pm CST	Details					Jing'An Sports Center
		0	Ilios			2	
		2	Volskaya Industries			3	
		4	King's Row			5	

Tournament first round	July 16	Atlanta Reign	0	–	3	Shanghai Dragons	Online
	11:00 am CST	Details					
		0	Nepal			2	
		1	Hanamura			2	
		0	King's Row			3	

Upper finals	July 17	Chengdu Hunters	2	–	3	Shanghai Dragons	Online
	9:00 am CST	Details					
		1	Ilios			2	
		1	Temple of Anubis			2	
		4	Eichenwalde			3	
		3	Watchpoint: Gibraltar			2	
		0	Busan			2	

Grand finals	July 18	Chengdu Hunters	1	–	4	Shanghai Dragons	Online
	9:00 am CST	Details					
		2	Ilios			0	
		1	Temple of Anubis			2	
		1	Eichenwalde			3	
		2	Route 66			3	
		0	Nepal			2	

Countdown Cup

Qualifier match 1	July 31	Philadelphia Fusion	3	–	0	Shanghai Dragons	Online
	8:00 pm CST	Details					
		2	Busan			0	
		1	Numbani			0	
		2	Rialto			1	

Qualifier match 2	August 01	Shanghai Dragons	2	–	3	New York Excelsior	Online
	6:30 pm CST	Details					
		1	Ilios			2	
		3	King's Row			2	
		1	Havana			2	
		3	Volskaya Industries			2	
		1	Lijiang Tower			2	

Qualifier match 3	August 07	Seoul Dynasty	2	–	3	Shanghai Dragons	Online
	6:30 pm CST	Details					
		2	Nepal			0	
		2	Route 66			3	
		2	Temple of Anubis			0	
		1	Blizzard World			2	
		0	Busan			2	

Qualifier match 4	August 08	Shanghai Dragons	3	–	1	Guangzhou Charge	Online
	8:00 pm CST	Details					
		2	Lijiang Tower			0	
		3	Havana			0	
		0	Hanamura			1	
		4	Numbani			3	

2021 season schedule

=== Postseason ===
2021 playoff game log
Season Playoffs

Upper round 1	September 22	San Francisco Shock	0	–	3	Shanghai Dragons	Online
	10:00 am CST	Details					
		1	Ilios			2	
		0	Hanamura			1	
		2	King's Row			3	

Upper round 2	September 23	Los Angeles Gladiators	1	–	3	Shanghai Dragons	Online
	1:30 pm CST	Details					
		0	Ilios			2	
		2	Hanamura			0	
		0	Numbani			1	
		0	Havana			1	

Upper final	September 23	Dallas Fuel	1	–	3	Shanghai Dragons	Online
	10:30 am CST	Details					
		0	Ilios			2	
		3	Volskaya Industries			2	
		2	Numbani			3	
		1	Dorado			3	

Grand Finals	September 25	Atlanta Reign	0	–	4	Shanghai Dragons	Online
	9:00 am CST	Details					
		0	Ilios			2	
		2	Hanamura			3	
		5	King's Row			6	
		2	Havana			3	
