= 2021 Chengdu Hunters season =

Overwatch League team season

- Head coach: Wang "RUI" Xingrui
- Owner: Huya
- Region: East

Results
- Record: 11–5 (.688)
- Place: East: 2nd; League: 3rd
- May Melee: Lower round 1
- June Joust: Did not qualify
- Summer Showdown: Grand finals
- Countdown Cup: Grand finals
- Season Playoffs: Lower round 2
- Total Earnings: $310,000

The 2021 Chengdu Hunters season was the third season of Chengdu Hunters's existence in the Overwatch League and the team's second season under head coach Wang "RUI" Xingrui, after he was the head coach of the team in 2019. The team qualified for three of the four midseason tournaments, reaching the finals twice, but failed to secure a title in any of them. For the first time in franchise history, the team qualified for the season playoffs. However, a loss to the San Francisco Shock in the lower bracket ended their playoff run. Damage player Huang "Leave" Xin won the season's Most Valuable Player award.

== Preceding offseason ==
=== Organizational changes ===
In mid-September 2020, the Hunters released assistant coach Guan "Garry" Li and co-head coaches Murong "Chen" Chen and Chang "Ray" Chia-Hua. The team signed Wang "RUI" Xingrui as their new head coach. Wang was previously the team's head coach in the 2019 season, before he left the team due to health issues.

=== Roster changes ===
The Hunters entered free agency with three free agents, all of which became free agents due to the Hunters not exercising the option to retain the player for another year.

==== Acquisitions ====
The Hunters' first offseason acquisitions were Lei "Jimmy" Yujia, a rookie damage player coming from Guangzhou Charge's Overwatch Contenders academy team Ultra Prime Academy, and Lui "Kaneki" Nian, a rookie damage player who most recently played for Team Cat in Contenders, both of whom signed on November 19. Three days later, they signed Tan "Nisha" Li, a rookie support player who formerly played for Contenders team Bilibili Gaming. The Hunters signed two more rookie players on November 27: tank player Qui "GA9A" Jiaxin and support player Cao "Faraway1987" Jiale, both of whom came from Shanghai Dragons' academy team Team CC. The Hunters' final acquisition of the offseason was Zhou "Mmonk" Xiang, a rookie support player promoted from their academy team Team Chaser on March 25, 2021.

==== Departures ====
The Hunters' first departure was on October 15, 2020, with the release of damage player Lo "Baconjack" Tzu-heng and tank player Chen "Ating" Shao-hua. None of the Hunters' three free agents returned, all of which signed with other teams, beginning with support players Kong "Kyo" Chunting and Chen "Lengsa" Jinyi, both of whom were sent to the Hunters' academy team Team Chaser on November 17. One week later, support player He "Molly" Chengzhi was signed by the Shanghai Dragons.

== Regular season ==
The Hunters began their 2021 season on April 17 with a win over the Los Angeles Valiant 3–1 in the May Melee qualifiers. Chengdu finished the qualifiers with a 3–1 record and advanced to the regional knockouts. After defeating the Seoul Dynasty in the knockouts, the Hunters advanced to the interregional tournament bracket. The team's first match in the double-elimination tournament was against the Dallas Fuel; they lost the match, 1–3, sending them to the lower bracket. In the first round of the lower bracket, Chengdu lost to the Florida Mayhem, 1–3, eliminating them from the tournament.

The Hunters performed poorly in the second tournament cycle, dropping in the regular season standings to fifth out of eighth place in the Eastern Division. Prior the beginning of the third midseason tournament qualifiers, the Summer Showdown, the Hunters sent damage player Liu "Kaneki" Nian back down to their academy team Team Chaser. In his replacement, Chengdu promoted damage player Zhong "TAROCOOK1E" Yunlong from Team Chaser. After the first week of the Summer Showdown qualifiers, tank player Luo "Elsa" Wenjie, who had been with the team since their inception, retired. The team advanced past the qualifiers and regional knockouts, giving them their second tournament appearance of the season. In the first round, on July 15, the Hunters defeated the Dallas Fuel, 3–1. After a loss to the Shanghai Dragons and win over the Dallas Fuel, again, the Hunters advanced to the tournament finals, where they again faced the Dragons. Despite winning the first map of the series, the Hunters lost the following four, losing the finals match 1–4.

In the final midseason tournament cycle of the season, the Countdown Cup, the Hunters again advanced past the qualifiers and regional knockouts, securing their third tournament appearance. The team once again made it to the finals, for the second consecutive time, where they faced the Los Angeles Gladiators. After a seven-map series, the Hunters lost the match by a 3–4 scoreline. The team finished the regular season with 11 wins, 5 losses, 15 league points, and the third seed in the season playoffs.

Damage player Huang "Leave" Xin was awarded a Role Star commendation and named season's Most Valuable Player.

== Playoffs ==
In the first round of the 2021 season playoffs, the Hunters faced the fifth-seeded Atlanta Reign; Chengdu won the match 3–2. However, the following day, the Hunters lost against the Dallas Fuel by a 0–3 scoreline, sending them to the lower bracket. Facing elimination, the Hunters faced the San Francisco Shock the following day; the Hunters lost in a five-map series, 2–3, ending their playoff run.

== Final roster ==
2021 Chengdu Hunters roster
Players
Coaches

Role	No.	Handle	Name	Nationality
Damage	23	leave	Huang Xin	China
Damage	9	Jimmy	Lei Yuija	China
Damage	24	JinMu	Yi Hu	China
Damage	21	TAROCOOK1E	Zhong Yunlong	China
Tank	5	Ameng	Ding Menghan	China
Tank	46	GA9A	Qiu Jiaxin	China
Tank	64	LateYoung (TW)	Ma Tianban	China
Support	10	Nisha	Tan Li	China
Support	29	Yveltal (TW)	Li Xianyao	China
Support	87	Farway1987	Cao Jiale	China
Support	89	Mmonk	Zhou Xiang	China

Head coach

- Wang "RUI" Xingrui

Legend:
- (I) Inactive
- (S) Suspended
- (2W) Two-way player
- Substitute
- (injured) Injury / Illness

Latest roster transaction: July 1, 2021.

=== Transactions ===
Transactions of/for players on the roster during the 2021 regular season:

- On June 17, Hunters released damage player Liu "Kaneki" Nian and signed damage player Zhong "TAROCOOK1E" Yunlong.
- On July 1, tank player Luo "Elsa" Wenjie retired.

== Standings ==
Pos	Team	Pld	W	L	Pts	PCT	MW	ML	MT	MD	Qualification
1	Shanghai Dragons	16	12	4	20	0.750	38	19	2	+19	Advance to season playoffs
2	Chengdu Hunters	16	11	5	15	0.688	38	22	2	+16	Advance to season playoffs
3	Seoul Dynasty	16	12	4	12	0.750	40	22	0	+18	Advance to play-ins
4	Philadelphia Fusion	16	10	6	10	0.625	37	24	3	+13	Advance to play-ins
5	Hangzhou Spark	16	7	9	7	0.438	32	31	0	+1	Advance to play-ins
6	New York Excelsior	16	7	9	7	0.438	29	32	0	−3	
7	Guangzhou Charge	16	5	11	5	0.313	20	38	4	−18	
8	Los Angeles Valiant	16	0	16	0	0.000	2	48	1	−46	

Source: The Overwatch League
Rules for classification: 1) points; 2) winning percentage (including tournaments); 3) regular season wins; 4) regular season map differential

== Game log ==
=== Regular season ===
2021 game log
May Melee

Qualifier match 1	April 17	Los Angeles Valiant	1	–	3	Chengdu Hunters	Online
	6:30 pm CST	Details					
		0	Lijiang Tower			2	
		3	King's Row			2	
		0	Havana			3	
		1	Volskaya Industries			2	

Qualifier match 2	April 18	Chengdu Hunters	3	–	0	Shanghai Dragons	Online
	6:30 pm CST	Details					
		2	Oasis			0	
		1	Eichenwalde			0	
		4	Watchpoint: Gibraltar			3	

Qualifier match 3	April 24	Chengdu Hunters	3	–	0	New York Excelsior	Online
	5:00 pm CST	Details					
		2	Nepal			0	
		1	Dorado			0	
		2	Temple of Anubis			0	

Qualifier match 4	April 25	Chengdu Hunters	1	–	3	Philadelphia Fusion	Online
	6:30 pm CST	Details					
		1	Ilios			2	
		0	Havana			1	
		3	Volskaya Industries			2	
		2	King's Row			3	

Regional finals	May 02	Chengdu Hunters	3	–	1	Seoul Dynasty	Online
	6:30 pm CST	Details					
		2	Busan			1	
		2	Hanamura			1	
		0	Blizzard World			1	
		3	Watchpoint: Gibraltar			2	

Tournament first round	May 07	Dallas Fuel	3	–	1	Chengdu Hunters	Online
	11:30 am CST	Details					
		2	Nepal			1	
		2	Temple of Anubis			1	
		0	Blizzard World			1	
		4	Watchpoint: Gibraltar			3	

Lower round 1	May 08	Florida Mayhem	3	–	1	Chengdu Hunters	Online
	10:30 am CST	Details					
		2	Lijiang Tower			1	
		2	Volskaya Industries			1	
		2	Blizzard World			3	
		4	Havana			3	

June Joust

Qualifier match 1	May 22	Shanghai Dragons	3	–	0	Chengdu Hunters	Online
	6:30 pm CST	Details					
		2	Oasis			0	
		2	Hollywood			1	
		6	Junkertown			5	

Qualifier match 2	May 23	Philadelphia Fusion	1	–	3	Chengdu Hunters	Online
	8:00 pm CST	Details					
		0	Busan			2	
		1	Eichenwalde			2	
		2	Dorado			1	
		1	Temple of Anubis			1	
		0	Ilios			2	

Qualifier match 3	June 04	Chengdu Hunters	2	–	3	Seoul Dynasty	Hangzhou, CN
	6:30 pm CST	Details					Future Sci-Tech City
		0	Nepal			2	
		1	Temple of Anubis			2	
		3	Eichenwalde			2	
		2	Dorado			1	
		1	Busan			2	

Qualifier match 4	June 05	Chengdu Hunters	1	–	3	Hangzhou Spark	Hangzhou, CN
	8:00 pm CST	Details					Future Sci-Tech City
		1	Ilios			2	
		3	Volskaya Industries			2	
		3	Numbani			5	
		2	Rialto			3	

Summer Showdown

Qualifier match 1	June 26	Seoul Dynasty	3	–	1	Chengdu Hunters	Online
	6:30 pm CST	Details					
		2	Ilios			0	
		3	Hollywood			2	
		0	Watchpoint: Gibraltar			1	
		2	Hanamura			1	

Qualifier match 2	June 27	Chengdu Hunters	3	–	0	Guangzhou Charge	Online
	6:30 pm CST	Details					
		2	Busan			1	
		3	Eichenwalde			0	
		3	Route 66			2	

Qualifier match 3	July 09	Chengdu Hunters	3	–	2	Philadelphia Fusion	Shanghai, CN
	6:30 pm CST	Details					Jing'An Sports Center
		0	Nepal			2	
		2	Volskaya Industries			3	
		3	King's Row			2	
		3	Junkertown			2	
		2	Busan			0	

Qualifier match 4	July 10	Los Angeles Valiant	0	–	3	Chengdu Hunters	Shanghai, CN
	6:30 pm CST	Details					Jing'An Sports Center
		0	Oasis			2	
		1	Temple of Anubis			2	
		0	Eichenwalde			1	

Regional finals	July 11	Seoul Dynasty	2	–	3	Chengdu Hunters	Shanghai, CN
	6:52 pm CST	Details					Jing'An Sports Center
		2	Busan			1	
		1	Temple of Anubis			2	
		0	Eichenwalde			3	
		1	Junkertown			0	
		1	Nepal			2	

Tournament first round	July 16	Chengdu Hunters	3	–	1	Dallas Fuel	Online
	9:00 am CST	Details					
		1	Lijiang Tower			2	
		4	Volskaya Industries			3	
		3	King's Row			2	
		3	Watchpoint: Gibraltar			1	

Upper finals	July 17	Chengdu Hunters	2	–	3	Shanghai Dragons	Online
	9:00 am CST	Details					
		1	Ilios			2	
		1	Temple of Anubis			2	
		4	Eichenwalde			3	
		3	Watchpoint: Gibraltar			2	
		0	Busan			2	

Lower finals	July 17	Chengdu Hunters	3	–	0	Dallas Fuel	Online
	1:35 pm CST	Details					
		2	Lijiang Tower			0	
		3	Temple of Anubis			2	
		2	King's Row			1	

Grand finals	July 18	Chengdu Hunters	1	–	4	Shanghai Dragons	Online
	9:00 am CST	Details					
		2	Ilios			0	
		1	Temple of Anubis			2	
		1	Eichenwalde			3	
		2	Route 66			3	
		0	Nepal			2	

Countdown Cup

Qualifier match 1	August 07	Chengdu Hunters	3	–	1	Guangzhou Charge	Online
	8:00 pm CST	Details					
		2	Oasis			0	
		0	Route 66			1	
		1	Temple of Anubis			1	
		2	Blizzard World			1	
		2	Nepal			0	

Qualifier match 2	August 08	Chengdu Hunters	3	–	1	New York Excelsior	Online
	6:30 pm CST	Details					
		0	Nepal			2	
		3	Rialto			1	
		2	Volskaya Industries			1	
		3	King's Row			1	

Qualifier match 3	August 13	Hangzhou Spark	1	–	3	Chengdu Hunters	Online
	5:00 pm CST	Details					
		0	Busan			2	
		2	Hanamura			1	
		3	King's Row			4	
		1	Havana			2	

Qualifier match 4	August 14	Los Angeles Valiant	0	–	3	Chengdu Hunters	Online
	6:30 pm CST	Details					
		0	Lijiang Tower			2	
		1	Volskaya Industries			2	
		0	Numbani			3	

Regional finals	August 15	New York Excelsior	1	–	3	Chengdu Hunters	Online
	5:05 pm CST	Details					
		0	Ilios			2	
		4	Hanamura			3	
		4	King's Row			5	
		2	Havana			3	

Tournament first round	August 20	Los Angeles Gladiators	3	–	2	Chengdu Hunters	Online
	10:30 am CST	Details					
		0	Ilios			2	
		2	Temple of Anubis			1	
		3	King's Row			2	
		0	Route 66			1	
		2	Oasis			0	

Lower round 1	August 21	Seoul Dynasty	0	–	3	Chengdu Hunters	Online
	10:30 am CST	Details					
		1	Ilios			2	
		1	Temple of Anubis			2	
		0	Blizzard World			1	

Lower finals	August 21	Atlanta Reign	0	–	3	Chengdu Hunters	Online
	12:00 noon CST	Details					
		1	Ilios			2	
		1	Hanamura			2	
		1	Blizzard World			2	

Grand finals	August 22	Chengdu Hunters	3	–	4	Los Angeles Gladiators	Online
	9:00 am CST	Details					
		2	Oasis			0	
		0	Temple of Anubis			1	
		2	Numbani			3	
		2	Route 66			3	
		2	Ilios			0	
		3	King's Row			2	
		1	Havana			2	

2021 season schedule

=== Postseason ===
2021 playoff game log
Season Playoffs

Upper round 1	September 22	Atlanta Reign	2	–	3	Chengdu Hunters	Online
	1:30 pm CST	Details					
		2	Nepal			0	
		3	Temple of Anubis			4	
		4	King's Row			3	
		2	Dorado			3	
		0	Oasis			2	

Upper round 2	September 23	Chengdu Hunters	0	–	3	Dallas Fuel	Online
	10:00 am CST	Details					
		0	Lijiang Tower			2	
		2	Volskaya Industries			3	
		0	Eichenwalde			3	

Lower round 2	September 24	San Francisco Shock	3	–	2	Chengdu Hunters	Online
	9:00 am CST	Details					
		2	Lijiang Tower			0	
		3	Temple of Anubis			3	
		4	King's Row			3	
		2	Dorado			3	
		0	Ilios			2	
		2	Havana			0	
