= 2021 Seoul Dynasty season =

Overwatch League season

- Head coach: Park Chang-geun
- Owner: Kevin Chou
- Region: East

Results
- Record: 12–4 (.750)
- Place: East: 3rd; League: 7th
- May Melee: Regional finals
- June Joust: Regional finals
- Summer Showdown: Regional finals
- Countdown Cup: Lower round 1
- Season Playoffs: Did not qualify
- Total Earnings: $20,000

The 2021 Seoul Dynasty season will be the fourth season of the Seoul Dynasty's existence in the Overwatch League and the team's second under head coach Park "Changgoon" Chang-geun.

== Preceding offseason ==
=== Roster changes ===
Free agents
Position	Handle	Name	2021 team	Date signed	Notes
Support	Bdosin	Choi Seung-tae	–	–	Option declined
Damage	Illicit	Park Je-min	Team BM (OWC)	January 20	Option declined
Tank	Michelle	Choi Min-hyuk	Toronto Defiant	November 24	Option declined
Support	Slime	Kim Seong-jun	Florida Mayhem	December 11	–
Support	Tobi	Yang Jin-mo	Philadelphia Fusion	April 8	Option declined
Tank	Toyou	Lim Hyeon-woo	Seoul Dynasty	January 6	Option declined
Legend Light green background indicates a player was re-signed by the Dynasty. Light red background indicates a player departed from the Dynasty.

The Dynasty entered free agency with six free agents, five of which became free agents due to the team not exercising the option to retain the player for another year.

==== Acquisitions ====
The Dynasty's first and only offseason acquisitions were Park "Saebyeolbe" Jong-ryeol, a veteran damage player and former team captain of the New York Excelsior, and Jung "Anamo" Tae-sung, a veteran support player described as "steadfast and cautious" also coming from the Excelior, both of whom were signed on November 29, 2020.

==== Departures ====
Six of the Dynasty's seven free agents did not return, five of which signed with other teams, beginning with tank player Choi "Michelle" Min-hyuk, who signed with the Toronto Defiant on November 24, 2020. The Dynasty lost support player Kim "Slime" Seong-jun to the Florida Mayhem on December 11. On January 20, 2021, damage player Park "Illicit" Je-min signed with Overwatch Contenders team Team BM. Three months later, on April 8, Support player Yang "Tobi" Jin-mo signed with the Philadelphia Fusion. Additionally, support player Choi "Bdosin" Seung-tae announced his retirement in the offseason.

== Regular season ==
=== May Melee ===
The Dynasty began their 2021 season on April 17 with a 1–3 loss to the Philadelphia Fusion in the May Melee qualifiers. In their following match, they swept the Guangzhou Charge 3–0.

== Final roster ==
2021 Seoul Dynasty roster
Players
Coaches

Role	No.	Handle	Name	Nationality
Damage	1	FITS	Kim Dong-eun	South Korea
Damage	56	Saebyeolbe	Park Jong-ryeol	South Korea
Damage	13	Profit	Park Joon-yeong	South Korea
Tank	7	Gesture	Hong Jae-hee	South Korea
Tank	11	Marve1	Hwang Min-seo	South Korea
Tank	6	Toyou	Lim Hyun-woo	South Korea
Support	2	Anamo	Jung Tae-sung	South Korea
Support	20	Creative	Kim Young-wan	South Korea

Head coach

- Park "changoon" Chang-geun

Legend:
- (I) Inactive
- (S) Suspended
- (2W) Two-way player
- Substitute
- (injured) Injury / Illness

Latest roster transaction: January 6, 2021.

== Standings ==
Pos	Team	Pld	W	L	Pts	PCT	MW	ML	MT	MD	Qualification
1	Shanghai Dragons	16	12	4	20	0.750	38	19	2	+19	Advance to season playoffs
2	Chengdu Hunters	16	11	5	15	0.688	38	22	2	+16	Advance to season playoffs
3	Seoul Dynasty	16	12	4	12	0.750	40	22	0	+18	Advance to play-ins
4	Philadelphia Fusion	16	10	6	10	0.625	37	24	3	+13	Advance to play-ins
5	Hangzhou Spark	16	7	9	7	0.438	32	31	0	+1	Advance to play-ins
6	New York Excelsior	16	7	9	7	0.438	29	32	0	−3	
7	Guangzhou Charge	16	5	11	5	0.313	20	38	4	−18	
8	Los Angeles Valiant	16	0	16	0	0.000	2	48	1	−46	

Source: The Overwatch League
Rules for classification: 1) points; 2) winning percentage (including tournaments); 3) regular season wins; 4) regular season map differential

== Game log ==
=== Regular season ===
2021 game log
May Melee

Qualifier match 1	April 17	Philadelphia Fusion	3	–	1	Seoul Dynasty	Online
	9:00 pm KST	Details					
		2	Oasis			1	
		4	Blizzard World			3	
		2	Dorado			3	
		3	Temple of Anubis			2	

Qualifier match 2	April 18	Guangzhou Charge	0	–	3	Seoul Dynasty	Online
	6:00 pm KST	Details					
		0	Busan			2	
		3	King's Row			4	
		2	Havana			3	

Qualifier match 3	April 30	Seoul Dynasty	3	–	0	New York Excelsior	Online
	7:30 pm KST	Details					
		2	Lijiang Tower			0	
		2	Hanamura			1	
		3	Eichenwalde			2	

Qualifier match 4	May 01	Seoul Dynasty	3	–	0	Los Angeles Valiant	Online
	6:00 pm KST	Details					
		2	Nepal			0	
		2	Temple of Anubis			1	
		3	Blizzard World			1	

Regional finals	May 02	Chengdu Hunters	3	–	1	Seoul Dynasty	Online
	7:30 pm KST	Details					
		2	Busan			1	
		2	Hanamura			1	
		0	Blizzard World			1	
		3	Watchpoint: Gibraltar			2	

June Joust

Qualifier match 1	May 29	New York Excelsior	1	–	3	Seoul Dynasty	Online
	7:30 pm KST	Details					
		1	Oasis			2	
		3	Junkertown			2	
		0	Hanamura			1	
		3	Hollywood			4	

Qualifier match 2	May 30	Seoul Dynasty	1	–	3	Shanghai Dragons	Online
	7:30 pm KST	Details					
		1	Lijiang Tower			2	
		1	Dorado			2	
		3	Temple of Anubis			2	
		0	Eichenwalde			3	

Qualifier match 3	June 04	Chengdu Hunters	2	–	3	Seoul Dynasty	Online
	7:30 pm KST	Details					
		0	Nepal			2	
		1	Temple of Anubis			2	
		3	Eichenwalde			2	
		2	Dorado			1	
		1	Busan			2	

Qualifier match 4	June 05	Guangzhou Charge	0	–	3	Seoul Dynasty	Online
	7:30 pm KST	Details					
		1	Busan			2	
		1	Volskaya Industries			2	
		2	Numbani			3	

Regional finals	June 06	Seoul Dynasty	0	–	3	Shanghai Dragons	Online
	7:30 pm KST	Details					
		0	Lijiang Tower			2	
		1	Temple of Anubis			2	
		0	Hollywood			2	

Summer Showdown

Qualifier match 1	June 26	Seoul Dynasty	3	–	1	Chengdu Hunters	Online
	7:30 pm KST	Details					
		2	Ilios			0	
		3	Hollywood			2	
		0	Watchpoint: Gibraltar			1	
		2	Hanamura			1	

Qualifier match 2	June 27	Hangzhou Spark	0	–	3	Seoul Dynasty	Online
	6:00 pm KST	Details					
		1	Nepal			2	
		3	King's Row			4	
		2	Junkertown			3	

Qualifier match 3	July 03	Seoul Dynasty	0	–	3	Shanghai Dragons	Online
	7:30 pm KST	Details					
		0	Busan			2	
		0	Route 66			1	
		1	Temple of Anubis			2	

Qualifier match 4	July 04	Seoul Dynasty	3	–	2	Guangzhou Charge	Online
	6:00 pm KST	Details					
		1	Oasis			2	
		2	Junkertown			3	
		2	Volskaya Industries			1	
		3	King's Row			2	
		2	Nepal			1	

Regional finals	July 11	Seoul Dynasty	2	–	3	Chengdu Hunters	Online
	7:52 pm KST	Details					
		2	Busan			1	
		1	Temple of Anubis			2	
		0	Eichenwalde			3	
		1	Junkertown			0	
		1	Nepal			2	

Countdown Cup

Qualifier match 1	July 31	Hangzhou Spark	2	–	3	Seoul Dynasty	Online
	6:00 pm KST	Details					
		2	Lijiang Tower			0	
		3	King's Row			2	
		0	Rialto			3	
		2	Volskaya Industries			3	
		1	Oasis			2	

Qualifier match 2	August 01	Seoul Dynasty	3	–	0	Los Angeles Valiant	Online
	6:00 pm KST	Details					
		2	Ilios			0	
		1	Numbani			0	
		3	Havana			2	

Qualifier match 3	August 07	Seoul Dynasty	2	–	3	Shanghai Dragons	Online
	7:30 pm KST	Details					
		2	Nepal			0	
		2	Route 66			3	
		2	Temple of Anubis			0	
		1	Blizzard World			2	
		0	Busan			2	

Qualifier match 4	August 08	Philadelphia Fusion	2	–	3	Seoul Dynasty	Online
	6:00 pm KST	Details					
		2	Oasis			0	
		3	Havana			0	
		2	Volskaya Industries			3	
		2	King's Row			3	
		0	Nepal			2	

Regional finals	August 15	Seoul Dynasty	3	–	1	Philadelphia Fusion	Online
	7:59 pm KST	Details					
		2	Busan			0	
		3	Volskaya Industries			3	
		2	Blizzard World			3	
		1	Rialto			0	
		2	Ilios			1	

Tournament first round	August 20	Seoul Dynasty	1	–	3	Atlanta Reign	Online
	10:00 am KST	Details					
		2	Busan			0	
		2	Hanamura			3	
		4	Numbani			5	
		1	Route 66			3	

Lower round 1	August 21	Seoul Dynasty	0	–	3	Chengdu Hunters	Online
	11:30 am KST	Details					
		1	Ilios			2	
		1	Temple of Anubis			2	
		0	Blizzard World			1	

2021 season schedule

=== Postseason ===
2021 playoff game log
East Play-ins

Finals	September 5	Philadelphia Fusion	3	–	1	Seoul Dynasty	Online
	8:02 pm KST	Details					
		2	Busan			0	
		0	Hanamura			1	
		6	Numbani			5	
		2	Dorado			1	
