= 2021 New York Excelsior season =

- Head coach: Lee "WhyNot" Ju-hyeop
- General manager: Kim Yo-han
- Owner: Jeff Wilpon
- Region: East

Results
- Record: 7–9 (.438)
- Place: East: 6th; League: 14th
- May Melee: Did not qualify
- June Joust: Lower round 1
- Summer Showdown: Regional finals
- Countdown Cup: Did not qualify
- Season Playoffs: Did not qualify
- Total Earnings: $20,000

The 2021 New York Excelsior season will be the fourth season of New York Excelsior's (NYXL) existence in the Overwatch League and their first under head coach Lee "WhyNot" Ju-hyeop.

== Preceding offseason ==
=== Roster changes ===
Free agents
Position	Handle	Name	2021 team	Date signed	Notes
Support	Anamo	Jung Tae-sung	Seoul Dynasty	November 29	Option declined
Tank	Bianca	Kim Dong-wook	New York Excelsior	December 11	Option declined
Damage	Haksal	Kim Hyo-jong	–	–	Option declined
Damage	Libero	Kim Hae-seong	–	–	Option declined
Tank	Mano	Kim Dong-gyu	Philadelphia Fusion	November 2	Option declined
Damage	Saebyeolbe	Park Jong-ryeol	Seoul Dynasty	November 29	Option declined
Damage	WhoRU	Lee Seung-jun	–	–	Option declined
Legend Light green background indicates a player was re-signed by the Excelsior. Light red background indicates a player departed from the Excelsior.

The NYXL entered free agency with seven free agents, all of which became free agents due to the team not exercising the option to retain the player for another year.

==== Acquisitions ====
The Excelsior's first offseason acquisition was Jo "Yakpung" Gyeong-mu, a tank player coming off of an Overwatch Contenders Korea championship with O2 Blast who signed on December 11, 2020. Six days later, they signed rookie Lee "Friday" Seung-woo, a "skilled and flexible" support player coming from Contenders team OZ Gaming. On December 22, the team announced the signing of four damage players: Jo "FEATH5R" Min-jae, a rookie coming from OZ Gaming, Lim "Flora" Young-woo, a rookie hitscan player coming from Contenders team Team Diamond, Kim "Gwangboong" Gwang-won, another rookie hitscan player coming from Contenders team Team Cat, and Lee "Ivy" Seung-hyun, a veteran who was "one of the most flexible and deadly" damage players with the Philadelphia Fusion in 2020.

==== Departures ====
The Excelsior released two of their contracted players on October 22, 2020: damage player Jeong "Nenne" Yeon-gwan and tank player Choi "Hotba" Hong-jun. Six of the NYXL's seven free agents did not return, three of which signed with other teams, beginning with tank player Kim "Mano" Dong-gyu signing with the Philadelphia Fusion on November 2. On November 29, support player Jung "Anamo" Tae-sung and tank player Park "Saebyeolbe" Jong-ryeol signed with the Seoul Dynasty. Damage players Kim "Haksal" Hyo-jong and Lee "WhoRU" Seung-jun both announced their retirements in the offseason. The team's final free agent, damage player Kim "Libero" Hae-seong did not sign with a team in the offseason.

== Final roster ==
2021 New York Excelsior roster
Players
Coaches

Role	No.	Handle	Name	Nationality
Damage	14	FEATH5R	Jo Min-jae	South Korea
Damage	12	Flora	Lim Young-woo	South Korea
Damage	83	Gwangboong	Kim Gwang-won	South Korea
Tank	29	Yakpung	Jo Gyeong-mu	South Korea
Tank	13	BiaNcA	Kim Dong-wook	South Korea
Tank	5	Kalios	Wooyeol Shin	South Korea
Support	1	Friday	Jo Min-jae	South Korea
Support	44	JJonak	Bang Seong-hyun	South Korea

Head coach

- Lee "WhyNot" Ju-hyeop

Legend:
- (I) Inactive
- (S) Suspended
- (2W) Two-way player
- Substitute
- (injured) Injury / Illness

Latest roster transaction: July 16, 2021.

=== Transactions ===
Transactions of/for players on the roster during the 2021 regular season:

- On June 30, the Excelsior signed tank player Shin "Kalios" Woo-yeol.
- On July 16, damage player Lee "Ivy" Seung-hyun retired.

== Standings ==
Pos	Team	Pld	W	L	Pts	PCT	MW	ML	MT	MD	Qualification
1	Shanghai Dragons	16	12	4	20	0.750	38	19	2	+19	Advance to season playoffs
2	Chengdu Hunters	16	11	5	15	0.688	38	22	2	+16	Advance to season playoffs
3	Seoul Dynasty	16	12	4	12	0.750	40	22	0	+18	Advance to play-ins
4	Philadelphia Fusion	16	10	6	10	0.625	37	24	3	+13	Advance to play-ins
5	Hangzhou Spark	16	7	9	7	0.438	32	31	0	+1	Advance to play-ins
6	New York Excelsior	16	7	9	7	0.438	29	32	0	−3	
7	Guangzhou Charge	16	5	11	5	0.313	20	38	4	−18	
8	Los Angeles Valiant	16	0	16	0	0.000	2	48	1	−46	

Source: The Overwatch League
Rules for classification: 1) points; 2) winning percentage (including tournaments); 3) regular season wins; 4) regular season map differential

== Game log ==
=== Regular season ===
2021 game log
May Melee

Qualifier match 1	April 24	Chengdu Hunters	3	–	0	New York Excelsior	Online
	5:00 am EDT	Details					
		2	Nepal			0	
		1	Dorado			0	
		2	Temple of Anubis			0	

Qualifier match 2	April 25	Hangzhou Spark	1	–	3	New York Excelsior	Online
	5:00 am EDT	Details					
		1	Busan			2	
		2	Havana			3	
		2	Volskaya Industries			0	
		1	King's Row			3	

Qualifier match 3	April 30	Seoul Dynasty	3	–	0	New York Excelsior	Online
	6:30 am EDT	Details					
		2	Lijiang Tower			0	
		2	Hanamura			1	
		3	Eichenwalde			2	

Qualifier match 4	May 01	Shanghai Dragons	3	–	0	New York Excelsior	Online
	8:00 am EDT	Details					
		2	Ilios			1	
		2	Temple of Anubis			1	
		3	Blizzard World			1	

June Joust

Qualifier match 1	May 22	New York Excelsior	3	–	1	Philadelphia Fusion	Online
	8:00 am EDT	Details					
		2	Lijiang Tower			0	
		3	Numbani			0	
		2	Rialto			3	
		2	Volskaya Industries			0	

Qualifier match 2	May 23	New York Excelsior	1	–	3	Guangzhou Charge	Online
	6:30 am EDT	Details					
		1	Nepal			2	
		1	Hollywood			3	
		3	Junkertown			1	
		0	Hanamura			1	

Qualifier match 3	May 29	New York Excelsior	1	–	3	Seoul Dynasty	Online
	6:30 am EDT	Details					
		1	Oasis			2	
		3	Junkertown			2	
		0	Hanamura			1	
		3	Hollywood			4	

Qualifier match 4	May 30	New York Excelsior	3	–	0	Los Angeles Valiant	Online
	5:00 am EDT	Details					
		2	Ilios			0	
		1	Dorado			0	
		1	Temple of Anubis			0	

Regional finals	June 06	New York Excelsior	3	–	1	Hangzhou Spark	Online
	5:00 am EDT	Details					
		0	Oasis			2	
		2	Temple of Anubis			0	
		3	Numbani			2	
		1	Dorado			0	

Tournament first round	June 10	New York Excelsior	0	–	3	Atlanta Reign	Online
	9:00 pm EDT	Details					
		0	Lijiang Tower			2	
		2	Temple of Anubis			4	
		3	Numbani			4	

Lower round 1	June 11	New York Excelsior	0	–	3	Shanghai Dragons	Online
	10:45 pm EDT	Details					
		0	Busan			2	
		0	Temple of Anubis			2	
		2	Numbani			3	

Summer Showdown

Qualifier match 1	June 26	Guangzhou Charge	3	–	2	New York Excelsior	Online
	8:00 am EDT	Details					
		2	Lijiang Tower			0	
		2	King's Row			3	
		4	Junkertown			3	
		3	Volskaya Industries			4	
		2	Oasis			1	

Qualifier match 2	June 27	New York Excelsior	3	–	0	Los Angeles Valiant	Online
	8:00 am EDT	Details					
		2	Ilios			0	
		3	Hollywood			0	
		3	Watchpoint: Gibraltar			1	

Qualifier match 3	July 09	Hangzhou Spark	3	–	2	New York Excelsior	Online
	5:00 am EDT	Details					
		1	Oasis			2	
		3	Volskaya Industries			2	
		3	King's Row			2	
		2	Junkertown			3	
		2	Nepal			0	

Qualifier match 4	July 10	New York Excelsior	3	–	1	Philadelphia Fusion	Online
	5:00 am EDT	Details					
		2	Busan			1	
		2	Temple of Anubis			1	
		2	Eichenwalde			3	
		2	Route 66			1	

Regional finals	July 11	New York Excelsior	0	–	3	Shanghai Dragons	Online
	5:12 am EDT	Details					
		0	Ilios			2	
		2	Volskaya Industries			3	
		4	King's Row			5	

Countdown Cup

Qualifier match 1	July 31	New York Excelsior	3	–	0	Los Angeles Valiant	Online
	6:30 am EDT	Details					
		2	Oasis			1	
		3	Blizzard World			2	
		3	Rialto			1	

Qualifier match 2	August 01	Shanghai Dragons	2	–	3	New York Excelsior	Online
	6:30 am EDT	Details					
		1	Ilios			2	
		3	King's Row			2	
		1	Havana			2	
		3	Volskaya Industries			2	
		1	Lijiang Tower			2	

Qualifier match 3	August 07	New York Excelsior	1	–	3	Philadelphia Fusion	Online
	5:00 am EDT	Details					
		1	Lijiang Tower			2	
		0	Route 66			3	
		2	Hanamura			1	
		2	Numbani			3	

Qualifier match 4	August 08	Chengdu Hunters	3	–	1	New York Excelsior	Online
	6:30 am EDT	Details					
		0	Nepal			2	
		3	Rialto			1	
		2	Volskaya Industries			1	
		3	King's Row			1	

Regional finals	August 15	New York Excelsior	1	–	3	Chengdu Hunters	Online
	5:05 am EDT	Details					
		0	Ilios			2	
		4	Hanamura			3	
		4	King's Row			5	
		2	Havana			3	

2021 season schedule
