= Washington Justice =

American professional esports team

- Founded: 2018
- Disbanded: 2024
- Last season: 2023
- League: Overwatch League
- Region: West
- Team history: Washington Justice (2018–present)
- Based in: Washington, D.C., US
- Colors
- Owner: Mark Ein
- Main sponsor: Events DC
- Website: Official website

Uniforms

Washington Justice was an American professional Overwatch esports team based in Washington, D.C. The Justice competed in the Overwatch League (OWL) as member of the league's West region. Founded in 2018, Washington Justice began play as one of eight expansion teams in 2019. The team is owned by Mark Ein, who founded Washington Esports Ventures to manage the franchise. The team reached the season playoffs two times. After the conclusion of the Overwatch League's final season in 2023, the Washington Justice ceased operations.

== Franchise history ==
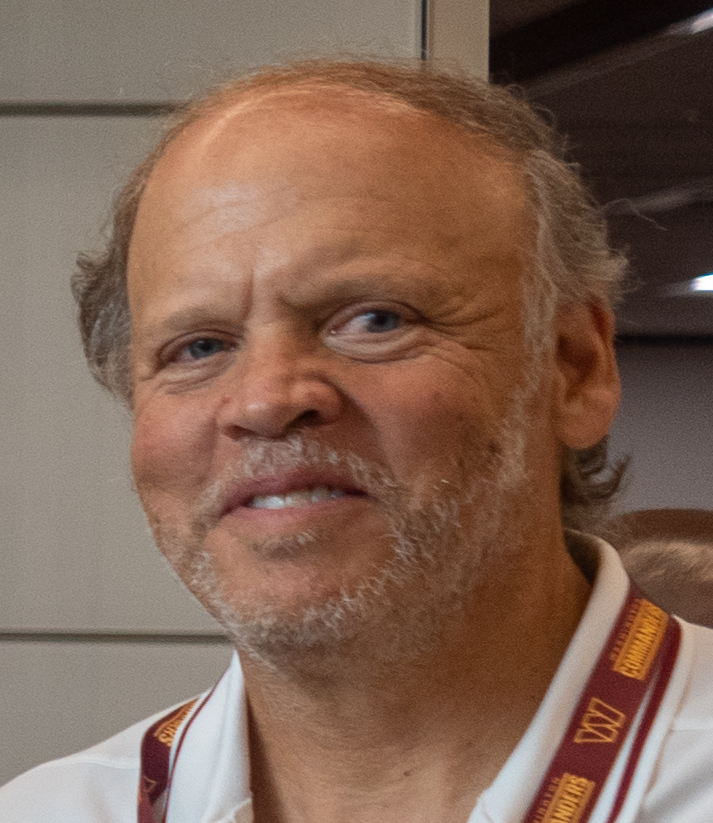
The Justice are owned by Washington Esports Ventures, founded by D.C. venture capitalist Mark Ein.

On September 7, 2018, Activision Blizzard announced that Washington Esports Ventures, a venture led by local investor and entrepreneur Mark Ein, had purchased an expansion team based in Washington, D.C. for Overwatch League's second season.

On September 12, Washington announced the signing of former New York Excelsior coach Kim "WizardHyeong" Hyeong-seok as the team's head coach. Eight days later, Washington signed Molly "AVALLA" Kim as an analyst; AVALLA is the first female coach to be signed in the history of the Overwatch League. On November 29, the team revealed they would be called Washington Justice.

Washington Justice's first OWL match was on February 16, 2019, against the New York Excelsior in which Washington lost 1–3. The Justice's first victory did not come until the last match of Stage 1, when on March 17, the team defeated the Florida Mayhem by a score of 3–2, giving Washington a Stage 1 record of 1–6. Despite numerous pickup throughout the season, including the acquisitions of Hong "ArK" Yeon-jun from the New York Excelsior and Nikola "sleepy" Andrews from the San Francisco Shock, the Justice struggled throughout the first three stages of the season, posting a 2–19 record in the first 21 games. However, they team performed much better after the league's implementation of an enforced 2-2-2 role lock for Stage 4. Behind the damage duo of Ethan "Stratus" Yankel and Corey "Corey" Nigra, the team lost only one match in their final seven games to finish the in 17th place with an 8–20 record.

Following the 2019 season, the Justice parted ways with their entire coaching staff. The team also parted ways with six of their players, leaving Stratus, Corey, and ArK, as well as the tank duo Lukas "Lullsish" Wiklund and Elliot "Ellivote" Vaneryd, who did not play in the 2019 season due to visa issues. Washington signed former Los Angeles Gladiators assistant coach Seetoh "JohnGalt" Jian Qing as their new head coach and picked up several veterans to the team, such as support player Kwon "AimGod" Min-seok and tank player Gye "Roar" Chang-hoon. After a 3–9 start to the 2020 season, both Corey and Stratus retired. Shifting to an all-Korean roster, the team picked up former Vancouver Titans players Choi "JJanu" Hyeon-woo and Lee "Stitch" Chung-hee in late May to early June. Head coach JohnGalt left the team shortly after the signing of Stitch, and Washington promoted performance coach Han "Sup7eme" Seung-jun as their new head coach. After finishing the 2020 regular season with a 4–17 record, the Justice swept both the Vancouver Titans and Dallas Fuel in the North America play-in tournament to qualify for the season playoffs. Ahead of the North America playoffs, the Justice signed former Dallas Fuel damage player Jang "Decay" Gui-un. In their first match in the North America bracket, Washington squandered an early 2–0 lead over the San Francisco Shock and lost by a score of 2–3, sending them to the lower bracket. The Justice won their next two games, defeating the third-seeded Paris Eternal and fourth-seeded Florida Mayhem. Needing one more win to qualify for the Grand Finals Bracket, Washington next faced the top-seeded Philadelphia Fusion. However, the Justice lost the match, 0–3, ending their playoff run.

Ahead of the 2021 season, the Justice parted ways with several players, including AimGod, Stitch, JJanu, and ArK. The team upgraded their tank lineup with the signings of touted rookie prospect Kim "Mag" Tae-sung and former Fusion player Kim "Fury" Jun-ho, while looking to improve their support lineup with the signings of veterans Jung "Closer" Won-sik and Yoon "BeBe" Hee-chang. The team also brought in three damage players to compliment Decay, such as rookie Kim "Assassin" Sung-won. In the first tournament cycle of the season, the May Melee, the Justice were one of two teams to go 4–0 in the qualifier stage. However, the team lost to the Florida Mayhem in the regional knockouts, failing to advance to the interregional tournament. The team went through hot and cold streaks throughout the season, ending with a 9–7 regular season record. The finish advanced the team to the West region play-in tournament; after the Justice defeated the Houston Outlaws in the finals, they advanced to the season playoffs as the eighth, and final, seed. The team was unable to secure a win in the playoffs, losing to the Dallas Fuel, 1–3, and Atlanta Reign, 0–3.

The Washington Justice disbanded following the Overwatch League's final season in 2023.

== Team identity ==
On November 29, 2018, the franchise name was revealed as the Washington Justice; the name "Justice" represents the teams core values. "Justice is a universal value and the perfect name for a franchise that we hope will inspire and unite both our Washington area community and fans around the globe", said owner Mark Ein. "There is no region in the world that attracts more people to serve the cause of justice in government, philanthropy, academia, military service, and the private sector than Washington. In fact, DC's official city motto is 'Justitia Omnibus,' which translates to 'Justice for All.' As a team representing the broader DMV region, it was important that our team identity reflects a value that unifies all of our community members, representing the full diversity of backgrounds and beliefs." The team's logo is a red, white, and blue striped shield, representing the American flag, with the Washington Monument centered in a subtle W at the bottom.

== Personnel ==
=== Roster ===
Washington Justice roster
Players
Coaches

Role	No.	Handle	Name	Nationality
Damage	12	Flora	Lim Young-woo	South Korea
Damage	27	AlphaYi	Kim Jun	South Korea
Support	15	Teru	Kim Min-gi	South Korea

Head coach

- Vacant

Assistant coach(es)

- Danny “Danny” Mychakov

Legend:
- (I) Inactive
- (S) Suspended
- (2W) Two-way player
- Substitute
- (injured) Injury / Illness

Latest roster transaction: October 18, 2023.

=== Head coaches ===
Handle	Name	Seasons	Record	Notes	Ref.
WizardHyeong	Kim Hyeong-seok	2019	8–20 (.286)		
JohnGalt	Seetoh Jian Qing	2020	3–10 (.231)	Released after 13 games	
Sup7eme	Han Seung-jun	2020–2022	21–27 (.438)		
GetAmazed	Zouheir Baba	2023	6–10 (.375)		

== Awards and records ==
=== Seasons overview ===
Season	P	W	L	W%	Finish	Playoffs
2019	28	8	20	.286	8th, Atlantic	Did not qualify
2020	21	4	17	.190	9th, North America	Lost in NA Lower Final, 0–3 (Fusion)
2021	16	9	7	.563	6th, West	Lost in Lower Round 1, 0–3 (Reign)
2022	24	11	13	.458	9th, West	Did not qualify
2023	16	6	10	.375	10th, West	Did not qualify

=== Individual accomplishments ===
Role Star selections

- Corey (Corey Nigra) – 2019

All-Star Game selections

- ArK (Hong Yeon-jun) – 2019
- Decay (Jang Gui-un) – 2020
