= 2021 Overwatch League season =

- League: Overwatch League
- Sport: Overwatch
- Duration: April 16 – August 21; September 4 – 25 (Playoffs)
- Matches: 16
- Teams: 20
- TV partners: YouTube; Bilibili; Sport1

Regular season
- Top seed: Shanghai Dragons
- Season MVP: Xin "Leave" Huang

Midseason tournament champions
- May Melee: Dallas Fuel
- June Joust: Shanghai Dragons
- Summer Showdown: Shanghai Dragons
- Countdown Cup: Los Angeles Gladiators

Grand Finals
- Venue: Online
- Champions: Shanghai Dragons
- Runners-up: Atlanta Reign
- Finals MVP: Lee "LIP" Jae-won

Overwatch League seasons
- ← 2020 2022 →

The 2021 Overwatch League season was the fourth season of the Overwatch League (OWL), a professional esports league for the video game Overwatch. The regular season began on April 16, 2021, and concluded on August 21. The season featured four midseason tournaments throughout the regular season along with a new point system for season playoff seeding. Similar to the 2020 season, teams are split into two geographical regions. Due to the COVID-19 pandemic, most matches were played online, with the exception of several live events throughout the season. The season marks the second year of the Overwatch League's broadcast partnership with YouTube, their third with Sport1, and their first with Bilibili.

The postseason began on September 4 with two regional play-in tournaments acting as qualifiers for the season playoffs. The playoffs began on September 21 and culminated with the Grand Finals on September 25. The Shanghai Dragons won the Grand Finals over the Atlanta Reign to win their first OWL championship.

== Format ==
=== Regions and live events ===
After all matches were rescheduled to be played strictly online due to the COVID-19 pandemic, the 2020 season saw the OWL divide teams into two regions, North America and Asia, in an effort to reduce lag due to online play. For the 2021 season, the twenty teams were divided into two regions, the East and West. Eight teams from China and South Korea competed in the East Region, while twelve teams from North America and Europe competed in the West Division.

The majority of matches in the 2021 season were played online. Three live events were planned to be hosted by three teams in China: Hangzhou Spark in June, Shanghai Dragons in July, and Guangzhou Charge in August. All five China-based teams travelled to these events, while the three Korea-based teams played at the events remotely via the league's cloud server. The Charge's homestand in August was cancelled, however, due to COVID-19 concerns. Additionally, the Dallas Fuel hosted a homestand in July at Esports Stadium Arlington.

=== Midseason tournaments ===
The league expanded upon the tournament format that was introduced in the 2020 season. Four standalone tournaments, the May Melee, June Joust, Summer Showdown, and Countdown Cup, were spread throughout the regular season with teams from both regions competing against each other. Hero pools, a system in which some heroes are unplayable, were used in two of the four tournaments: the June Joust and Countdown Cup. For each tournament, teams played four weeks of regional qualifier matches. The top six teams from the West and the top four teams from the East advanced to regional knockout matches, and the top two teams from each region advanced from the knockouts to play in the interregional tournament. In an effort to minimize lag, the qualifying Western teams traveled to the University of Hawaiʻi at Mānoa for each interregional tournament. The internet service provider at the University of Hawaii was directly connected to a cloud-based server in Tokyo, Japan via an underwater sea cable, while the qualifying Eastern teams did not travel anywhere and connected to the Tokyo server from Asia. With this setup, the league was able to equal latencies for all participating players with a "minimum-latency tool" developed by Activision.

=== Season playoffs ===
Contrasted to previous seasons, where playoff seeding was determined by teams' win–loss record throughout the regular season, the league implemented a point system, called League Points, to determine regular season standings. Every win in the regular season earned a team one point. A first-, second-, or third-place finish in each midseason tournament earned the placing team an additional three, two, or one point, respectively. A total of eight teams advanced to the season playoffs: the top three teams from the West and the top two teams from the East, based on League Points, advanced directly to the season playoffs. Seeds four through nine in the Western region and seeds three through five in the Eastern region in the advanced to their respective region's play-in tournament, with two teams from the West and one team from the East advancing to the season playoffs.

== Regular season ==
The 2021 schedule was released on February 20, 2021, and the regular season began on April 16.

East region

Pos	Team	Pld	W	L	Pts	PCT	MW	ML	MT	MD	Qualification
1	Shanghai Dragons	16	12	4	20	0.750	38	19	2	+19	Advance to season playoffs
2	Chengdu Hunters	16	11	5	15	0.688	38	22	2	+16	Advance to season playoffs
3	Seoul Dynasty	16	12	4	12	0.750	40	22	0	+18	Advance to play-ins
4	Philadelphia Fusion	16	10	6	10	0.625	37	24	3	+13	Advance to play-ins
5	Hangzhou Spark	16	7	9	7	0.438	32	31	0	+1	Advance to play-ins
6	New York Excelsior	16	7	9	7	0.438	29	32	0	−3	
7	Guangzhou Charge	16	5	11	5	0.313	20	38	4	−18	
8	Los Angeles Valiant	16	0	16	0	0.000	2	48	1	−46	

Source: The Overwatch League
Rules for classification: 1) points; 2) winning percentage (including tournaments); 3) regular season wins; 4) regular season map differential

West region

Pos	Team	Pld	W	L	Pts	PCT	MW	ML	MT	MD	Qualification
1	Dallas Fuel	16	11	5	17	0.688	40	26	3	+14	Advance to season playoffs
2	Los Angeles Gladiators	16	11	5	14	0.688	41	21	0	+20	Advance to season playoffs
3	Atlanta Reign	16	11	5	13	0.688	41	21	0	+20	Advance to season playoffs
4	San Francisco Shock	16	12	4	12	0.750	43	24	2	+19	Advance to play-ins
5	Houston Outlaws	16	11	5	11	0.688	34	24	3	+10	Advance to play-ins
6	Washington Justice	16	9	7	9	0.563	29	26	2	+3	Advance to play-ins
7	Toronto Defiant	16	9	7	9	0.563	31	31	0	0	Advance to play-ins
8	Paris Eternal	16	8	8	8	0.500	32	32	2	0	Advance to play-ins
9	Boston Uprising	16	7	9	7	0.438	27	31	1	−4	Advance to play-ins
10	Florida Mayhem	16	5	11	6	0.313	26	38	2	−12	
11	London Spitfire	16	1	15	1	0.063	12	47	1	−35	
12	Vancouver Titans	16	1	15	1	0.063	10	45	0	−35	

Source: The Overwatch League
Rules for classification: 1) points; 2) winning percentage (including tournaments); 3) regular season wins; 4) regular season map differential

=== May Melee ===
The May Melee was the first of four midseason tournaments of the season. Qualifiers began on April 16 and concluded on May 1. The regional knockouts began on May 2, and the May Melee tournament between the top two teams from each region began on May 7.

==== Qualifiers ====
East region

Pos	Team	Pld	W	L	PCT	MW	ML	MT	MD	Qualification
1	Philadelphia Fusion	4	4	0	1.00	12	3	0	+9	Advance to regional knockouts
2	Seoul Dynasty	4	3	1	0.75	10	3	0	+7	Advance to regional knockouts
3	Chengdu Hunters	4	3	1	0.75	10	4	0	+6	Advance to regional knockouts
4	Shanghai Dragons	4	3	1	0.75	9	5	1	+4	Advance to regional knockouts
5	Hangzhou Spark	4	1	3	0.25	7	9	0	−2	
6	Guangzhou Charge	4	1	3	0.25	3	9	1	−6	
7	New York Excelsior	4	1	3	0.25	3	10	0	−7	
8	Los Angeles Valiant	4	0	4	0.00	1	12	0	−11	

Source: The Overwatch League
Rules for classification: 1) winning percentage; 2) map differential; 3) head-to-head record; 4) head-to-head map differential

West region

Pos	Team	Pld	W	L	PCT	MW	ML	MT	MD	Qualification
1	Washington Justice	4	4	0	1.00	12	3	0	+9	Advance to regional knockouts
2	Houston Outlaws	4	4	0	1.00	12	5	1	+7	Advance to regional knockouts
3	San Francisco Shock	4	3	1	0.75	11	6	1	+5	Advance to regional knockouts
4	Florida Mayhem	4	3	1	0.75	9	6	0	+3	Advance to regional knockouts
5	Toronto Defiant	4	3	1	0.75	9	7	0	+2	Advance to regional knockouts
6	Dallas Fuel	4	2	2	0.50	9	7	0	+2	Advance to regional knockouts
7	Los Angeles Gladiators	4	2	2	0.50	8	6	0	+2	
8	Atlanta Reign	4	1	3	0.25	8	9	0	−1	
9	Paris Eternal	4	1	3	0.25	5	10	0	−5	
10	Boston Uprising	4	1	3	0.25	4	11	0	−7	
11	Vancouver Titans	4	0	4	0.00	4	12	0	−8	
12	London Spitfire	4	0	4	0.00	3	12	0	−9	

Source: The Overwatch League
Rules for classification: 1) winning percentage; 2) map differential; 3) head-to-head record; 4) head-to-head map differential

==== Regional knockouts ====
East region

Semifinals
1	Philadelphia Fusion	2
4	Shanghai Dragons	3
2	Seoul Dynasty	1
3	Chengdu Hunters	3

West region

Semifinals
4	Florida Mayhem	3
5	Toronto Defiant	0
3	San Francisco Shock	0
6	Dallas Fuel	3

Finals
1	Washington Justice	1
4	Florida Mayhem	3
2	Houston Outlaws	0
6	Dallas Fuel	3

==== Tournament weekend ====
Upper round 1
W1	Florida Mayhem	2
E2	Shanghai Dragons	3
E1	Chengdu Hunters	1
W2	Dallas Fuel	3
Lower round 1
W1	Florida Mayhem	3
E1	Chengdu Hunters	1

Upper finals
E2	Shanghai Dragons	2
W2	Dallas Fuel	3
Lower finals
E2	Shanghai Dragons	3
W1	Florida Mayhem	0

Finals
W2	Dallas Fuel	4
E2	Shanghai Dragons	2

=== June Joust ===
The June Joust was the second of four midseason tournaments of the season. For the tournament, four heroes were banned from all qualifying and tournament matches: Tracer, Sombra, Reinhardt, and Zenyatta. Qualifiers began on May 21 and concluded on June 5. The regional knockouts began on June 6, and the May Melee tournament between the top two teams from each region began on June 11.

==== Qualifiers ====
East region

Pos	Team	Pld	W	L	PCT	MW	ML	MT	MD	Qualification
1	Hangzhou Spark	4	4	0	1.00	12	2	0	+10	Advance to regional knockouts
2	Shanghai Dragons	4	3	1	0.75	9	4	1	+5	Advance to regional knockouts
3	Seoul Dynasty	4	3	1	0.75	10	6	0	+4	Advance to regional knockouts
4	New York Excelsior	4	2	2	0.50	8	7	0	+1	Advance to regional knockouts
5	Philadelphia Fusion	4	2	2	0.50	8	7	2	+1	
6	Chengdu Hunters	4	1	3	0.25	6	10	1	−4	
7	Guangzhou Charge	4	1	3	0.25	4	10	1	−6	
8	Los Angeles Valiant	4	0	4	0.00	1	12	1	−11	

Source: The Overwatch League
Rules for classification: 1) winning percentage; 2) map differential; 3) head-to-head record; 4) head-to-head map differential

West region

Pos	Team	Pld	W	L	PCT	MW	ML	MT	MD	Qualification
1	Los Angeles Gladiators	4	4	0	1.00	12	3	0	+9	Advance to regional knockouts
2	San Francisco Shock	4	4	0	1.00	12	4	1	+8	Advance to regional knockouts
3	Atlanta Reign	4	3	1	0.75	10	4	0	+6	Advance to regional knockouts
4	Houston Outlaws	4	3	1	0.75	10	5	0	+5	Advance to regional knockouts
5	Dallas Fuel	4	3	1	0.75	10	5	1	+5	Advance to regional knockouts
6	Boston Uprising	4	2	2	0.50	9	6	0	+3	Advance to regional knockouts
7	Paris Eternal	4	2	2	0.50	8	8	2	0	
8	Washington Justice	4	1	3	0.25	5	9	2	−4	
9	Florida Mayhem	4	1	3	0.25	6	10	0	−4	
10	Toronto Defiant	4	1	3	0.25	5	10	0	−5	
11	London Spitfire	4	0	4	0.00	1	12	0	−11	
12	Vancouver Titans	4	0	4	0.00	0	12	0	−12	

Source: The Overwatch League
Rules for classification: 1) winning percentage; 2) map differential; 3) head-to-head record; 4) head-to-head map differential

==== Regional knockouts ====
East region

Semifinals
1	Hangzhou Spark	1
4	New York Excelsior	3
2	Shanghai Dragons	3
3	Seoul Dynasty	0

West region

Semifinals
4	Houston Outlaws	0
5	Dallas Fuel	3
3	Atlanta Reign	3
6	Boston Uprising	0

Finals
1	Los Angeles Gladiators	1
5	Dallas Fuel	3
2	San Francisco Shock	0
3	Atlanta Reign	3

==== Tournament weekend ====
Upper round 1
W1	Atlanta Reign	3
E2	New York Excelsior	0
E1	Shanghai Dragons	0
W2	Dallas Fuel	3
Lower round 1
E2	New York Excelsior	0
E1	Shanghai Dragons	3

Upper finals
W1	Atlanta Reign	1
W2	Dallas Fuel	3
Lower finals
W1	Atlanta Reign	0
E1	Shanghai Dragons	3

Finals
W2	Dallas Fuel	3
E1	Shanghai Dragons	4

=== Summer Showdown ===
The Summer Showdown was the third of four midseason tournaments of the season. Qualifiers began on June 25 and concluded on July 10. The regional knockouts began on July 11, and the tournament began on July 16.

==== Qualifiers ====
East region

Pos	Team	Pld	W	L	PCT	MW	ML	MT	MD	Qualification
1	Shanghai Dragons	4	4	0	1.00	12	1	0	+11	Advance to regional knockouts
2	Chengdu Hunters	4	3	1	0.75	10	5	0	+5	Advance to regional knockouts
3	Seoul Dynasty	4	3	1	0.75	9	6	0	+3	Advance to regional knockouts
4	New York Excelsior	4	2	2	0.50	10	7	0	+3	Advance to regional knockouts
5	Hangzhou Spark	4	2	2	0.50	7	8	0	−1	
6	Philadelphia Fusion	4	1	3	0.25	6	9	1	−3	
7	Guangzhou Charge	4	1	3	0.25	5	11	1	−6	
8	Los Angeles Valiant	4	0	4	0.00	0	12	0	−12	

Source: The Overwatch League
Rules for classification: 1) winning percentage; 2) map differential; 3) head-to-head record; 4) head-to-head map differential

West region

Pos	Team	Pld	W	L	PCT	MW	ML	MT	MD	Qualification
1	Dallas Fuel	4	4	0	1.00	12	5	1	+7	Advance to regional knockouts
2	Atlanta Reign	4	3	1	0.75	11	3	0	+8	Advance to regional knockouts
3	Boston Uprising	4	3	1	0.75	9	4	1	+5	Advance to regional knockouts
4	Washington Justice	4	3	1	0.75	9	5	0	+4	Advance to regional knockouts
5	Paris Eternal	4	3	1	0.75	10	6	0	+4	Advance to regional knockouts
6	Los Angeles Gladiators	4	2	2	0.50	10	8	0	+2	Advance to regional knockouts
7	San Francisco Shock	4	2	2	0.50	9	9	0	0	
8	Houston Outlaws	4	2	2	0.50	6	7	1	−1	
9	Toronto Defiant	4	2	2	0.50	7	8	0	−1	
10	Florida Mayhem	4	0	4	0.00	4	12	1	−8	
11	London Spitfire	4	0	4	0.00	3	12	0	−9	
12	Vancouver Titans	4	0	4	0.00	1	12	0	−11	

Source: The Overwatch League
Rules for classification: 1) winning percentage; 2) map differential; 3) head-to-head record; 4) head-to-head map differential

==== Regional knockouts ====
East region

Semifinals
1	Shanghai Dragons	3
4	New York Excelsior	0
2	Chengdu Hunters	3
3	Seoul Dynasty	2

West region

Semifinals
4	Washington Justice	3
5	Paris Eternal	2
3	Boston Uprising	0
6	Los Angeles Gladiators	3

Finals
1	Dallas Fuel	3
4	Washington Justice	2
2	Atlanta Reign	3
6	Los Angeles Gladiators	2

==== Tournament weekend ====
Upper round 1
W1	Dallas Fuel	1
E2	Chengdu Hunters	3
E1	Shanghai Dragons	3
W2	Atlanta Reign	0
Lower round 1
W1	Dallas Fuel	3
W2	Atlanta Reign	2

Upper finals
E2	Chengdu Hunters	2
E1	Shanghai Dragons	3
Lower finals
E2	Chengdu Hunters	3
W1	Dallas Fuel	0

Finals
E1	Shanghai Dragons	4
E2	Chengdu Hunters	1

=== Countdown Cup ===
The Countdown Cup was the last of four midseason tournaments of the season. For the tournament, four heroes were banned from all qualifying and tournament matches: Echo, Ashe, Sigma, and Lúcio. Qualifiers began on July 30 and concluded on August 14. The regional knockouts take place on August 15, and the tournament began on August 19.

==== Qualifiers ====
East region

Pos	Team	Pld	W	L	PCT	MW	ML	MT	MD	Qualification
1	Chengdu Hunters	4	4	0	1.00	12	3	1	+9	Advance to regional knockouts
2	Philadelphia Fusion	4	3	1	0.75	11	5	0	+6	Advance to regional knockouts
3	Seoul Dynasty	4	3	1	0.75	11	7	0	+4	Advance to regional knockouts
4	New York Excelsior	4	2	2	0.50	8	8	0	0	Advance to regional knockouts
5	Guangzhou Charge	4	2	2	0.50	8	8	1	0	
6	Shanghai Dragons	4	2	2	0.50	8	9	0	−1	
7	Hangzhou Spark	4	0	4	0.00	6	12	0	−6	
8	Los Angeles Valiant	4	0	4	0.00	0	12	0	−12	

Source: The Overwatch League
Rules for classification: 1) winning percentage; 2) map differential; 3) head-to-head record; 4) head-to-head map differential

West region

Pos	Team	Pld	W	L	PCT	MW	ML	MT	MD	Qualification
1	Atlanta Reign	4	4	0	1.00	12	5	0	+7	Advance to regional knockouts
2	Los Angeles Gladiators	4	3	1	0.75	11	4	0	+7	Advance to regional knockouts
3	San Francisco Shock	4	3	1	0.75	11	5	0	+6	Advance to regional knockouts
4	Toronto Defiant	4	3	1	0.75	10	6	0	+4	Advance to regional knockouts
5	Paris Eternal	4	2	2	0.50	9	8	0	+1	Advance to regional knockouts
6	Dallas Fuel	4	2	2	0.50	9	9	1	0	Advance to regional knockouts
7	Houston Outlaws	4	2	2	0.50	6	7	1	−1	
8	Florida Mayhem	4	1	3	0.25	7	10	1	−3	
9	Vancouver Titans	4	1	3	0.25	5	9	0	−4	
10	Boston Uprising	4	1	3	0.25	5	10	0	−5	
11	London Spitfire	4	1	3	0.25	5	11	1	−6	
12	Washington Justice	4	1	3	0.25	3	9	0	−6	

Source: The Overwatch League
Rules for classification: 1) winning percentage; 2) map differential; 3) head-to-head record; 4) head-to-head map differential

==== Regional knockouts ====
East region

Semifinals
1	Chengdu Hunters	3
4	New York Excelsior	1
2	Philadelphia Fusion	1
3	Seoul Dynasty	3

West region

Semifinals
4	Toronto Defiant	3
5	Paris Eternal	2
3	San Francisco Shock	3
6	Dallas Fuel	0

Finals
1	Atlanta Reign	3
4	Toronto Defiant	1
2	Los Angeles Gladiators	3
3	San Francisco Shock	2

==== Tournament weekend ====
Upper round 1
W1	Atlanta Reign	3
E2	Seoul Dynasty	1
E1	Chengdu Hunters	2
W2	Los Angeles Gladiators	3
Lower round 1
E1	Chengdu Hunters	3
E2	Seoul Dynasty	0

Upper finals
W1	Atlanta Reign	0
W2	Los Angeles Gladiators	3
Lower finals
W1	Atlanta Reign	0
E1	Chengdu Hunters	3

Finals
W2	Los Angeles Gladiators	4
E1	Chengdu Hunters	3

== Postseason ==
=== Play-in tournaments ===
The play-in tournaments were two regional single-elimination tournaments that took place September 4–5 and advanced two Western teams and one Eastern team to the season playoffs. In the Western region, seeds four through nine, based on regular season standings, advanced to the Western play-in tournament. The first round was contested by seeds six through nine, with the sixth seed selecting either the eighth or ninth seed as their opponent. The winners of the first round advanced to the finals, with the fourth seed choosing their opponent from the winners of the first round. In the Eastern region, seeds three through five, based on regular season standings, advanced to the Eastern play-in tournament. The fourth and fifth seed competed in the first round, and the winner of the first round faced the third seed in the final. In both regions, the winner of the finals advanced to the season playoffs.

==== Brackets ====
East region

Semifinals; September 5
4	Philadelphia Fusion	3
5	Hangzhou Spark	1

Finals; September 5
3	Seoul Dynasty	1
4	Philadelphia Fusion	3

West region

Semifinals; September 4
6	Washington Justice	3
8	Paris Eternal	0
7	Toronto Defiant	3
9	Boston Uprising	0

Finals; September 5
4	San Francisco Shock	3
7	Toronto Defiant	0
5	Houston Outlaws	2
6	Washington Justice	3

=== Playoffs ===
The playoffs were a double-elimination tournament contested by eight teams – five from the West region and three from the East region. All matches in season playoffs, aside from the final match, took place from September 21 to 24. The final two teams remaining in the tournament advanced to the Grand Finals, which took place on September 25. Playoff matches, aside from the Grand Finals, were planned to take place live at Esports Stadium Arlington in Arlington, Texas, while the Grand Finals was planned to take place at the Galen Center in Los Angeles, California; however, the OWL announced on August 25, 2021, that all playoff matches, including the Grand Finals, would not be played in a live format due to increasing risks of COVID-19 and the Delta variant. Instead, the West region playoff teams travelled to the University of Hawaiʻi at Mānoa, while the East region teams played in their home country, to minimize latency between competing teams.

==== Bracket ====
Upper round 1 September 21	Upper round 2 September 22	Upper final September 23	Grand Finals; September 25
1	Shanghai Dragons	3
6	San Francisco Shock	0
1	Shanghai Dragons	3
4	Los Angeles Gladiators	1
4	Los Angeles Gladiators	3
7	Philadelphia Fusion	1
1	Shanghai Dragons	3
2	Dallas Fuel	1
2	Dallas Fuel	3
8	Washington Justice	1
2	Dallas Fuel	3
3	Chengdu Hunters	0
3	Chengdu Hunters	3
5	Atlanta Reign	2	1	Shanghai Dragons	4
5	Atlanta Reign	0
Lower round 1 September 22	Lower round 2 September 23	Lower round 3 September 24	Lower final September 24
3	Chengdu Hunters	2
6	San Francisco Shock	3	6	San Francisco Shock	3	2	Dallas Fuel	1
7	Philadelphia Fusion	2	6	San Francisco Shock	1	5	Atlanta Reign	3
5	Atlanta Reign	3
4	Los Angeles Gladiators	2
5	Atlanta Reign	3	5	Atlanta Reign	3
8	Washington Justice	0

== Notable events ==
=== Chinese teams boycott Saebyeolbe ===
On April 12, 2021, while streaming on Twitch, Seoul Dynasty player Park "Saebyeolbe" Jong-ryeol commented about frustration trying to appeal to a Chinese audience while streaming on the Chinese streaming platform DouYu. In an English translation, Park said during his Twitch stream, "I can't say Taiwan and [Hong Kong]. At all. They (China) don't recognize them as countries. I got into so much trouble for saying their names. Make it make sense. What are you talking about, 'One China?' So I objected to that and all the managers said, 'If you want to earn Chinese money, you have to become a Chinese dog.' So that's what I'm doing right now. I can even say, 'Thanks for subscribing' in Chinese. Aren't I good at Chinese?"

Two days after the comments, Park apologized via a handwritten note on Instagram. Nearly three weeks after the apology, the four Chinese teams of the Overwatch League — the Shanghai Dragons, Chengdu Hunters, Hangzhou Spark, and Guangzhou Charge — announced that they would not participate in any Overwatch League event in which Park was present. On May 6, 2021, the Overwatch League issued a statement announcing that the Chinese teams would no longer be boycotting Park nor the Seoul Dynasty. As of August 18, 2021, Park has not appeared in a match since the incident.

=== Soft salary cap investigation ===
In July 2021, Dot Esports reported that the Civil Conduct Task Force of the United States Department of Justice antitrust division was investigating whether or not the league's soft salary cap policy violated the Sherman Antitrust Act of 1890, as the player's are not unionized. The league's soft salary cap per team in 2020 was US$1.6 million, and if a team went over that amount, they would have to pay additional money to the league, which would be distributed to other teams. In October 2021, Sports Business Journal reported that the OWL would be eliminating their competitive balance tax and maximum salary caps.

=== League sponsorship pulled ===
In July 2021, the California Department of Fair Employment and Housing (DFEH) filed a lawsuit against Activision Blizzard for sexual harassment and discrimination taking place within the Blizzard workplace. Two weeks after the filing, Overwatch League partners Coca-Cola, Kellogg's, State Farm, and T-Mobile announced that they would be reassessing their partnership with the league, and all branding of the aforementioned companies were removed from the league's website. Later, Kellogg's stated they "will not be moving forward" with their sponsorship of the Overwatch League. Additionally, Sports Business Journal observed that IBM's branding was removed from all Overwatch League media, including the league's official partners' page and power rankings. In mid-August 2021, the only sponsor present during Overwatch League broadcasts was voice-over-Internet Protocol software company TeamSpeak.

== Awards ==
=== Individual awards ===
Award	Recipient
Most Valuable Player (MVP)	Xin "Leave" Huang (Chengdu Hunters)
Dennis Hawelka Award	Kim "Sp9rk1e" Yeong-han (Dallas Fuel)
Rookie of the Year	Oh "Pelican" Se-hyun (Atlanta Reign)
Coach of the Year	Yun "RUSH" Hee-won (Dallas Fuel)
Grand Finals MVP	Lee "LIP" Jae-won (Shanghai Drahons)

=== Role Stars ===
Damage	Tank	Support
Xin "Leave" Huang (Chengdu Hunters)	Lee "Fearless" Eui-seok (Dallas Fuel)	Kim "Shu" Jin-seo (Los Angeles Gladiators)
Kim "SP9RK1E" Young-han (Dallas Fuel)	Choi "Hanbin" Han-been (Dallas Fuel)	Kim "Izayaki" Min-chul (Shanghai Dragons)
Lee "LIP" Jae-won (Shanghai Dragons)	Kang "Void" Jung-woo (Shanghai Dragons)	Joon "Fielder" Kwon (Dallas Fuel)
Kevin "Kevster" Persson (Los Angeles Gladiators)	Indy "Space" Halpern (Los Angeles Gladiators)	Lee "Leejaegon" Jae-gon (Shanghai Dragons)

== Media ==
The season marked the second year of the Overwatch League's the three-year broadcast contract with YouTube, which did not include broadcast rights for China. For the 2021 season, YouTube introduced clipping functionality for their videos and allowed OWL games to be rendered in 4K resolution.

Under a new, multi-year contract, Bilibili obtained production and broadcast rights in China. Bilibili has a similar deal with Riot Games' League of Legends international competitions and, prior to the deal with the Overwatch League, secured hosting rights for Overwatch Contenders and Overwatch Open Division in China. Activision Blizzard renewed a deal for TV-exclusive rights to the Overwatch League in Germany, Austria, and Switzerland with Sport1; the multi-year contract was signed after their two-year deal with Sport1 concluded.

== Winnings ==
Teams in the 2021 season competed for a total prize pool of US$4,250,000 across midseason tournaments and playoffs, with the payout division detailed below.

May Melee

Pos	Team	Bonus
1	Dallas Fuel	$100,000
2	Shanghai Dragons	$70,000
3	Florida Mayhem	$35,000
4	Chengdu Hunters	$20,000

June Joust

Pos	Team	Bonus
1	Shanghai Dragons	$100,000
2	Dallas Fuel	$70,000
3	Atlanta Reign	$35,000
4	New York Excelsior	$20,000

Summer Showdown

Pos	Team	Bonus
1	Shanghai Dragons	$100,000
2	Chengdu Hunters	$70,000
3	Dallas Fuel	$35,000
4	Atlanta Reign	$20,000

Countdown Cup

Pos	Team	Bonus
1	Los Angeles Gladiators	$100,000
2	Chengdu Hunters	$70,000
3	Atlanta Reign	$35,000
4	Seoul Dynasty	$20,000

Season playoffs

Pos	Team	Bonus
1	Shanghai Dragons	$1,500,000
2	Atlanta Reign	$700,000
3	Dallas Fuel	$350,000
4	San Francisco Shock	$250,000
5	Chengdu Hunters	$150,000
6	Los Angeles Gladiators	$150,000
7	Philadelphia Fusion	$50,000
8	Washington Justice	$50,000
