= List of San Francisco Shock players =

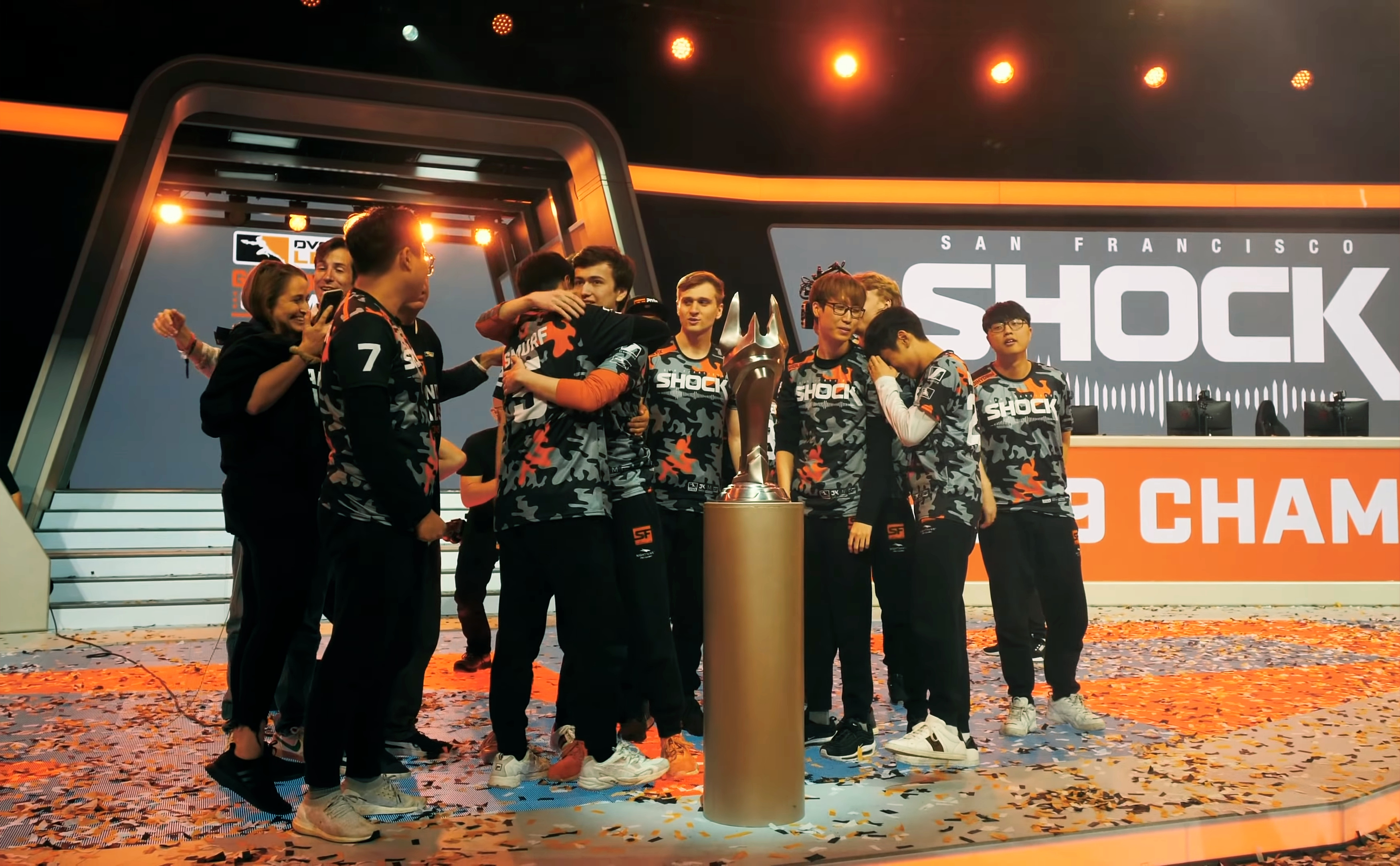
San Francisco Shock players celebrate winning the 2019 Grand Finals on September 29, 2019.

The San Francisco Shock are an American esports team founded in 2017 that compete in the Overwatch League (OWL). The Shock began playing competitive Overwatch in the 2018 season.

All signed players during all OWL seasons (including the playoffs) are included, even if they did not make an appearance.

== All-time roster ==
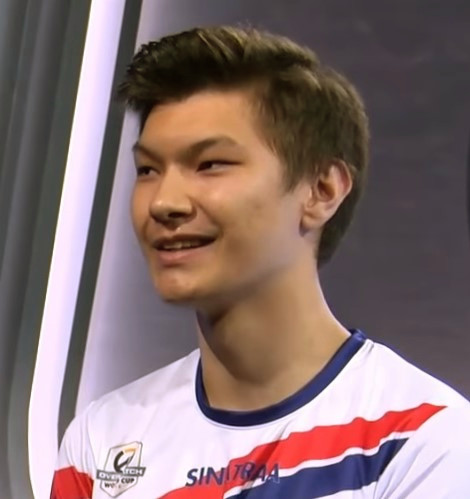
Jay "sinatraa" Won was named the 2019 Overwatch League Most Valuable Player.

As of December 16, 2021

Handle	Name	Role	Country	Seasons	Ref.
ANS	Seonchang Lee	Damage	South Korea	2020, 2021	
Architect	Minho Park	Damage	South Korea	2018–2020	
babybay	Andrej Francisty	Damage	United States	2018–2019	
ChoiHyoBin	Hyobin Choi	Tank	South Korea	2018–2021	
Danteh	Dante Cruz	Damage	United States	2018	
dhaK	Daniel Martínez Paz	Support	Spain	2018	
FDGod	Brice Monsçavoir	Support	France	2021	
FiNN	Sejin Oh	Support	South Korea	2022–present	
Glister	Gilseong Lim	Damage	South Korea	2021	
iddqd	André Dahlström	Damage	Sweden	2018	
kilo	Jinwoo Jung	Damage	South Korea	2022–present	
moth	Grant Espe	Support	United States	2018–2020	
Nevix	Andreas Karlsson	Tank	Sweden	2018–2019	
nero	Charlie Zwarg	Damage	United States	2021	
nomy	David Ramirez	Tank	Mexico	2018	
Proper	Donghyun Kim	Damage	South Korea	2022–present	
Rascal	Dongjun Kim	Damage	South Korea	2019–2020	
s9mm	Samuel Santos	Damage	United States	2022–present	
sinatraa	Jay Won	Damage	United States	2018–2020	
sleepy	Nikola Andrews	Support	United States	2018–2019	
smurf	Myeonghwan Yoo	Tank	South Korea	2019–2021	
Striker	Namju Gwon	Damage	South Korea	2019–2021	
super	Matthew DeLisi	Tank	United States	2018–2021	
Ta1yo	Sean Taiyo Henderson	Damage	Japan	2020–2021	
Twilight	Juseok Lee	Support	South Korea	2020–2021	
Viol2t	Minki Park	Support	South Korea	2019–present	
