= List of Boston Uprising players =

Boston Uprising is an American esports team founded in 2017 that competes in the Overwatch League (OWL). The Uprising began playing competitive Overwatch in the 2018 season.

All rostered players during the OWL season (including the playoffs) are included, even if they did not make an appearance.

== All-time roster ==
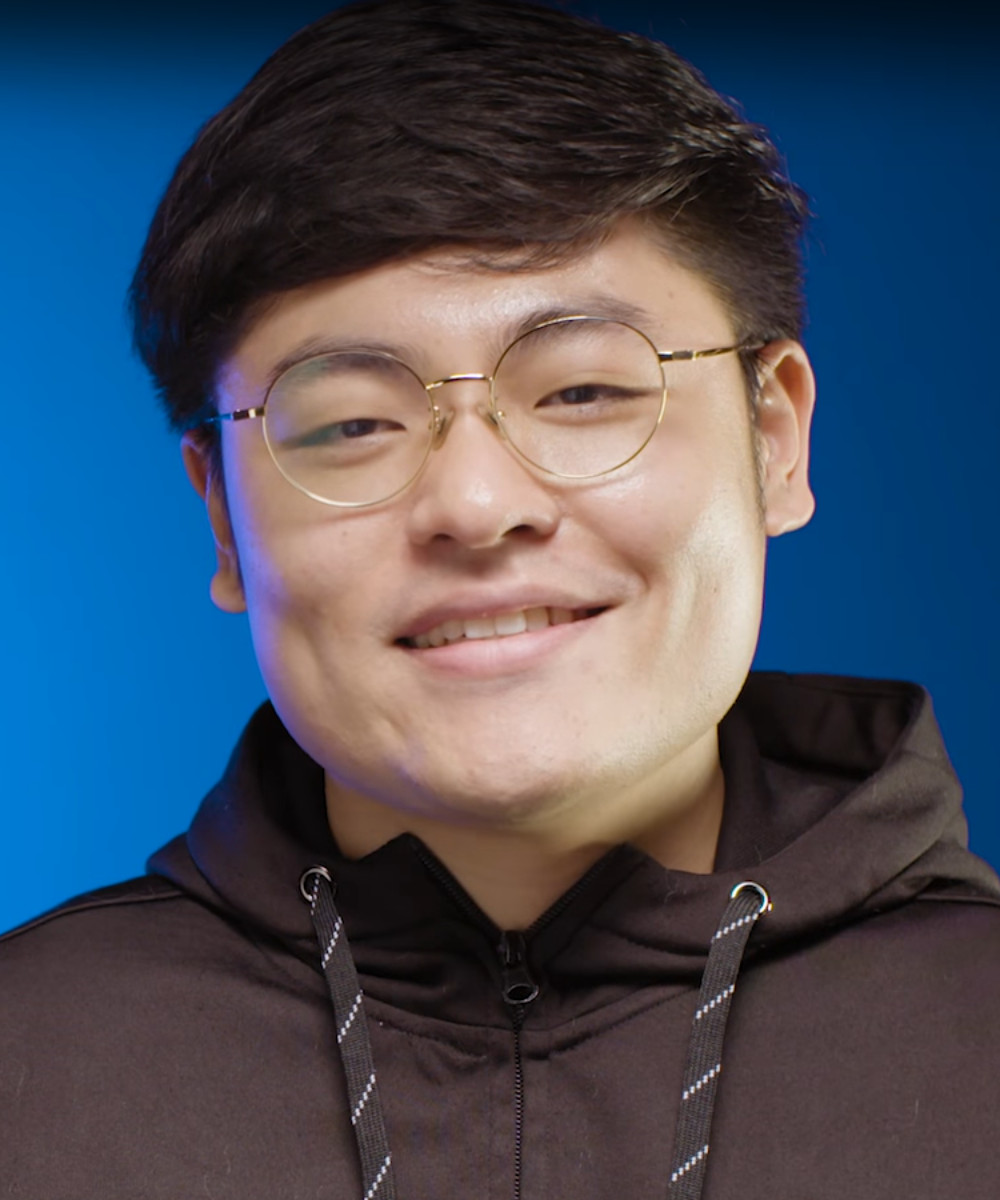
Noh "Gamsu" Yeong-Jin.

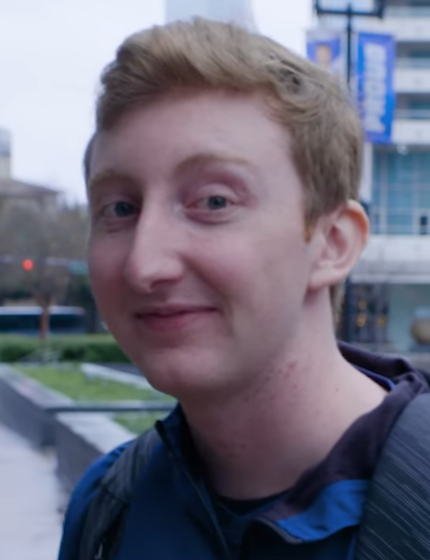
Lucas "NotE" Meissner

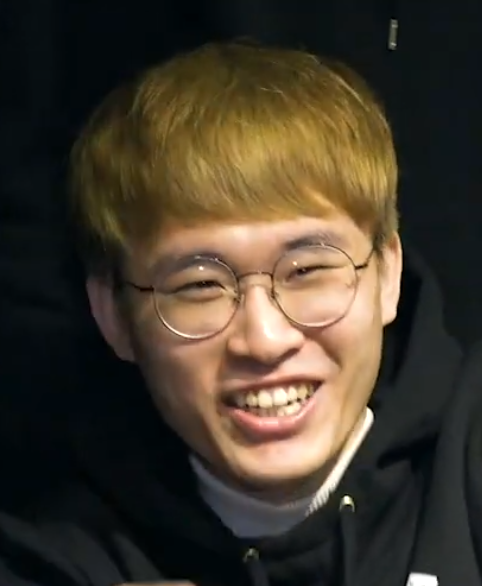
Lee "Stellar" Dohyung

As of September 30, 2022

| Handle | Name | Role | Country | Seasons | Ref. |
|---|---|---|---|---|---|
| AimGod | Minseok Kwon | Support | South Korea | 2018–2019 | |
| alemao | Renan Moretto | Support | Brazil | 2019 | |
| Avast | Connor Prince | Support | United States | 2018 | |
| Axxiom | Minseob Park | Tank | South Korea | 2019–2020 | |
| blasé | Jeffrey Tsang | Damage | United States | 2019 | |
| brussen | Thomas Brussen | Tank | Netherlands | 2020 | |
| Colourhex | Kelsey Birse | Damage | New Zealand | 2019–2021 | |
| Crimzo | William Hernandez | Support | Canada | 2022–present | |
| DreamKazper | Jonathan Sanchez | Damage | United States | 2018 | |
| Faith | Honggyu Kim | Support | South Korea | 2021–present | |
| Fusions | Cameron Bosworth | Tank | United Kingdom | 2019–2021 | |
| GaeBullSsi | Young-sun Yun | Tank | South Korea | 2021 | |
| Gamsu | Young-Jin Noh | Tank | South Korea | 2018 | |
| Halo | Haley Hamand | Support | United States | 2020 | |
| im37 | Jinui Hong | Damage | South Korea | 2021 | |
| Jerry | Tae-Hee Min | Damage | South Korea | 2020 | |
| Kalios | Wooyeol Shin | Tank | South Korea | 2018 | |
| Kellex | Kristian Keller | Support | Denmark | 2018–2019 | |
| Mag | Taesung Kim | Tank | South Korea | 2022–present | |
| Marve1 | Minseo Hwang | Tank | South Korea | 2022–present | |
| MCD | Jeongho Lee | Support | South Korea | 2022–present | |
| mikeyy | Michael Konicki | Tank | United States | 2020 | |
| Mistakes | Stanislav Danilov | Damage | Russia | 2018 | |
| Mouffin | Wadil Bassal | Tank | Canada | 2020 | |
| Munchkin | Sangbeom Byun | Damage | South Korea | 2020 | |
| Myunbong | Sangmin Seo | Support | South Korea | 2020–2021 | |
| Neko | Sehyeon Park | Support | South Korea | 2018 | |
| NotE | Lucas Meissner | Tank | Canada | 2018–2019 | |
| Persia | Zion Yang | Support | South Korea | 2019 | |
| Punk | Leyton Gilchrist | Tank | Australia | 2020–present | |
| rCk | Richard Kanerva | Tank | Finland | 2019 | |
| Seeker | Alex Taylor | Tank | Canada | 2022–present | |
| Snow | Mikias Yohannes | Support | Ethiopia | 2018 | |
| Stand1 | Jiwon Seo | Tank | South Korea | 2021 | |
| Stellar | Dohyung Lee | Damage | South Korea | 2019 | |
| Striker | Namjoo Kwon | Damage | South Korea | 2018, 2022 | |
| Swimmer | Gabriel Levy | Support | United States | 2020 | |
| Valentine | Byeongju Kim | Damage | South Korea | 2021–present | |
| Victoria | Gihun Oh | Damage | South Korea | 2022–present | |
