= Supertf =

American professional Overwatch player

Super
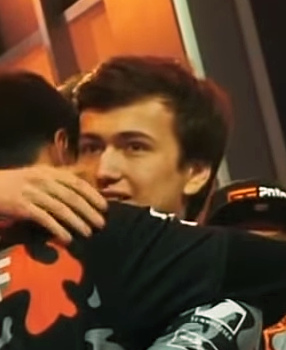
- DeLisi in 2019

Personal information
- Name: Matthew Joseph DeLisi
- Born: March 28, 2000 (age 26)
- Nationality: American

Career information
- Game: Overwatch
- Playing career: 2016–2021, 2023
- Role: Tank
- Number: 1

Team history
- 2016–2017: -bird noises-
- 2017: Hammer Esports
- 2017: Luminosity Gaming Evil
- 2018–2021: San Francisco Shock

Career highlights and awards
- 2× OWL champion (2019, 2020); OWL Role Star (2019); 2× OWL All-Star (2019, 2020); OWWC champion (2019)

Twitch information
- Channel: supertf
- Years active: 2016–present
- Followers: 755 thousand

YouTube information
- Channel: supertf
- Subscribers: 397 thousand
- Views: 200 million
- Last updated: February 22, 2026

Matthew Joseph DeLisi (born March 28, 2000), better known as Super or Supertf (stylized in all lowercase), is an American Twitch streamer, YouTuber, and former professional Overwatch player. He competed in the Overwatch League (OWL) as a member of the San Francisco Shock. Prior to his time in OWL, DeLisi played for teams including -bird noises-, Hammer Esports, and Luminosity Gaming Evil (LGE).

DeLisi began his professional Overwatch career in 2016 with -bird noises- and then later joined Hammer Esports in 2017—which was acquired by LGE that year. In late 2017, he signed with the San Francisco Shock in preparation for the inaugural OWL season in 2018. Initially being underage, DeLisi made his professional debut in April 2018. Throughout his tenure with the Shock, DeLisi achieved numerous accolades, including being a two-time OWL All-Star, an OWL Role Star, an OWL MVP finalist, and a winner of three midseason tournament titles. He also secured two OWL championships in 2019 and 2020, as well as won the 2019 Overwatch World Cup as part of Team USA. DeLisi announced his retirement on March 27, 2022.

DeLisi's prominence extended beyond his gameplay, as he made two appearances on The Tonight Show Starring Jimmy Fallon for interviews about OWL.

== Early life ==
DeLisi was born on March 28, 2000, and was raised in Northeast Philadelphia, Pennsylvania. At a young age, DeLisi watched his brother play RuneScape, which inspired him to play video games. His brother later helped him create an account under the name "Super71000," which DeLisi adopted for "a while" before eventually removing the numbers.

== Professional career ==
=== Early career ===
DeLisi's esports journey began in Team Fortress 2 as a member of -bird noises-. However, the team transitioned to Overwatch shortly after his arrival, where he specialized in playing as the tank hero Reinhardt. In January 2017, -bird noises- was acquired by Hammer Esports, which, six weeks later, merged with Luminosity Gaming to form Luminosity Gaming Evil (LGE). During his time with LGE from January to August, the team achieved notable successes, including winning the CyberPowerPC 2017 Extreme Gaming Series minor, securing second place in the Overwatch Carbon Series major, and qualifying for Overwatch Contenders 2017 Season Zero. LGE disbanded in August 2017 as many players on the roster, including DeLisi and the notable DPS player Jake, were expected to sign with teams in the upcoming Overwatch League (OWL).

=== San Francisco Shock ===
DeLisi joined the San Francisco Shock, the Overwatch League team of NRG Esports based in San Francisco, on September 28, 2017. However, due to age restrictions, DeLisi was unable to compete until March 2018. His Overwatch League debut took place on April 5, 2018, when the San Francisco Shock achieved a 3–1 victory over the Los Angeles Gladiators. With the eligibility of DeLisi and his teammate Jay "sinatraa" Won, the San Francisco Shock experienced an upturn in their performance during the second half of the season, achieving a 11–9 record during that time.

During the initial stages of the 2019 season, the prevailing OWL meta involved a team composition of three tanks and three supports. DeLisi, specializing in playing Reinhardt, showcased exceptional skill in this meta and held the record for the fewest deaths among OWL players at various points throughout the season. The San Francisco Shock, as a team, achieved significant milestones by winning the Stage 2 playoffs and finishing as runners-up in the Stage 1 and Stage 3 playoffs. However, the introduction of a 2-2-2 role lock in Stage 4 altered the team composition meta, leading to DeLisi being benched for the majority of the remainder of the season. DeLisi made a notable appearance in the playoffs, helping the Shock secure victory against the London Spitfire. The Shock ultimately triumphed over the Vancouver Titans in the Grand Finals. DeLisi's performance during the 2019 season earned him several accolades. He was selected as a 2019 All-Star and recognized with a Tank Role Star commendation, which was voted on by OWL general managers, coaches, broadcast talent, and the media. Additionally, DeLisi was a finalist for the 2019 Overwatch League Most Valuable Player award.

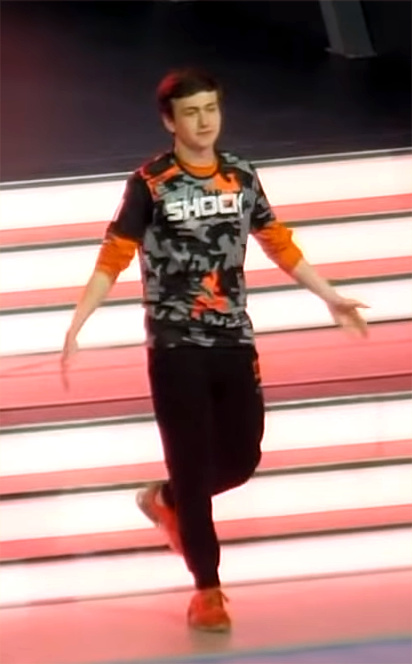
DeLisi at the 2019 Overwatch League Grand Finals

DeLisi faced limited playing time at the start of the 2020 season due to the prevailing use of Orisa and Winston as the primary tank choices in the league. However, he made a significant impact when given the opportunity. The San Francisco Shock reached the finals of the May Melee tournament, where they emerged victorious against the Florida Mayhem, with DeLisi showcasing an aggressive playstyle on various maps. As the meta shifted in the Countdown Cup qualifiers, Genji became a popular damage character. Since the Shock did not have a dedicated Genji player on their roster, DeLisi filled the role in a win against the Boston Uprising. The Shock went on to win the Countdown Cup finals against the Philadelphia Fusion, with DeLisi occasionally subbing in as the team's main tank. Despite his limited playing time, DeLisi's was selected to participate in the North America All-Star Game for the second consecutive season. In the playoffs, the meta shifted again, with Roadhog becoming a prominent tank choice. DeLisi was substituted back into the starting roster, primarily playing as Roadhog throughout the playoffs. The Shock secured their spot in the Grand Finals bracket as the top seed from North America. After defeating the Shanghai Dragons in the upper bracket finals, they faced the Seoul Dynasty in the Grand Finals. DeLisi played a crucial role as Roadhog in the finals, helping the Shock defeat Seoul and secure their second Overwatch League championship.

DeLisi made the decision to retire from professional Overwatch on March 27, 2022, just a month before the start of the 2022 season. He cited the emotional and mental strain caused by the preparation for the upcoming season as the reason for his departure.

== National team career ==
DeLisi represented Team USA in the 2019 Overwatch World Cup (OWWC). Throughout the event, he played as Orisa, a hero he had rarely used in the Overwatch League. Team USA progressed beyond the group stages and faced three-time reigning champions Team South Korea in the semifinals. In a 3–1 victory, they defeated Team South Korea and advanced to the finals against Team China. Team USA dominated the finals with a 3–0 sweep, securing their first OWWC title. This achievement made DeLisi one of four players to win both OWL and OWWC titles.

DeLisi briefly came out of retirement to participate in the 2023 Overwatch World Cup as a member of Team USA. The team reached the quarterfinals of the event, where they were eliminated by Team China by a score of 0–3.

== Esports ambassador ==
After winning their first Overwatch League title, DeLisi and teammate Jay "sinatraa" Won made an appearance on The Tonight Show Starring Jimmy Fallon in October 2019, making them the second and third esports professionals to be featured on the show. Throughout the third season of the Overwatch League, DeLisi emerged as a de facto representative of the league, consistently appearing in OWL interviews and amassing a dedicated fanbase. In October 2020, following the Shock's second OWL championship victory, DeLisi returned to The Tonight Show for a second appearance.

== Awards and nominations ==
=== Professional Overwatch awards ===
Year	Tournament	Award	Team	Ref.
2019	2019 Overwatch League	Tank Role Star	San Francisco Shock	

=== Gaming and streaming awards ===
Year	Ceremony	Category	Result	Ref.
2019	Esports Awards	Esports PC Player of the Year	Nominated	
2021	The Streamer Awards	Best FPS Streamer	Nominated	
2022	The Streamer Awards	Best FPS Streamer	Nominated	
2023	The Streamer Awards	Best FPS Streamer	Nominated	
2025	The Streamer Awards	Best Marvel Rivals Streamer	Nominated	
2026	The Streamer Awards	Best FPS Streamer	Nominated	
2026	The Streamer Awards	Streamer's Choice Award	Won	
2026	The Streamer Awards	Gamer of the Year	Nominated	
