= San Francisco Shock =

American professional esports team

- Founded: July 12, 2017
- Folded: November 8, 2023
- League: Overwatch League
- Region: West
- Team history: San Francisco Shock (2017–2023)
- Based in: San Francisco, California
- Colors
- Owner: Andy Miller
- Head coach: Park "Crusty" Dae-hee
- General manager: Chris "Thugnasty" Chung
- Championships: 2019, 2020
- Main sponsor: ampm
- Parent group: NRG Esports
- Website: Official website

Uniforms

The San Francisco Shock were an American professional Overwatch esports team based in San Francisco, California. The Shock competed in the Overwatch League (OWL) as a member of the league's West region. Founded in 2017, the San Francisco Shock was one of the twelve founding members of the OWL and was one of three professional Overwatch teams in California. The team was owned by Andy Miller, co-owner of the Sacramento Kings and NRG Esports. In their time with the OWL, the Shock won three midseason tournament titles, qualified for four season playoffs, reached the Grand Finals three times, and won back-to-back Grand Finals, making them one of the most accomplished franchises in Overwatch League history.

== Franchise history ==
=== Beginnings ===
On July 12, 2017, Overwatch developer Activision Blizzard officially announced that Andy Miller, co-founder and co-owner of the American esports organization NRG Esports, had acquired a San Francisco-based Overwatch League franchise spot for an estimated $20 million. "The local aspect of the league was the biggest attraction [for purchasing the spot]," said Miller in an interview. "One of the biggest issues with esports, and also part of its charm, is that you can create a global audience. You can have fans all over the world. But it’s always become a big challenge for fans to actually see their favorite teams. You have to fly to a major event or a finals somewhere in a major city. And there was never a hometown team."

On September 28, 2017, NRG Esports announced its official inaugural roster of eight players and head coach Bradford Rajani. A month later, on October 16, the franchise name was revealed as the San Francisco Shock.

=== 2018: Inaugural season ===
In the lead-up to the 2018 Overwatch League season, the San Francisco Shock assembled a 9-player roster that included two underage players, damage player Jay "Sinatraa" Won and tank player Matthew "Super" DeLisi. However, due to age restrictions, they were unable to participate until March. The team's inaugural match took place on January 10, 2018, resulting in a 0–4 defeat against the Los Angeles Valiant. The Shock encountered early challenges but made key additions to their roster on March 13, signing damage player Park "Architect" Min-ho and support player Grant "Moth" Espe. Later on, they completed their roster by adding tank player Choi "ChoiHyoBin" Hyo-bin. Following these acquisitions, the Shock's performance witnessed an upturn, with Sinatraa and Super becoming eligible to play. They achieved a commendable 6–4 record in Stage 3, narrowly missing out on the playoffs due to a tiebreaker. Seeking further improvements, the team decided to part ways with head coach Rajani and signed Park "Crusty" Dae-hee, the former head coach of the Boston Uprising, who had led his previous team to a flawless 10–0 record in Stage 3. As the season progressed, the Shock managed to secure victories in half of their remaining matches, finishing the regular season in ninth place with a 17–23 overall record.

=== 2019–2020: Back-to-back championships ===
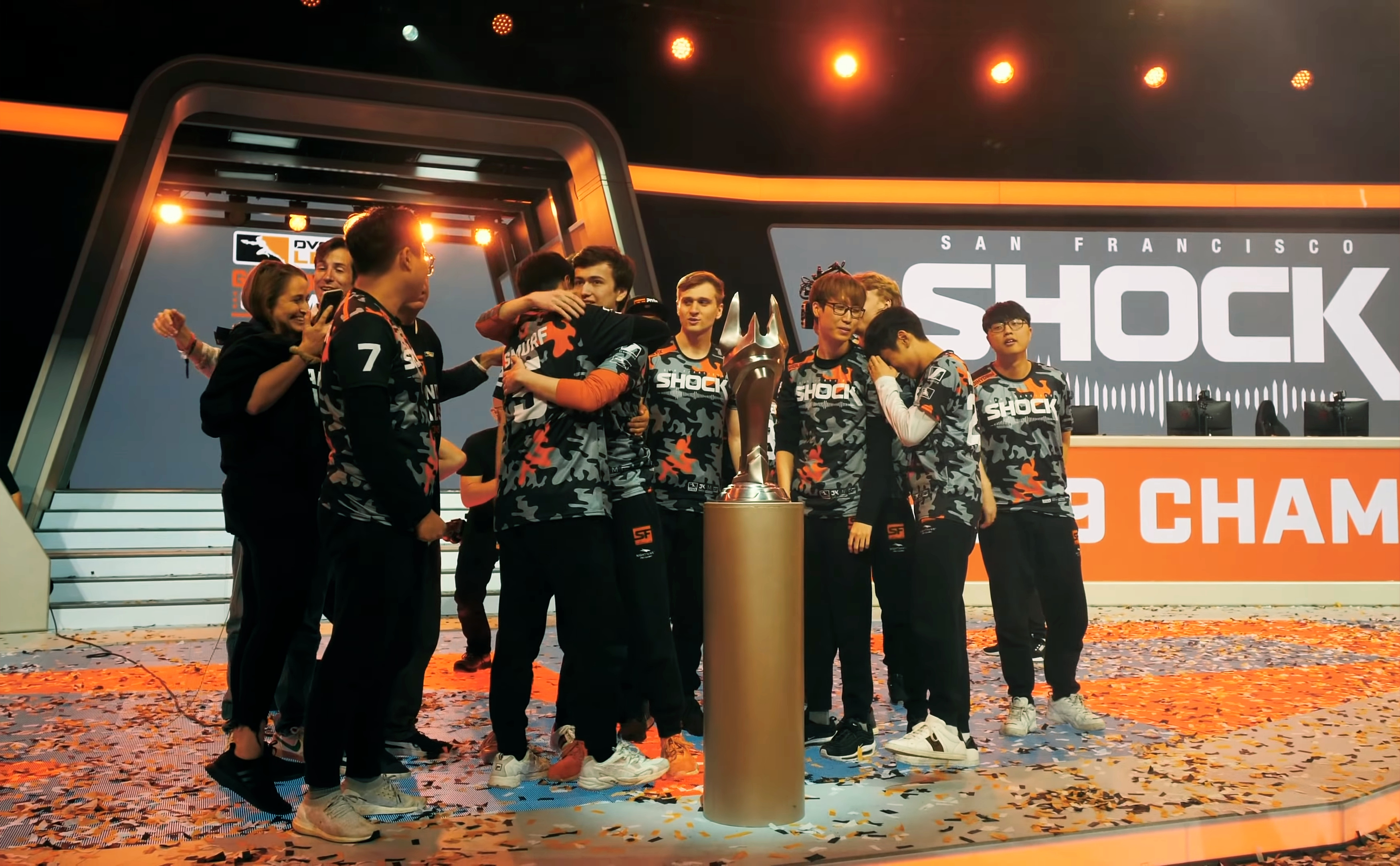
The Shock won the 2019 OWL championship.

In the offseason leading up to the 2019 Overwatch League season, the San Francisco Shock made several significant additions to their roster. They acquired tank player Yoo "Smurf" Myeong-hwan through a trade, parting ways with Dante "Danteh" Cruz in the process. The team also bolstered their support role by signing Park "Viol2t" Min-ki. Furthermore, the Shock added damage player Gwon "Striker" Nam-ju, who had previously played for the Boston Uprising.

During the first stage of the season, the San Francisco Shock performed well, finishing with a 4–3 record and securing the sixth seed in the Stage 1 Playoffs. In the playoffs, they faced the undefeated Vancouver Titans in the Stage 1 finals. Led by standout performances from Super and ChoiHyoBin, the Shock put up a strong fight and even held a 3–2 lead at one point. However, they narrowly lost the match by a score of 3–4. The team found their stride in Stage 2, achieving an unprecedented perfect stage with a flawless 7–0 record and 28–0 map record. This feat made them the first team in Overwatch League history to accomplish a perfect stage. As the top seed in the Stage 2 Playoffs, the Shock once again met the Vancouver Titans in the finals. With key contributions from Super, ChoiHyoBin, and Viol2t, the Shock emerged victorious, defeating the Titans by a score of 4–2. In Stage 3, the Shock reached the playoff finals yet again, this time facing the Shanghai Dragons. However, they were unable to secure the victory, losing the match by a close 3–4 scoreline. Nevertheless, the Shock finished the regular season with a seven consecutive wins, concluding with a 23–5 record, the second-best in the league. This secured them the third seed in the season playoffs. Several players from the Shock received recognition for their performances throughout the season. Sinatraa, Super, ChoiHyoBin, and Moth received Role Star commendations, while Sinatraa and Super were nominated for the league's Most Valuable Player award. Ultimately, Sinatraa claimed the MVP title.

San Francisco faced the sixth-seeded Atlanta Reign in the first round of the 2019 season playoffs, which followed a double-elimination format. In a tightly contested match, the Shock suffered a narrow 3–4 loss, dropping them to the lower bracket of the playoffs. The Shock went on a run through the lower bracket. They displayed dominant performances, sweeping the London Spitfire, the Los Angeles Gladiators, the Hangzhou Spark, and the New York Excelsior. With these victories, the Shock secured their spot in the 2019 Grand Finals. The San Francisco Shock swept the Vancouver Titans 4–0, securing the 2019 Overwatch League championship title. Key points in the match included Architect's strategic Bastion positioning on Eichenwalde and ChoiHyoBin's crucial ultimate on Sigma during overtime on Watchpoint: Gibraltar. ChoiHyoBin's performance earned him the Grand Finals MVP award.

In the 2020 season, the San Francisco Shock introduced a new color scheme, transitioning from their previous orange, grey, and gold colors to black and silver, with orange accents, paying homage to the Oakland Raiders. As they prepared for the 2020 season, the Shock brought in sniper specialist Lee "Ans" Seon-chang.

In the 2020 season, the San Francisco Shock underwent several roster changes. Following a 5–2 start, Sinatraa retired from competitive Overwatch to pursue a career in Valorant. Three weeks later, Architect was transferred to the Hangzhou Spark, and the Shock signed flex support player Lee "Twilight" Joo-seok. The Shock won their franchise's second midseason tournament title on May 24, 2020, after defeating the Florida Mayhem in the North American May Melee finals, 4–2. Despite a loss to the Paris Eternal in the semifinals of the Summer Showdown, the Shock continued their strong performance and clinched the top seed in the Countdown Cup, ultimately winning the tournament by defeating the Philadelphia Fusion in the finals. With a regular season record of 18 wins, 7 bonus wins from midseason tournaments, and 3 losses, the Shock finished with an effective regular season record of 25–3. Ans, ChoiHyoBin, and Viol2t received Role Star commendations, and ChoiHyoBin and Viol2t were nominated for the league's Most Valuable Player award. while ChoiHyoBin and Viol2t were also nominated for the league's most valuable player award.

In the North America playoffs bracket, the San Francisco Shock emerged victorious against the Washington Justice, the Atlanta Reign, and the Philadelphia Fusion to advance to the Grand Finals bracket. They faced the Seoul Dynasty in the first round, where they took a 2–0 lead but allowed the Dynasty to tie the series. However, the Shock prevailed in the final map to advance. In the upper finals, they faced the Shanghai Dragons, again taking a 2–0 lead before the Dragons equalized. The Shock secured their place in the Grand Finals match by winning the final map. On October 10, they faced the Seoul Dynasty in the Grand Finals, and the Shock claimed a 4–2 victory to win their second consecutive Overwatch League championship. Striker was named the Grand Finals MVP.

=== 2021–2023 ===
In the offseason preceding the 2021 season, the Shock made several roster changes, including the departures of Moth and Ans and the signings of support player Brice "FDGoD" Monscavoir and damage player Charlie "nero" Zwarg. Through the first half of the season, the Shock had a 7–1 regular season record, but they were unable to make either of the season's first two interregional tournaments, the May Melee and June Joust, falling in the regional knockouts both times. Prior to the start of the third tournament cycle, the Summer Showdown, Striker retired from competitive Overwatch. The same day that Striker's retirement was announced, the Shock signed Ans back to the team. San Francisco ended the regular season with a 12–4 record but were unable to make it to any of the four midseason tournaments. The Shock qualified for the season playoffs after taking down the Toronto Defiant on September 5 in the Western play-in tournament. In the first round of the playoffs, the Shock lost to the top-seeded Shanghai Dragons, 0–3, on September 21. Falling to the lower bracket after the loss, San Francisco defeated the Philadelphia Fusion and Chengdu Hunters in the following days. Their season came to an end in the following match, as they lost to the Atlanta Reign, 1–3.

After the 2021 Overwatch League season, the San Francisco Shock made significant changes to their roster, retaining only Viol2t while parting ways with the rest of the team. They introduced five rookies to their lineup, including Jung "Kilo" Jin-woo, Kim "Proper" Dong-hyun, Samuel "s9mm" Santos, Colin "Coluge" Arai, and Oh "FiNN" Se-jin. The Shock started their 2022 season with a 3–0 victory over the Paris Eternal. In the Kickoff Clash tournament, the team went undefeated in the qualifiers and secured the top seed position. However, they lost to the Fuel in the lower bracket. Before the Midseason Madness tournament, the team signed Michael "mikeyy" Konicki. The Shock maintained an unbeaten record in the qualifiers, advancing as the top seed. Although they reached the finals, they fell short against the Los Angeles Gladiators. The team then set a new OWL record for the most consecutive regular season wins during the Summer Showdown, winning 20 matches in a row, spanning back to the 2021 regular season. Their undefeated streak was broken by the Fuel on September 2, 2022, marking their first regular season loss of the season. With a 5–1 record in the qualifiers, the Shock advanced to the Western Summer Showdown tournament as the second seed. However, they lost to the Fuel in the finals. Prior to the end of the regular season, the Shock re-signed Striker, who had been a part of the Shock's championship seasons in 2019 and 2020. The team finished the regular season as the second seed in the Western region. Proper received numerous accolades for his performance in the regular season, being commentated as a Role Star for damage, being named the Alarm Rookie of the Year, and earning the Most Valuable Player award. The Shock lost in their first match in the playoffs against the sixth-seeded Houston Outlaws and were sent to the lower bracket. From there, San Francisco made a run through the lower bracket to reach the 2022 Grand Finals. The Shock faced the Fuel in the Grand Finals match. The match went to seven maps; San Francisco lost by a score of 3–4.

The Shock failed to qualify for the 2023 playoffs in the last season of the Overwatch League.

== Team identity ==
On October 16, 2017, the San Francisco brand was officially unveiled. The franchise name was revealed as San Francisco Shock. The team's logo features a seismograph in the shape of the San Francisco–Oakland Bay Bridge in the team's colors of orange, grey, and gold. The name "Shock" and the logo were chosen to represent the large amounts of seismic energy that are present in the San Francisco area. The color gold was chosen to honor the 1849 California Gold Rush that swept the city. "We took great care to choose a logo and identity that would both represent the attributes and traditions of San Francisco, yet at the same time speak to the future of sports and the Shock’s ambitions to take its place as a fixture next to the Bay Area’s championship sports teams," Andy Miller, CEO of NRG Esports, said in a statement. Prior to the 2020 season, the colors were changed to black, silver, and orange, with the black and silver paying tribute to the Oakland Raiders.

=== NRG Shock ===
After the Overwatch League folded, all participating organizations were allowed to use their branding they used in the league on their own, as the trademarks were transferred to them. On May 31, 2024, NRG would sign the orgless North American team Students of the Game during the Overwatch Champions Series (OWCS) Dallas Major, with the team playing as NRG Shock. The team would have its own branding with elements reminiscent of the original San Francisco Shock. NRG Shock would leave Overwatch following the 2024 World Finals, losing in 4th place to the Toronto Defiant, but the branding would resurface in 2026 as NRG entered Marvel Rivals; NRG Shock would be considered the organization's "hero shooter" division after the move.

== Personnel ==
=== Current roster ===
San Francisco Shock roster
Players	Coaches
Role / No. / Handle / Name / Nationality	Head coach: Vacant
Legend: (I) Inactive; (S) Suspended; (2W) Two-way player; Substitute; (injured) Injury / Illness	Latest roster transaction: October 15, 2023.

=== Head coaches ===
Handle	Name	Seasons	Record	Notes	Ref.
Sephy	Bradford Rajani	2018	12–18 (.400)	Released after 30 games in 2018.	
Crusty	Park Dae-hee	2018–2023	86–29 (.748)		

== Awards and records ==
=== Seasons overview ===
Season	P	W	L	W%	Finish	Playoffs
2018	40	17	23	.425	4th, Pacific	Did not qualify
2019	28	23	5	.821	2nd, Pacific	OWL Champions, 4–0 (Titans)
2020	21	18	3	.857	2nd, North America	OWL Champions, 4–2 (Dynasty)
2021	16	12	4	.750	4th, West	Lost in Lower Round 3, 1–3 (Reign)
2022	24	20	4	.833	2nd, West	Lost in Grand Finals, 3–4 (Fuel)
2023	16	8	8	.500	7th, West	Did not qualify

=== Individual accomplishments ===
Season MVP

- sinatraa (Jay Won) – 2019
- Proper (Kim Dong-hyun) – 2022

Grand Finals MVP

- ChoiHyoBin (Choi Hyo-bin) – 2019
- Striker (Kwon Nam-joo) – 2020

Rookie of the Year

- Proper (Kim Dong-hyun) – 2022

Role Star selections

- Moth (Grant Espe) – 2019
- sinatraa (Jay Won) – 2019
- Super (Matthew DeLisi) – 2019
- ChoiHyoBin (Choi Hyo-bin) – 2019, 2020
- Ans (Lee Seon-chang) – 2020
- Viol2t (Park Min-Ki) – 2020

All-Star Game selections

- Architect (Park Min-ho) – 2018
- sleepy (Nikola Andrews) – 2018
- sinatraa (Jay Won) – 2019
- super (Matthew DeLisi) – 2019, 2020
- Viol2t (Park Min-Ki) – 2019, 2020
- Ans (Lee Seon-chang) – 2020
- ChoiHyoBin (Choi Hyo-bin) – 2020
- Moth (Grant Espe) – 2020

== Academy team ==
On February 26, 2018, the Shock formally announced their academy team would compete under the "NRG Esports" name for Overwatch Contenders North America. They also revealed the team would live, train, and play in Washington, D.C., operating under a training home provided by partners Events DC.

On May 8, 2019, NRG Esports announced that the organization would no longer field an Overwatch Contenders roster.

=== Seasons overview ===
Year	Season	Region	OWC regular season				OWC playoffs	Interregional
Year	Season	Region	Finish (Note: Placements in 2018 reflect standings in the team's respective group and not the entire region.)	Wins	Losses	Win %	OWC playoffs	Interregional
NRG Esports
2018	1	North America	4th	3	2	.600	Quarterfinals	
2018	2	North America	3rd	3	2	.600	Semifinals	None held
2018	3	North America	3rd	3	2	.600	Quarterfinals	None held
2019	1	North America West	5th	3	4	.429	Semifinals	
Regular season record				12	10	.545		
Playoff record				2	4	.333		
