= Andy Miller (businessman) =

American lawyer

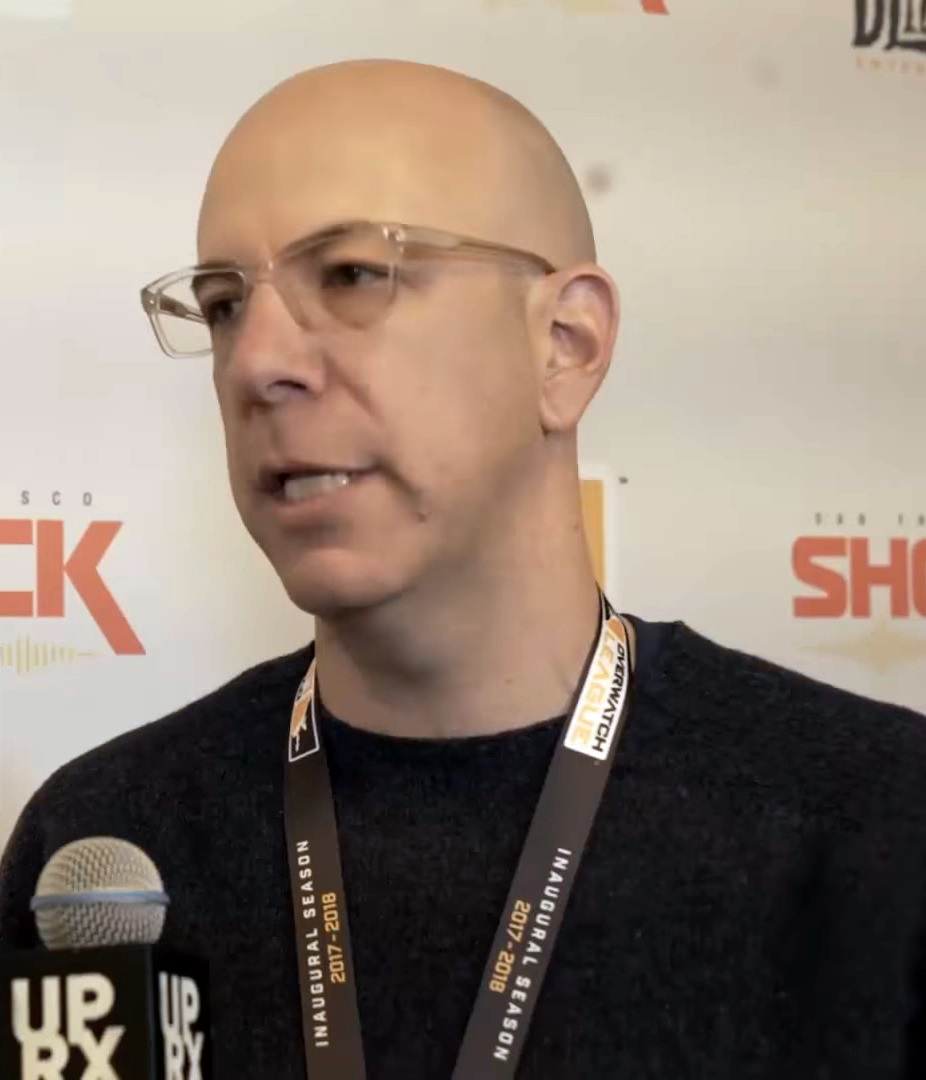
- Born: December 14, 1968 (age 57); Boston, Massachusetts, U.S.
- Education: Union College (BA); Boston College (JD)
- Occupation: Entrepreneur
- Title: CEO of NRG Esports

Andrew D. Miller (born December 14, 1968) is an American businessman and technology/sports entrepreneur. He was formerly the vice president for mobile advertising at Apple Inc. As of 2015, Miller is a co-owner of the Sacramento Kings of the National Basketball Association (NBA), chairman and co-owner of NRG Esports, co-owner of the Modesto Nuts, a Single-A affiliate in Minor League Baseball of the Seattle Mariners of Major League Baseball (MLB), co-founder of Remix Media, Inc. and its app Spun, as well as co-founder of start-up vehicle StartingFive.

== Career ==
After graduating from law school he worked for a law firm based in Boston but was later laid off due to the recession of the 1990s. From 2003 to 2006 he served as Senior Vice President for Business Development at Verisign.

In 2006, he co-founded and ran mobile ads company Quattro Wireless. In late 2009, he sold Quattro Wireless to Apple for $275 million, joining Apple at the same time and reporting directly to Steve Jobs, leaving in late 2011. From 2011 to 2014 he was a partner with Highland Capital Partners. He then became president and chief operating officer at Leap Motion until April 7, 2014. After leaving Leap Motion he created a start-up called Remix Media Inc. In November 2015 Miller co-founded a professional video gaming esports team called NRG Esports with Sacramento Kings co-owner Mark Mastrov. NRG owned and operated the San Francisco Shock, one of the 20 franchised teams in Activision Blizzard's Overwatch League before the league was dissolved in 2023. In November 2017, Miller continued his involvement with esports and became an investor for a mobile esports company called Skillz as part of the company's Series C funding round.

== Personal life ==
He was born in Boston and attended Lexington High School in Lexington, Massachusetts, in 1968. He graduated with a BA from Union College in 1990. He received a JD from the Boston College School of Law in 1993.
