= 2019 Overwatch League Grand Finals =

2019 Overwatch League championship match

2019 OWL Grand Finals
| Vancouver Titans | San Francisco Shock |
| 0 | 4 |
- Date: September 29, 2019
- Venue: Wells Fargo Center, Philadelphia, Pennsylvania
- Purse: $1.7 million
- Attendance: 11,000+
- MVP: Choi "ChoiHyoBin" Hyo-bin

Live Broadcast
- Broadcasts: Global: ESPN; Overwatch League; Twitch; United States: ABC; Canada: TSN; China: Zhanqi; NetEase CC; Bilibili; Huya; France: Mediawan; Germany: Sport1; Russia: Eterra TV

The 2019 Overwatch League Grand Finals was the second championship series of the Overwatch League (OWL), which took place on September 29, 2019. The series was the conclusion of the 2019 Overwatch League playoffs and was played between the Vancouver Titans and San Francisco Shock at the Wells Fargo Center in Philadelphia, Pennsylvania.

Vancouver qualified for the season playoffs as the top seed and defeated the Seoul Dynasty, Los Angeles Gladiators, and New York Excelsior all in the upper bracket of the playoffs. San Francisco qualified as the third seed and was defeated in the first round by the Atlanta Reign but went on to defeat the defending champions London Spitfire, Los Angeles Gladiators, Hangzhou Spark, and New York Excelsior in the lower bracket.

The Shock swept the Titans, 4–0, in the Grand Finals to win their first OWL championship.

== Road to the Grand Finals ==
The Grand Finals are the post-season championship series of the Overwatch League (OWL), a professional international esports league; the teams of the Grand Finals compete for a $1.7 million prize pool, where the winners receive $1.1 million. The 2019 season was the second in OWL history and consisted of twenty teams in two divisions. Each team played 28 matches throughout the regular season. The playoffs were contested by eight teams – the two teams with the best regular season record in each division, the following four teams with the best regular season record, regardless of division, and the top two teams from the play-in tournament.

The finalists, Vancouver and San Francisco, had the top two 2019 regular season records at 25–3 and 23–5, respectively. The Titans claimed the top seed of the season playoffs as the Pacific Division champions, while the Shock were awarded the third seed, behind the Atlantic Division champions New York Excelsior. The two teams faced each other four times throughout the 2019 season – in the Stage 1 and 2 Finals and twice in the regular season. The teams split their two matches in the regular season, Vancouver won the Stage 1 title, and San Francisco won the Stage 2 title; additionally, the teams have an even 11–11 map record against the other in those four matches. The defending OWL champions, London Spitfire, were eliminated in the first round of the losers bracket of the playoffs, while the runners-up, Philadelphia Fusion, failed to qualify for the 2019 playoffs after being eliminated in the play-in tournament.

=== Vancouver Titans ===
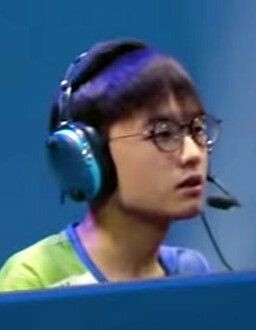
Haksal won the OWL rookie of the year

The Titans entered the 2019 season as one of eight expansion teams with a roster consisting primarily of the members of Korean Contenders team RunAway.

Vancouver started the season with a 4–0 sweep over the Shanghai Dragons. The team ended Stage 1 with a perfect 7–0 record and went on to win the Stage 1 Finals against the Shock. The Titans posted another perfect 7–0 record in Stage 2; however, they lost in the Stage 2 Finals against the Shock, which ended their Overwatch League record 19-game win streak (including playoffs). The team continued their regular season dominance by winning an Overwatch League record 19 consecutive games that was not snapped until on June 23, when the Los Angeles Valiant defeated the Titans. While they qualified for the Stage 3 playoffs, Vancouver was defeated by the Shanghai Dragons in the semifinals round. The Titans lost two more times in the regular season, against the Washington Justice and San Francisco Shock, to end the regular season with a league-best 25–3 record and the top seed in the season playoffs. Kim "Haksal" Hyo-jong and Lee "Twilight" Ju-seok were awarded the Role Star commendation for DPS and support, respectively; Haksal was also named the OWL Rookie of the year. Twilight and tank Choi "Jjanu" Hyeon-woo were finalists for the league's most valuable player award, but the Shock's Jay "sinatraa" Won won the award.

Vancouver faced the eighth-seeded Seoul Dynasty in the first round of the playoffs, winning 4–2 after claiming three straight map victories. Advancing to the first round of the winners bracket, the team took down the fifth-seeded Los Angeles Gladiators by a 4–2 score. In the Winners' Finals, Vancouver faced the New York Excelsior; the match went to seven maps, as the two teams traded map wins throughout. The Titans came out on top with a 4–3 victory to advance to the Grand Finals.

=== San Francisco Shock ===
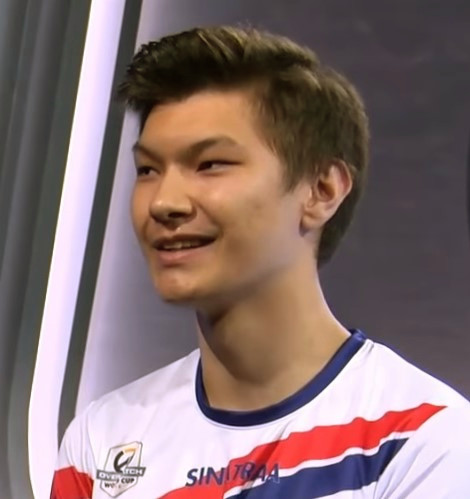
Sinatraa won the OWL Most Valuable Player award

San Francisco entered the league in 2018 as one of the twelve founding franchises. Looking to qualify for their first stage or season playoffs, the team made several roster additions in the preceding offseason of the 2019 season, including acquiring main tank Yoo "Smurf" Myeong-hwan from the Houston Outlaws, promoting Kim "Rascal" Dong-jun from their academy team NRG Esports, signing Park "Viol2t" Min-ki from Korean Overwatch Contenders team O2 Ardeont, and acquiring DPS Kwon "Striker" Nam-joo from the Boston Uprising.

The Shock's first match of the 2019 regular season resulted in a 4–0 sweep over the Dallas Fuel. The team followed the win by splitting the next six matches to finish Stage 1 with a 4–3 record and the sixth seed in the Stage 1 Playoffs. The team made it to the Stage 1 Finals, but they fell to the Titans. San Francisco hit their stride in Stage 2, as the team completed the "perfect stage" with a 7–0 record and 28–0 map record. Qualified as the top seed in the Stage 2 Playoffs, the Shock defeated the Titans in the Stage 2 Finals. San Francisco dropped two matches in Stage 3, against the Houston Outlaws and Chengdu Hunters, and fell to the Shanghai Dragons in the Stage 3 Finals. The team finished the regular season with seven straight wins to post a 23–5 record, the second best in the league, and the third seed in the season playoffs. Jay "Sinatraa" Won, Matthew "super" DeLisi, Choi "ChoiHyoBin" Hyo-bin, and Grant "Moth" Espe were awarded the Role Star commendation for DPS, tank, tank, and support, respectively. Both Sinatraa and super were nominated for the league's most valuable player award, which Sinatraa won for his ability to flex onto a multitude of different heroes and hold his own as a championship team member.

San Francisco faced the sixth-seeded Atlanta Reign in the first round of the season playoffs, but the team fell in a heartbreaking 3–4 loss to drop to the losers bracket. The Shock responded to the loss by pulling off a dominant run in losers bracket; the team swept the London Spitfire in the first round, the Los Angeles Gladiators in the second round, the Hangzhou Spark in the third round, and the New York Excelsior in the losers finals to secure a spot in the Grand Finals.

=== Summary of results ===
Qualified playoffs teams
| Seed | Team | Division | Record | MR | MD |
|---|---|---|---|---|---|
| 1 | Vancouver Titans | PAC | 25–3 | 89–28–0 | +61 |
| 2 | New York Excelsior | ATL | 22–6 | 78–38–3 | +40 |
| 3 | San Francisco Shock | PAC | 23–5 | 92–26–0 | +66 |
| 4 | Hangzhou Spark | PAC | 18–10 | 64–52–4 | +12 |
| 5 | Los Angeles Gladiators | PAC | 17–11 | 67–48–3 | +19 |
| 6 | Atlanta Reign | ATL | 16–12 | 69–50–1 | +19 |
| 7 | London Spitfire | ATL | 16–12 | 58–52–6 | +6 |
| 8 | Seoul Dynasty | PAC | 15–13 | 64–50–3 | +14 |

San Francisco Shock
| Round | Opponent | Score |
|---|---|---|
| First Round | (6) Atlanta Reign | 3–4 |
| Lower Round 1 | (7) London Spitfire | 4–0 |
| Lower Round 2 | (5) Los Angeles Gladiators | 4–0 |
| Lower Round 3 | (4) Hangzhou Spark | 4–0 |
| Lower Round 4 | (2) New York Excelsior | 4–0 |

Vancouver Titans
| Round | Opponent | Score |
|---|---|---|
| First Round | (8) Seoul Dynasty | 4–2 |
| Upper Round 1 | (5) Los Angeles Gladiators | 4–2 |
| Upper Round 2 | (2) New York Excelsior | 4–3 |

== Venue and ticketing ==
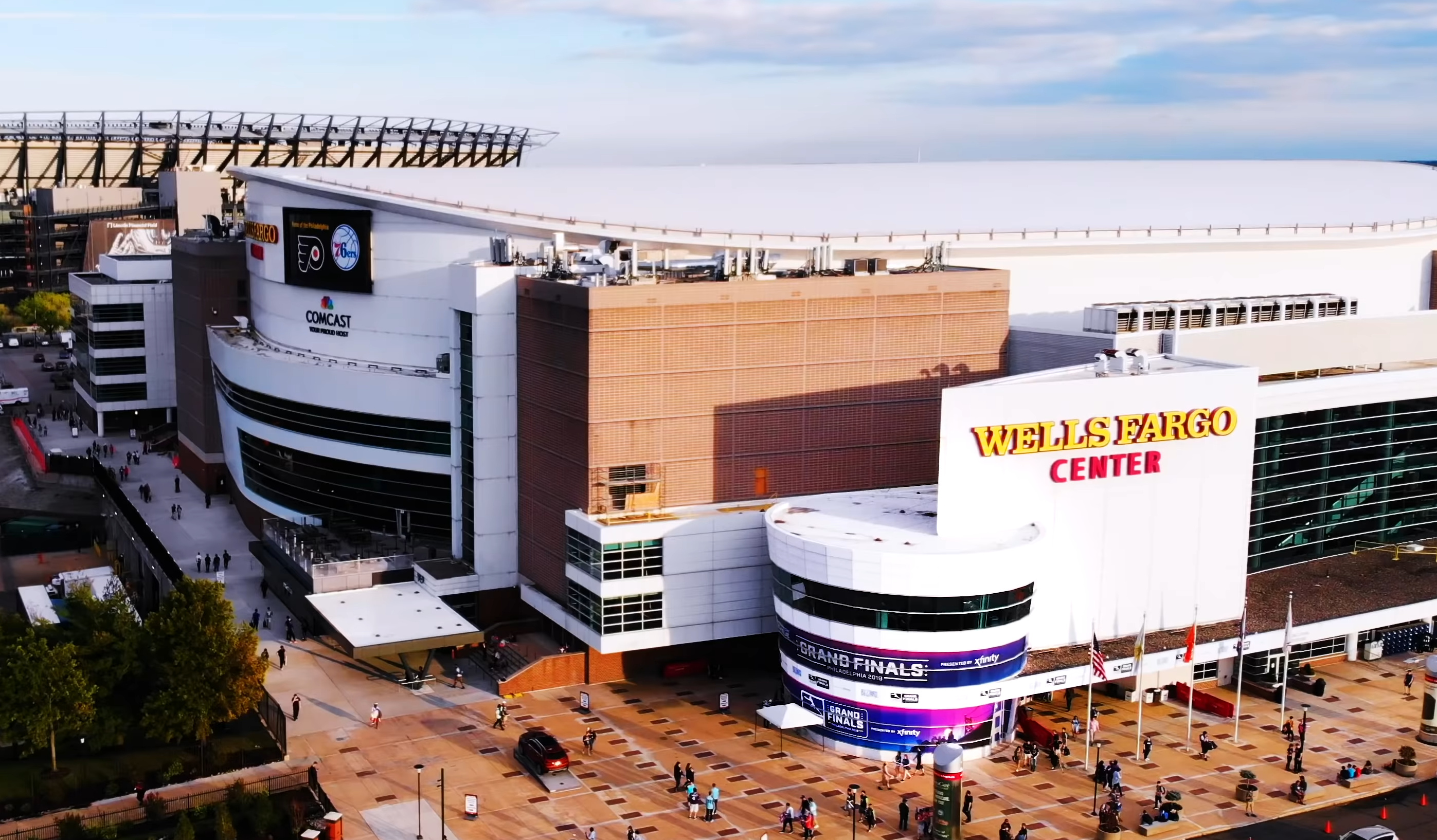
Wells Fargo Center decorated for the Grand Finals

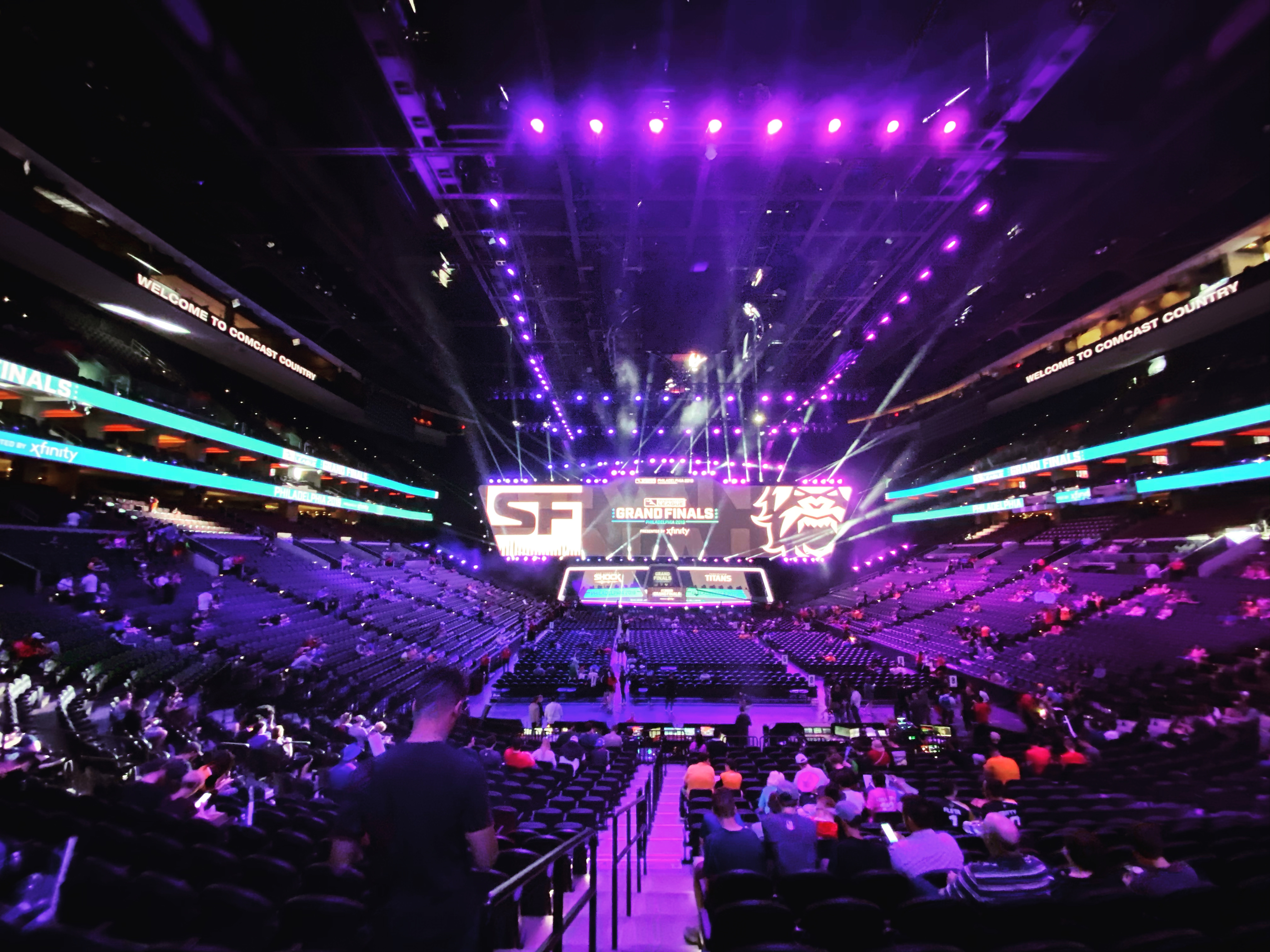
Inside Wells Fargo Center prior to the Grand Finals

The Wells Fargo Center in Philadelphia was announced as the 2019 OWL Grand Finals host venue on May 8, 2019. Overwatch League commissioner Nate Nanzer noted that the league chose Philadelphia because it is a "legendary sports town with amazing fans." Originally called Spectrum II, Wells Fargo Center opened in 1996 at a cost of $210 million and has a seating capacity of 21,000. It is the home arena of the Philadelphia Flyers of the National Hockey League (NHL), the Philadelphia 76ers of the National Basketball Association (NBA), the Philadelphia Soul of the Arena Football League (AFL) and the Philadelphia Wings of the National Lacrosse League (NLL). The arena has been the site of a number of other notable events, including the 1997 and 2010 Stanley Cup Finals, the 2001 NBA Finals, various collegiate events for the National Collegiate Athletic Association (NCAA), the 2000 Republican National Convention, the 2016 Democratic National Convention, and multiple concerts and WWE events.

Ticket sales for the finals, including upgrade packages which feature early entry, Overwatch League merchandise, free parking, and access to an Overwatch meet-and-greet available to additional cost, began on June 7, 2019. The approximately 12,000-seat venue was sold out for the final event.

== Broadcast and viewership ==
The Grand Finals were live-streamed on Twitch in 190 countries, and were also available to stream on the ESPN app and the Overwatch League's website and app. The match was broadcast in the United States on ABC; the finals were also available in the following countries via the following platforms:

- Canada – TSN
- China – Zhanqi, NetEase CC, Bilibili, Huya
- France – Mediawan
- Germany – Sport1
- Russia – Eterra TV

The estimated viewership across television and streaming drew about 1.12 million viewers per minute, a 16% increase over the 2018 Grand Finals.

== Entertainment ==
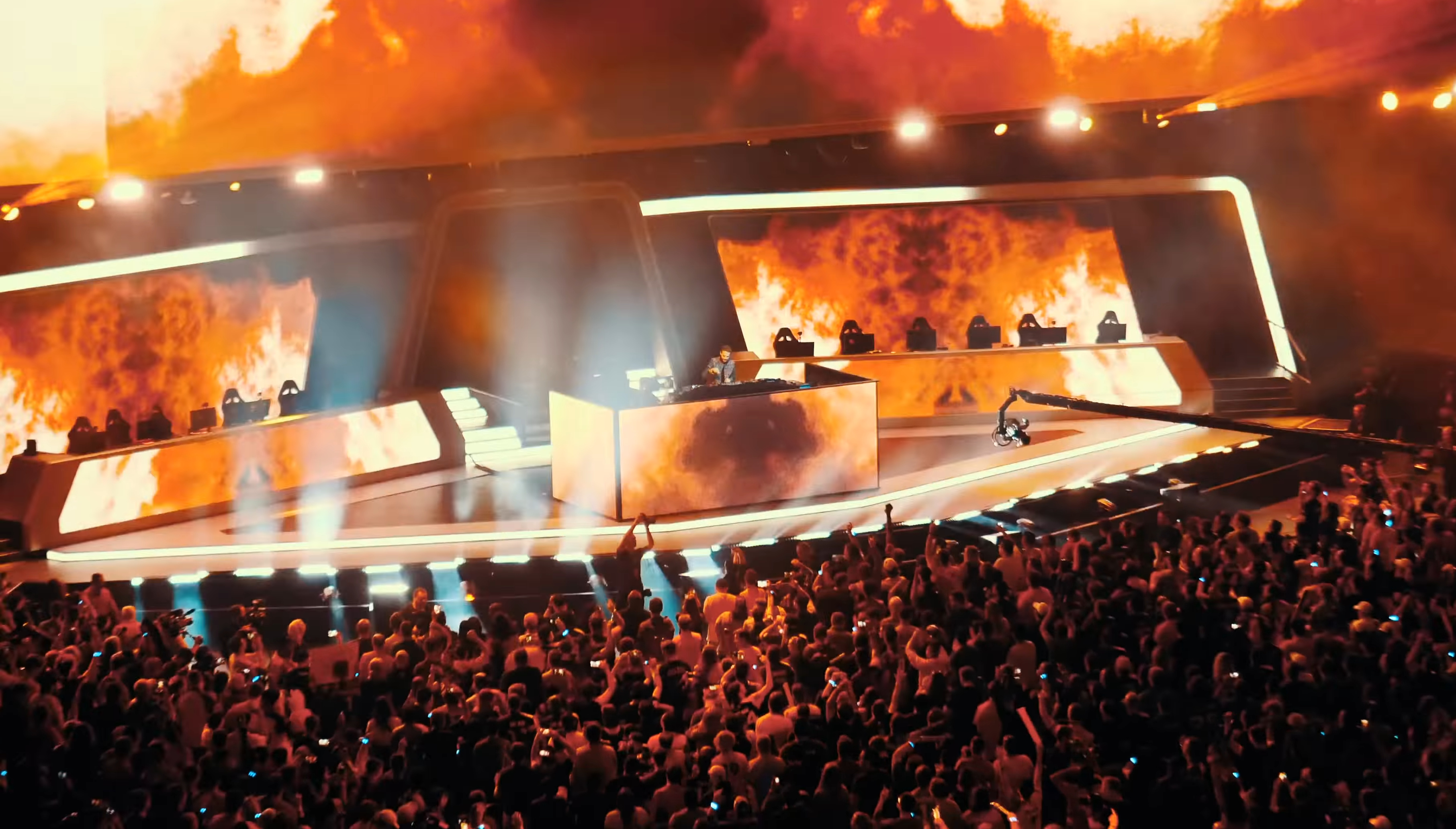
Zedd performed for the 2019 Grand Finals Opening Ceremony.

Several artists and DJs performed prior or during the Grand Finals match. EDM artist Martin Garrix, with guests Matt Ox and PAZ, headlined an outdoor concert at the Wells Fargo Center complex the day prior to the finals. DJ Ghost performed in the parking lot of the Wells Fargo Center the morning of the Finals. Musician, music journalist, and Philadelphia native Questlove performed during tournament breaks.

=== Opening ceremony ===
On September 12, the OWL announced that record producer, DJ, and songwriter Zedd would perform during the Grand Finals Opening Ceremony. A short clip of a new unreleased pink and blue Widowmaker skin featuring the Zedd logo was aired at the beginning of the performance. The show featured mixes of "Stay The Night", "Clarity", "Stay", "The Middle", and a special guest performance by R&B singer Kehlani performing "Good Thing". The show was well received by fans – a stark contrast to the 2018 Opening Ceremony performance by DJ Khaled during the 2018 Grand Finals.

== Match summary ==
The Grand Finals were to be played as a first-to-four series of matches. Vancouver, as the higher seed entering the match, had the selection of which specific map was to be played from the available pool in the first round. Each subsequent map choice was given to the losing team from the previous map, while the winning team from the previous match chose whether they would like to attack or defend first, if applicable.

| Grand Finals | September 29 | San Francisco Shock | 4 | – | 0 | Vancouver Titans | Philadelphia, PA |
| | 3:00 pm EDT | Details | | | | | Wells Fargo Center |
| | | 2 | Lijiang Tower | | | 0 | |
| | | 4 | Eichenwalde | | | 3 | |
| | | 4 | Temple of Anubis | | | 3 | |
| | | 3 | Watchpoint: Gibraltar | | | 2 | |

=== Map 1: Lijiang Tower ===
| SFS | Control map | VAN |
|---|---|---|
| 100% | Round 1 | 31% |
| 100% | Round 2 | 97% |

| | Lineup |
|---|---|---|
| Striker | Damage role | SeoMinSoo |
| sinatraa | Damage role | Haksal |
| smurf | Tank role | TiZi |
| ChoiHyoBin | Tank role | JJANU |
| Viol2t | Support role | Twilight |
| Moth | Support role | SLIME |

As the higher seed in the matchup, the Titans selected control map Lijiang Tower – a map that Vancouver has been historically good on – to open the match. The Shock came out strong and took first control of the point. Stellar teamwork and effective ultimate management kept San Francisco rolling throughout the round, but the Titan's eventually took control of the point after the Shock had 93% of the capture. However, in the next team fight, the Shock rolled through the Titans defenses to take back control and win the round.

In round two, the Titans came out on top of the first team fight and took first control. Vancouver held the point throughout multiple team fights, highlighted by an effective ultimate combination between Choi "JJANU" Hyeon-woo on Sigma and Kim "Haksal" Hyo-jong on Doomfist. After claiming 65% of the point, the Titans finally lost control. The two teams traded point captures throughout the remainder of the round; the Shock eventually sealed a win in the second round, largely due Shock Jay "sinatraa" Won's dominant play as Doomfist.

=== Map 2: Eichenwalde ===
| SFS | Hybrid map | VAN |
|---|---|---|
| 3 | Checkpoints | 3 |
| 55.5% | Capture progress | 55.4% |
| 0:00 | Time remaining | 0:00 |

| | Lineup |
|---|---|---|
| Rascal | Damage role | SeoMinSoo |
| Architect | Damage role | Haksal |
| smurf | Tank role | TiZi |
| ChoiHyoBin | Tank role | JJANU |
| Viol2t | Support role | Twilight |
| Moth | Support role | SLIME |

For the hybrid map, Vancouver selected Eichenwalde; the Shock subbed out damage players sinatraa and Kwon "Striker" Nam-joo for Park "Architect" Min-ho and Kim "Rascal" Dong-jun to play as a Bastion/Mei combo. San Francisco attacked first and were able to capture the first point on their first attempt. As the map moved to the escort potion, the Shock did not lose a team fight as they captured the second point with over four minutes in the time bank. As the payload was escorted though the final phase of the map, Rascal used Mei's ice walls helping to both protect and elevate Architect's Bastion to give him high ground. Notably, Architect had managed to get Bastion up onto one of the chandeliers that hung near the end of the map and, subsequently, prevented the Titans from challenging the final capture from this tactical position. The Shock finished the map with 2:49 in the time bank.

For their defense, the Shock opted to defend with Rascal on Pharah, while Architect remained on Bastion. The Titans responded well, and through a lengthy team fight, they were able to capture the first point and began escorting the payload. Vancouver was met early in the escort phase, but Seo "SeoMinSoo" Min-soo on Reaper dispatched the Shock. The team's momentum continued throughout the second phase of the map, as the Titan captured the second point without losing a team fight. The Shock were able to stop the Titans in the first fight of the third phase, but the Titans came back in full force and finished the map with 2:47 in their time bank.

As both teams completed the map, the map went to overtime rounds; Vancouver attacked first. The Titans were unable to capture any progress on the point after a sloppy first team fight, but a much stronger second attack nearly secured them the first point. However, a well-timed Rocket Barrage by Rascal's Pharah ended the Titans attack with 55.4% of progress on the first point. On San Francisco's attack, they were held up under the choke point for an extended amount of time, but the team was able to touch the capture area as time ran out to force an overtime timer; a clutch ultimate from Choi "ChoiHyoBin" Hyo-bin on Sigma led to the Shock closing out the map with a win.

=== Map 3: Temple of Anubis ===
| SFS | Assault map | VAN |
|---|---|---|
| 3 | Checkpoints | 3 |
| 33.3% | Capture progress | 0.0% |
| 0:20 | Time remaining | 0:00 |

| | Lineup |
|---|---|---|
| Striker | Damage role | SeoMinSoo |
| sinatraa | Damage role | Haksal |
| smurf | Tank role | TiZi |
| ChoiHyoBin | Tank role | JJANU |
| Viol2t | Support role | Twilight |
| Moth | Support role | SLIME |

Coming out of halftime, the Titan's chose assault map Temple of Anubis for the match's third map; the Shock brought sinatraa and Striker back in for Rascal and Architect. The Titans attacked first and were able to capture the first point on their first attempt. After a few failed attempts, the Titans finally broke through the Shock's second point defenses and, after a lengthy stagger delay from the Shock, finished the map with 1:34 remaining.

On defense, the Titans focused on shutting down sinatraa's Doomfist, and found some success, as they were able to hold of the Shock's first and second attacks. However, the Shock finally broke through the Titan defense as the timer ran out and captured the first point in overtime. San Francisco carried that momentum into the second point and won the first team fight to finish the map with 2:12 in their time bank.

The Titans had the first attack in overtime rounds; after getting shut down multiple times, Haksal's Doomfist created an opening for the Titans to take the first point with less than 15 second remaining. With only time for one more attack, the Titan's failed to capture the second point. The Shock responded on their attack by taking the first point on their first attempt. Striker found an early pick as the Shock attacked the second point, but Vancouver was able to recover and held back the Shock. San Francisco responded by taking down Vancouver in the next team fight and took their third map win.

=== Map 4: Watchpoint: Gibraltar ===
| SFS | Escort map | VAN |
|---|---|---|
| 3 | Checkpoints | 2 |
| 0.00 m | Distance pushed | 76.53 m |
| 1:52 | Time remaining | 0:00 |

| | Lineup |
|---|---|---|
| Architect | Damage role | SeoMinSoo |
| Rascal | Damage role | Haksal |
| smurf | Tank role | TiZi |
| ChoiHyoBin | Tank role | JJANU |
| Viol2t | Support role | Twilight |
| Moth | Support role | SLIME |

With the Shock at match point, Vancouver chose to take the match to escort map Watchpoint: Gibraltar. The Shock once again subbed out sinatraa and Striker for Rascal and Architect. Defending first, Vancouver overcame the Bastion/Mei composition run by San Francisco in the first team fight right at the beginning of the map; however, the Shock struck back by winning the following team fight with 2:20 remaining. The team carried that momentum throughout the first phase of the map and to reach the first checkpoint. The Shock found little resistance in the second phase of the map; a great Gravitic Flux from ChoiHyoBin's Sigma took the Shock to the second checkpoint. With over four minutes remaining, the Shock began the third phase of the map. A well-timed Death Blossom from SeoMinSoo's Reaper momentarily held the Shock from completing the map, but San Francisco came right back and completed the map with 1:52 remaining.

Vancouver struggled to push the payload to the first checkpoint on their attack, largely due to Rascal's strong Pharah performance. With under 30 second left in the map, JJANU found a couple of eliminations that propelled the Titans to the first checkpoint. Vancouver found an easier, albeit still difficult, time pushing the payload to the second checkpoint. Beginning with JJANU getting picked by being out of position, the Titans could not find a footing in the final phase of the map. With Architect as Bastion on the high ground defending the final checkpoint of the map, the Shock held the Titans from completing the map and claimed a 4–0 sweep.

== Rosters ==
=== San Francisco Shock ===
2019 San Francisco Shock roster
Players
Coaches

| Role | No. | Handle | Name | Nationality |
|---|---|---|---|---|
| Damage | 2 | sinatraa | Won, Jay | United States |
| Damage | 3 | Architect | Park Min-ho | South Korea |
| Damage | 7 | Striker | Kwon Nam-joo | South Korea |
| Damage | 27 | Rascal | Kim Dong-jun | South Korea |
| Tank | 1 | super | DeLisi, Matthew | United States |
| Tank | 5 | smurf | Yoo Myeong-hwan | South Korea |
| Tank | 9 | Nevix | Karlsson, Andreas | Sweden |
| Tank | 11 | ChoiHyoBin | Choi Hyo-bin | South Korea |
| Support | 17 | Viol2t | Park Min-ki | South Korea |
| Support | 64 | Moth | Espe, Grant | United States |

Head coach

- Park Dae-hee

Legend:
- (I) Inactive
- (S) Suspended
- (2W) Two-way player
- Substitute
- (injured) Injury / Illness

Latest roster transaction: April 19, 2019.

=== Vancouver Titans ===
2019 Vancouver Titans roster
Players
Coaches

| Role | No. | Handle | Name | Nationality |
|---|---|---|---|---|
| Damage | 1 | Haksal | Kim Hyo-jong | South Korea |
| Damage | 9 | Hooreg | Lee Dong-eun | South Korea |
| Damage | 18 | SeoMinSoo | Seo Min-soo | South Korea |
| Damage | 22 | Stitch | Lee Chung-hee | South Korea |
| Tank | 4 | Bumper | Park Sang-beom | South Korea |
| Tank | 40 | TiZi | Hwang Jang-hyeon | South Korea |
| Tank | 14 | JJANU | Choi Hyeon-woo | South Korea |
| Support | 7 | Twilight | Lee Joo-seok | South Korea |
| Support | 11 | Rapel | Kim Jung-geun | South Korea |
| Support | 28 | SLIME | Kim Sung-jun | South Korea |

Head coach

- Hwang Ji-sub

Legend:
- (I) Inactive
- (S) Suspended
- (2W) Two-way player
- Substitute
- (injured) Injury / Illness

Latest roster transaction: August 16, 2019.
