= ChoiHyoBin =

South Korean professional Overwatch player

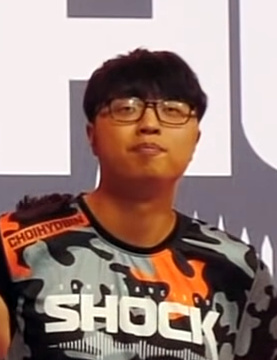
- Choi in 2019

Personal information
- Name: 최효빈 (Choi Hyo-bin)
- Nationality: South Korean

Career information
- Game: Overwatch
- Playing career: 2017–2021
- Role: Tank
- Number: 11

Team history
- 2017–2018: X6-Gaming
- 2018–2021: San Francisco Shock

Career highlights and awards
- 2× OWL champion (2019, 2020); OWL Grand Finals MVP (2019); 2× OWL Role Star (2019, 2020); OWL All-Star (2020); OWC Korea champion (2018)

Choi Hyo-bin (Korean: 최효빈), stylized mononymously as ChoiHyoBin, is a South Korean former professional Overwatch player. He began his career playing with team X6-Gaming, where he won the first Overwatch Contenders Korea championship. Choi signed with the San Francisco Shock for the inaugural season of the Overwatch League (OWL). He won two OWL championships with the Shock, in 2019 and 2020, and was named the 2019 Grand Finals most valuable player.

== Professional career ==
=== X6-Gaming ===
Choi began his Overwatch career with Korean team X6-Gaming in 2017, where he competed in multiple seasons of the OGN APEX series, a premier Overwatch tournament series in South Korea. Choi was part of X6-Gaming's APEX Challengers Season 3 Championship team, where he mainly played as the tank character D.Va.

=== San Francisco Shock ===
On April 5, 2018, Choi was picked up by the San Francisco Shock of the Overwatch League. Signed in the middle of the 2018 season, he made his OWL debut on May 24, 2018, in a 2–3 loss to the London Spitfire.

In the 2019 season, Choi started as one of the team's tank players, mainly playing as D.Va. The team went on to win the Stage 2 Playoffs after a win over the Vancouver Titans. Throughout the regular season, Choi had the sixth-least average deaths per minute among all tank players. Throughout the 2019 postseason, Choi mainly played as Sigma. The team fell to the Atlanta Reign in the first match of the playoffs, dropping them to the lower bracket of the tournament; after four consecutive wins in the lower bracket, the Shock made it to the 2019 Overwatch League Grand Finals, where they faced the Vancouver Titans. Up to that point in the postseason, Choi had the second-most eliminations among all players, averaging 22.96 elimination per 10 minutes. In the Grand Finals match, the Shock swept the Titans, 4–0, and Choi was named the 2019 Grand Finals Most Valuable Player.

In the 2020 season, Choi alternated between playing D.Va and Sigma, due to the league introducing hero pools, a weekly system where characters are banned from play; Choi won two midseason tournaments with the Shock – the May Melee and the Countdown Cup. Choi was nominated for the league's regular season most valuable player award and selected to play in the 2020 All-Star Game. Additionally, Choi was awarded a 2020 Role-Star commendation, marking the first time that a player has earned two such awards two years in a row. Choi won his second OWL Grand Finals after the Shock defeated the Seoul Dynasty in the 2020 Overwatch League Grand Finals.

Following the 2021 season, Choi retired from competitive Overwatch.

Awards and achievements
Preceded by Park "Profit" Joon-yeong	OWL Grand Finals MVP; 2019	Succeeded by Kwon "Striker" Nam-joo
