= Striker (gamer) =

South Korean professional Overwatch player

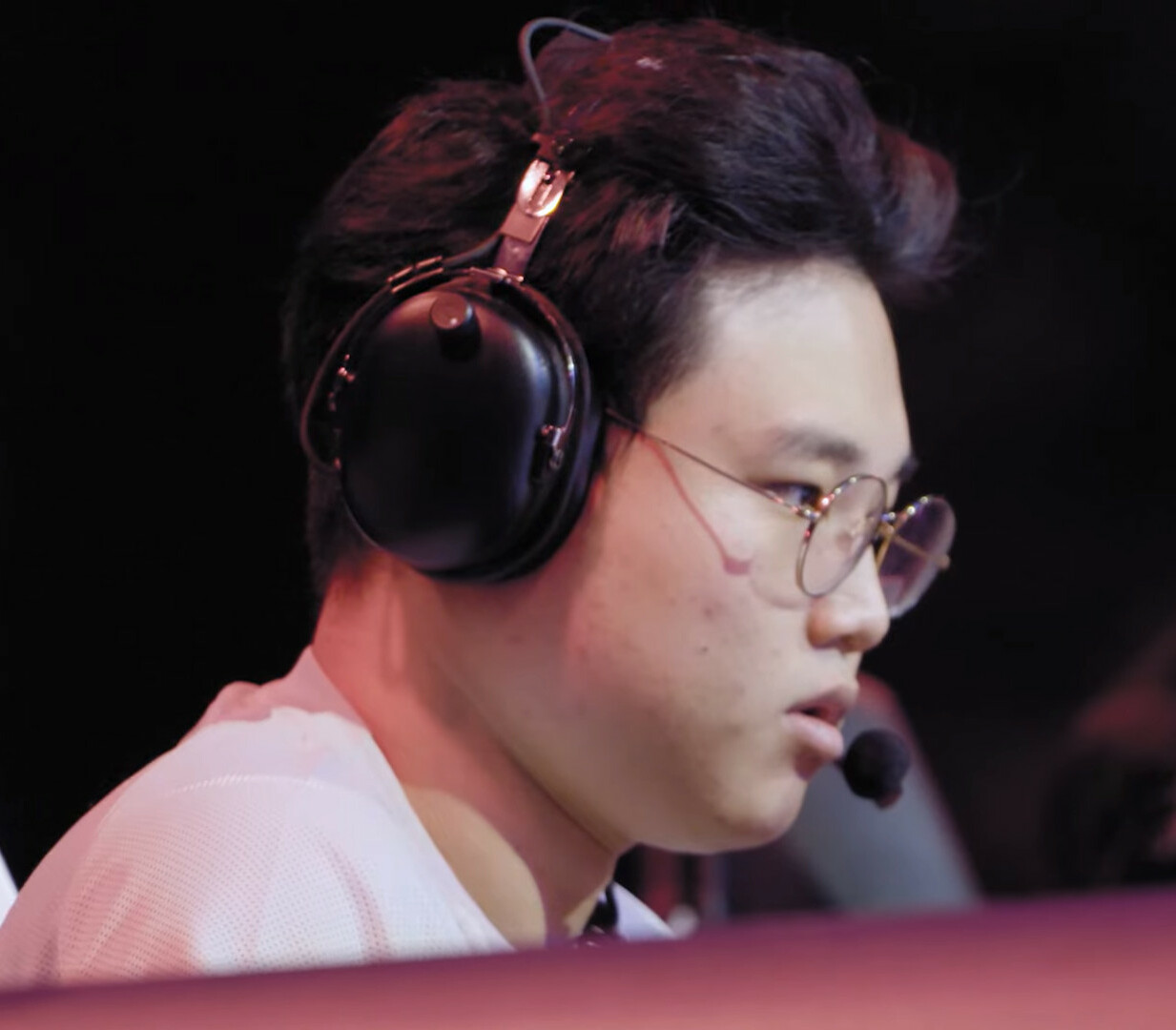
- Kwon in 2022

Personal information
- Name: 권남주 (Kwon Nam-joo)
- Born: 1999 or 2000 (age 26–27)
- Nationality: South Korean

Career information
- Game: Overwatch
- Playing career: 2017–present
- Role: Damage

Team history
- 2017: ROX Orcas
- 2018: Boston Uprising
- 2019–2021: San Francisco Shock
- 2022: Boston Uprising
- 2022: San Francisco Shock
- 2023: Boston Uprising
- 2023: San Francisco Shock

Career highlights and awards
- 2× OWL champion (2019, 2020); OWL Grand Finals MVP (2020); OWL All-Star (2018)

Kwon Nam-joo (Korean: 권남주), better known by his online alias Striker, is a South Korean professional Overwatch player. He began his Overwatch career playing for South Korean team ROX Orcas in Overwatch Apex. Kwon signed with the Boston Uprising ahead of the Overwatch League (OWL) inaugural season. After one season with the Uprising, Kwon was traded to the San Francisco Shock. In his time with the Shock, he won two Overwatch League championships, in 2019 and 2020, and was named the 2020 Grand Finals' most valuable player. Kwon retired from professional Overwatch in mid-2021; however he came out of retirement a few months later. He signed with the Uprising for the 2022 season but was released after only a few weeks into the season. Later that season, he signed back with the Shock and reached the 2022 Grand Finals with the team. The following year, he again joined the Uprising, and midway through the season, he again left the team and joined the Shock.

== Professional career ==
=== Early career ===
Kwon began his Overwatch career playing for ROX Orcas in the fourth season of the South Korean Overwatch Apex Challenger series. His team finished in fourth place, promoting them to the Overwatch Apex series. However, the team finished near the bottom of the standings.

=== Boston Uprising ===
Kwon was signed to the Boston Uprising for ahead of the inaugural season of the Overwatch League. Following the suspension of Boston damage player Jonathan "DreamKazper" Sanchez early in Stage 3 of the 2018 season, Kwon took over the starting damage position on the team. Throughout Stage 3, Kwon had the highest Tracer rating in the league and accounted for 30.5% of his team's kills — also the highest in the league. The Uprising did not lose a single match in the stage, going 10–0, to become the first team to go undefeated in a stage. Prior to the start of Stage 4, Overwatch underwent a balancing update, as well as the introduction of the new hero Brigitte, which significantly reduced Kwon's effectiveness on Tracer. At the end of the regular season, Kwon accounted for 27% of his teams kills when playing as Tracer and 33% of his team's kills when playing as Pharah. He also had the most "Fleta Deadlifts," an OWL statistic referring to when a player accounts for more than half of a team's final blows on a map, in the 2018 season at seven. As of the end of the 2021 season, this is the most Fleta Deadlifts by any player in the league's history. At the end of the season, Kwon named a 2018 All-Star reserve.

=== San Francisco Shock ===
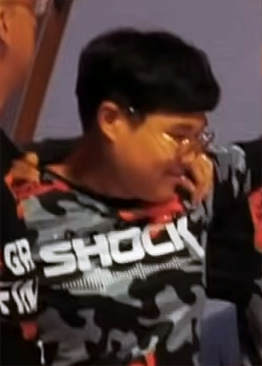
Kwon won the 2019 and 2020 OWL Grand Finals with the Shock.

Prior to the 2019 season, Kwon was transferred to the San Francisco Shock, reuniting him and former Uprising head coach Park "Crusty" Dae-hee, who was the head coach of Boston through the first three stages of the 2018 season. Kwon did not play much in the first three stages of the 2019 season, although he made an appearance in the Stage 3 finals against the Shanghai Dragons. After the implementation of a role lock by the league in Stage 4 onwards, Kwon found more playtime. In the 2019 season playoffs, Kwon found playing time on the hero Reaper; in all of the playoff matches before the finals, Kwon was ranked in the top three in all major statistical categories on Reaper. The Shock played in 2019 Overwatch League Grand Finals on September 29, 2019; although Kwon sustained injuries to his left hand and leg prior to the match, he competed in the match. Kwon played in two of the four maps in the finals, as the Shock went on to defeat the Vancouver Titans, 4–0.

He and the Shock reached the 2020 Grand Finals, where they defeated the Seoul Dynasty by a score of 4–2 on October 10, 2020. Playing mainly as Tracer, Kwon accounted for 72 final blows, a statistic referring to when a player lands the final shot that kills an opponent, in the match, won the Grand Finals Most Valuable Player award, and won his second OWL title in as many years.

On June 23, 2021, the Shock announced that Kwon had retired from professional Overwatch.

=== Return to the Uprising ===
In October 2021, Kwon returned to the Overwatch League, signing with the Uprising for the 2022 season. After being a starter for the team throughout the first few matches, he was benched in favor of teammate Gi-hun "Victoria" Oh on May 21. Two days later, Kwon was released from the Uprising.

=== Return to the Shock ===
On September 29, 2022, the Shock announced that Kwon had been signed back to the organization for the remainder of the 2022 season. He played in the 2022 Grand Finals as a starter but lost the match against the Dallas Fuel.

=== Third stint with the Uprising ===
Kwon joined the Boston Uprising, for the third time, prior to the 2023 season. After the Uprising failed to qualify for the Midseason Madness tournament, Kwon parted ways with the team.

=== Third stint with the Shock ===
Kwon joined the San Francisco Shock, for the third time, midway through the 2023 season.

Awards and achievements
Preceded by Choi "ChoiHyoBin" Hyo-bin	OWL Grand Finals MVP; 2020	Succeeded by Lee "LIP" Jae-won
