= Characters of the Overwatch franchise =

A promotional image of the 51 playable characters that were playable by Overwatch's 10th anniversary.

The Overwatch franchise, a series of first-person shooter games developed by Blizzard Entertainment, consists of 54 playable characters across both games as of October 2026. The original 2016 game, Overwatch, featured 21 playable characters known as heroes and several supporting characters as part of the game's narrative, which is told through animated media and digital comics outside of the game. Its sequel, Overwatch 2, was released in October 2022 and replaced Overwatch. However, as Overwatch 2 had been developed to be a faster game with five-versus-five teams rather than six-versus-six, several of the characters had tweaks or major rebuilds within Overwatch 2, as well as different character designs. Overwatch 2 was rebranded in February 2026 as simply Overwatch with an increased focus on developing narratives and heroes to support the ongoing story.

The story of Overwatch takes place on Earth in the "near future" in the years after the "Omnic Crisis", a period in which robots (called "omnics") rose up in rebellion worldwide, and the United Nations formed an elite group called Overwatch to combat them. Overwatch continued to protect the peace until it was disbanded years later under a cloud of suspicion, but its former members have returned to the force in light of new threats to humanity, including the terrorist organization Talon. Blizzard wanted to create a diverse set of characters to reflect a positive outlook on this near future, incorporating non-human characters and non-standard character traits. Besides in-game content, the game's narrative and heroes' background are told through online animation and videos, and both written and graphic novels published by Blizzard.

== Background ==
Overwatch, now completely replaced by Overwatch 2 and later rebranded to Overwatch, was an online team-oriented first-person shooter, and an example of a "hero shooter" where players select from one of several pre-designed hero characters with their own unique abilities. Overwatch included casual play modes, competitive ranked play modes, and various arcade modes with special rules applied to the base play modes. Most game modes featured two six-player teams competing in one of several objective-based game types: Control, assault, payload, and hybrid.

Overwatch 2 retains most of its predecessor's gameplay and content with some changes. People play on two teams of five rather than six players (Note: The change was largely due to the much slower-paced (described as boring) play style that was promoted by having two tanks. This change was also made partly to alleviate the long time to get into a game for people who chose the role of ‘’damage’’ — the ‘’damage’’ role will be further explained below.) and the game type "assault" was removed after much criticism from the player base. Heroes were given new designs, with some of them receiving entirely new abilities.

A match starts with each player selecting from one of the available hero characters. The game's characters are divided into three role classifications: damage, tank, and support. (Note: Patch 1.25 issued in June 2018 merged former "offense" (Doomfist, Genji, Cassidy, Pharah, Reaper, Soldier: 76, Sombra, and Tracer) and "defense" (Bastion, Hanzo, Junkrat, Mei, Torbjörn, and Widowmaker) into a single "damage" role.) Damage characters are often doing the most damage and help the team with the majority of kills. Tank characters can absorb large amounts of damage for the team, and support characters can heal their teammates and provide status effects for the team or against enemies. The game will warn teams if they have an imbalance in their general role selection, and many game modes require players to select a certain amount of heroes from each role. Players are able to switch between heroes mid-match after they are killed or if they return to their team's base.

Each hero character has fundamentally different attributes such as health and movement speed, at least one basic attack, and at least one unique skill, collectively referred to as a skill kit. These skills can be used repeatedly after waiting out the skill's cooldown period. Each character also has at least one powerful ultimate ability that becomes available once its meter is charged, either slowly over time or through other actions such as killing opponents or healing teammates. Once the ultimate ability is used, the player has to wait for the meter to fill again. All characters have a close-combat, low damage melee attack that can be used at any time.

In the original Overwatch, winning matches earned the player experience towards levels in the meta-game. The player earned a loot box on reaching a new experience level, which contained a random assortment of character skins, emotes, voice lines, and other cosmetic items for each character without altering gameplay. Players could also purchase loot boxes with real-world money. Blizzard provided free post-release content for the game, such as new maps and characters. Blizzard also introduced limited-time seasonal events, offering new cosmetic items in loot boxes, themed maps, and gameplay modes. In Overwatch 2, the loot box system was entirely scrapped in favor of a battle pass system. After playing a game, the player would earn points that contributed to their progression in the battle pass, unlocking new cosmetics along the way. At the launch of Overwatch 2, new hero characters could either be acquired through purchase and completion of the battle pass in some seasons, or later by completing specific challenges; since early 2024, Blizzard has scrapped this approach, making all new heroes available to all during specific seasons. Blizzard also brought back loot boxes as means for earning cosmetic items in February 2025, though such loot boxes are only learnable within game or through promotions, and have fixed odds at rare or more exclusive rewards to mitigate gambling concerns. The February 2025 update also saw the introduction of perks, two sets of two skill modifications for each character they can gain during a match. At a new tier level during a match, a player can select one of these predefined perks from the pair.

== Overview ==
Overwatch originally featured 12 characters at its November 2014 BlizzCon convention announcement, but expanded to 21 by the next year's convention. The game is character-driven, and reviewers noted Overwatch's emphasis on the individual differences between characters in the same role (e.g., between two snipers) as a departure from dominant class-based shooter paradigms. Critics widely praised the game's accessible and detailed character design and its role in the game's overall success.

Similar to Valve's initial launch of Team Fortress 2, in the absence of a dedicated story mode, Blizzard tells the backstory of Overwatch's plot and characters through media outside the game, including animated shorts, character press events, tweets, and webcomics. The game's story centers around a technological singularity in which humanity assembles a team of its best heroes, Overwatch, to fight off a rogue artificial intelligence and its robotic army of Omnics in an incident called the "Omnic Crisis". After winning its battle, the Overwatch kept the peace for about three decades before infighting led to its disbandment. The game takes place approximately sixty years in the future, during a time period in which the world is slipping into disarray, and former Overwatch members, along with new allies and enemies, are being called on to help protect the peace in their respective favor. Among Overwatch's enemies are Talon, a global criminal network seeking wealth and power.

With the relaunch of Overwatch 2 as just Overwatch in February 2026, Blizzard aimed to introduce a stronger narrative, with multiple chapters across each year. In the first year of content from this relaunch, "Rise of Talon", Vendetta overthrows Doomfist, the current leader of Talon, to seize control of the organization herself, and changing it from a clandestine operation to a more aggressive one seeking global domination. She sends off her associates to draw in support from other non-aligned groups, including the Deadlock Gang, the Hashimoto clan, the Junkers from Junkertown, and Vishkar Industries, stealing equipment aimed to attack Overwatch.

In early 2016, Blizzard released media kits with granular character detail for fan artists and cosplayers. Preceding the game's launch, PornHub reported a surge in searches for pornography including Overwatch characters. An intellectual property security firm issued multiple takedown requests to sites featuring such videos and other erotica created in Source Filmmaker.

== Development ==
Overwatch was developed by Blizzard following the cancellation of a massively multiplayer online role-playing game Titan, a project that had been in works for several years. A smaller team from those on Titan were given the role to come up with a new project, and they came onto the idea of a first-person shooter that emphasized teamwork, inspired by Team Fortress 2 and the rising popularity of multiplayer online battle arenas, as well as their own development team unity they found to keep their morale high following Titan's cancellation.

The development team settled on a narrative of a near-future Earth setting following a global-scale catastrophic event - the Omnic Crisis, in which robots, known as Omnics, rose up in rebellion against humanity until stopped by a peacekeeping group known as Overwatch. With selection of this global theme, the developers wanted to create a cast of playable characters to portray diverse representations of genders, ages, ethnicities, and nationalities. The heroes include human, transhuman, and non-human characters such as cyborgs, robots, and a talking gorilla. The need for a diverse cast was important to the developers, as some of Blizzard's previous games had been criticized before for missing this mark; Metzen explained that even his daughter had asked him why all the female characters from Warcraft seemed to be only wearing swimsuits. Metzen stated: "Specifically for Overwatch over the past year we've been really cognizant of that, trying not to oversexualize the female characters." Kaplan explained that the industry was "clearly in an age where gaming is for everybody", going on to say that "increasingly, people want to feel represented, from all walks of life, boys and girls, everybody. We feel indebted to do our best to honor that." In addition, Blizzard stated at the 2016 Blizzcon that some of the characters are LGBT, though did not specify which ones at that time. Blizzard has stated that "As with any aspect of our characters' backgrounds, their sexuality is just one part of what makes our heroes who they are." Since then, Tracer has been shown to be in a romantic relationship with another woman through one of the tie-in comics published online by Blizzard. In a subset lore story, Soldier: 76 was also identified as gay, having had a romantic relationship with a man prior to joining Overwatch. A research paper analyzed this announcement and found that players avoided Soldier: 76 afterwards. However, the pick rate returned to previous levels after around three months.

The team envisioned the characters akin to superheroes in this narrative, each with their own abilities, background and personality that could stand on their own, but could also fit into the larger story; this notion translated into the characters being agents for the game, which Metzen said still captures the "heroism and vibe" that superhero stories carry. The team did not want to have any characters that served solely as villains in the game, but did develop some of the characters, like Soldier: 76, to have an uncertain purpose within the narrative.

Several characters were envisioned for the game during its pre-planning stages, but did not make the cut, or were later incorporated into other heroes. Examples of such characters included a jetpack-wearing cat, a hockey player who used rocket-powered skates, and a Russian woman who would ride a bear and, for her ultimate ability, would have the bear rear up and wield his own set of AK-47 rifles. Initially, Reinhardt was an Omnic, but later was settled to be a human character, with the Omnic nature later revisited when the development team crafted Orisa.

Characters introduced since the game's release are generally teased a few weeks in advance or given a cold surprise announcement. The only exception to this had been Sombra, who had been teased by a months-long alternate reality game (ARG) before her formal announcement. Blizzard found that players reacted negatively to this deployment and have opted to avoid this type of prolonged teasing for future characters. Blizzard will still seed upcoming hero characters into the game's announcement media but without making comments towards that, anticipating players would find these before the character is officially announced; for example, the 26th hero Moira had appeared in at least two works before her announcement. Once a character is announced, they are typically made available on the "Public Test Region" (PTR) for Windows players to try out and help provide feedback to Blizzard. Once Blizzard is satisfied with the PTR character, typically a period lasting two to three weeks, the character is then released to all players on all regions and platforms, outside of competitive play, giving players a chance to learn the character. Roughly a week following this, the new character then becomes available for competitive play mode.

Character powers are frequently tweaked and adjusted with patches, mostly incremental changes. A few characters have had major overhauls, notably Symmetra (with two separate overhauls of her skill), Mercy, and Torbjörn. Like new characters, these overhauls are tested in the PTR before being released to all public regions. One notable change in June 2018 reduced the number of roles from four to three (combining "offense" and "defense" heroes into the "damage" category) in the PTR before being released for all players.

Overwatch 2 was announced in November 2019, with plans for both a normal PvP element, as with the original game, and a Player versus Environment (PVE) mode. With the introduction of Echo, the 32nd hero to Overwatch, in March 2020, Kaplan stated that the team's focus was now on Overwatch 2 and it was unlikely they would release any additional heroes before the game's release.

After some delays, including the departure of Kaplan and lead character designer Geoff Goodman, Overwatch 2 was released in open early access with its PvP mode in October 2022, with the PvE mode to come later in 2023. While there was some intent to have a shared multiplayer experience between Overwatch and Overwatch 2 at announcement, Overwatch 2 instead replaced Overwatch entirely; It released as a free to play title, with the player's cosmetics brought over into Overwatch 2. Overwatch 2 was designed to play faster and avoid the slow pace that some Overwatch games had become, in part due to the use of "crowd control" (CC) abilities to hamper progress. To correct this, Overwatch 2 is nominally played with five players on each team, with role-fixed games using two damage, two support, and one tank. This necessitated changes to several characters' skill kits to match; notably, Orisa's kit has a significant rework to remove her shield and her CC abilities, while Doomfist was reworked from damage into a tank class. Overwatch 2 also launched with three new heroes, bringing the total roster to 35 by October 2022. Initially, new heroes for Overwatch 2 were introduced as a free unlock on a seasonal battle pass with a means to acquire them later through other challenges by players that did not purchase the battle pass, but since March 2024, Blizzard has made new heroes available to all players without any purchase.

New characters introduced to the game around 2025, including Hazard and Wuyang, were designed to be more aspirational through personal struggles and challenges, allowing players to connect with characters, according to lead concept artist Daryl Tan. This direction meant that the character design team was moving away from "oddball" characters, like Wrecking Ball and Ramattra, in favor of more conventional designs, according to Tan, but they still plan to introduce more of these unusual characters in the future.

Blizzard rebranded Overwatch 2 as simply Overwatch in February 2026, as well as resetting the season numbering as they shifted to more narrative-driven seasons. Five new heroes were introduced with this rebranding, with an additional hero planned for release in each of the subsequent five seasons.

== Characters ==
=== Tank heroes ===
Tank characters broadly have a high number of hit points and are often at the front line of a team. In the original Overwatch, some tanks had high defensive capability at the cost of lower mobility and offensive capabilities (like Reinhardt), while others exchanged this defensive capability for greater mobility and offensive capabilities (like Wrecking Ball). In Overwatch 2, all tank characters were given upgrades to compensate for going from two teams of six players to two teams of five players, with one tank per team. These upgrades gave all tanks more offensive or defensive capabilities.

==== D.Mon ====
D.Mon, real name Yuna Lee, is a South Korean mecha pilot and former pro gamer. She is the current leader of the Mobile Exo-Force of the Korean Army (MEKA) based in Busan, promoted after D.Va leaves to join Overwatch, and remains close friends with D.Va. She drives a tank-style mecha named "Beast", armed with a plasma sword and an energy shield, along with a shoulder-mounted gun. Whereas D.Va's mech can fly, D.Mon's can charge forward based on a fuel meter to deliver melee strikes. If her mech is destroyed, Lee can eject and run around on foot while waiting to recall her mech, using a minigun to fire on foes. Her ultimate ability from her mech is a large swiping sword swing that applies a debuff to those hit while giving her overshield. Her gameplay design was based on the Armored Core video game series and the Gundam media franchise. D.Mon was introduced in the game in Season 4, in August 2026. She is voiced by Lily "LilyPichu" Ki.

==== D.Va ====
D.Va, real name Hana Song, is a South Korean mecha pilot and former pro gamer from Busan, also a member of the MEKA squad. Though initially MEKA's lead officer, she transferred that to D.Mon to help support Overwatch during and after the Omnic Crisis. D.Va pilots a large mech named "Tokki" (Korean for "rabbit") that is capable of short bursts of movement and limited flight. She can constantly fire fusion cannons along with a short burst of micro-missiles, or can use the mech's defense matrix to briefly absorb all enemy fire it is directed at. If the mech takes too much damage, D.Va ejects and can flee while armed with a pistol until she can call the mech again. She can also eject and cause her mech to self-destruct like a bomb, dealing lethal damage any enemy within line of sight of the explosion. D.Va is voiced by Charlet Chung.

==== Domina ====
Domina, real name Vaira Singhania, is the British Indian heiress of Vishkar Industries and its vice president of operations and development. Her main weapon is a Photon Magnum with high-impact rounds. Using hard light, she can create a temporary, multi-faceted shield, use sonic repulsors to push enemies away and into obstacles to take damage, and create a charged crystal that she can later activate to cause a small explosion. Her ultimate is the Panopticon, a shield that flies forward and encases all nearby foes, within a radius, blocking their damage and healing and preventing external healing sources, exploding when it expires. Domina is voiced by Taj Atwal.

==== Doomfist ====
Doomfist is both the name of the titular cybernetic gauntlet and the title passed down to its wielder, currently the Nigerian-born Akande Ogundimu, a businessman and mixed martial artist-turned mercenary. Doomfist was the head of Talon until he was overthrown by Vendetta. As originally released in Overwatch, Doomfist was classified as a Damage hero, but was reworked to become a Tank hero in Overwatch 2, giving him more health and damage resistance. As a tank in his current kit, Doomfist can use the gauntlet that fires shotgun-like bursts, can be charged up to deliver a powerful punch at foes, or can be used to block damage. He also can jump and lunge a great distance, striking the ground to do a short-range damage strike, and his ultimate allows him to jump out of reach and target a small area for dealing high damage to all enemies within it. Doomfist is voiced by Sahr Ngaujah.

==== Hazard ====
Hazard, real name Findlay Docherty, is a Scottish member of the Phreaks, a punk-like revolutionary group, and outfitted with several illicit cybernetic attachments. His body was inadvertently infused with an unstable form of vanadium during a raid, which gives him crystal-related abilities. Besides firing crystal spikes at foes, he can create a large column of crystals, and absorb damage for a short time and fire it back at the attack. His ultimate pins and damages opponents with crystal spikes. Hazard is voiced by Conor McLeod.

==== Junker Queen ====
Junker Queen, real name Odessa "Dez" Stone, is the new ruler of Junkertown, a ramshackle city in the Australian Outback. While a child, her family was banished from Junkertown, but she came back and competed in "The Reckoning", besting the Junkertown leader and seizing the position for herself. She also oversees the city's combat arena, the Scrapyard, where Wrecking Ball became her champion. Junker Queen's primary weapon is a hit scan shotgun called Scattergun. Through her passive ability Adrenaline Rush, all of her melee attacks deal wound damage that drains enemy health over a short time while healing her. Her Commanding Shout buffs nearby allies with speed and temporary bonus health. Her Jagged Blade ability lashes a throwing knife at a foe that can be recalled by her magnetic fist, causing wound damage to opponents. She can use her Carnage ability to strike with her ax in a heavy melee attack. Her ultimate ability is Rampage, which wounds and debuffs all enemy players it reaches. Junker Queen is voiced by Leah de Niese, except for her lines heard on the Junkertown map, where her voice is provided by Siho Ellsmore.

==== Mauga ====
Mauga, full name Maugaloa Malosi, is a Samoan mercenary and a close companion of Baptiste, introduced in Baptiste's origin story "What You Left Behind". He wields two chain guns that be fired individually or simultaneously, with the effect of igniting foes and then doing critical damage on them. He can also charge forward and end with a ground stomp, damaging and stunning nearby enemies. His ultimate chains enemies within a temporarily field that prevents from escaping and blocks external damage and healing. Mauga is voiced by John Tui.

==== Orisa ====
Orisa is a four-legged centaur-like female Omnic built by 11-year-old robotics prodigy Efi Oladele, to be a "mechanical peacekeeper" of Numbani. While a Tank since Overwatch, her kit underwent significant changes with Overwatch 2. With her current kit, she has a machine gun that briefly stops firing if it overheats, and a javelin that she can either throw at an enemy, or briefly spin quickly to block damage while charging forward. She can also fortify herself to increase damage resistance and neutralize crowd control debuffs, though slows her movement while active. Her ultimate is charged attack that can draw in enemies from around her before she slams the ground and dealing damage to all within range. Orisa is voiced by Cherrelle Skeete.

==== Ramattra ====
Ramattra is an Omnic warrior-monk and the leader of Null Sector, an extremist group that resorts to violent means to achieve Omnic rights. Ramattra has two forms. In his normal Omnic form, he can fire a stream of projectiles from his staff, create a temporarily sheet in front of him, and launch a debuffing vortex that makes enemies vulnerable if they pass through it. Ramattra can switch to his more powerful Nemesis form, using melee punches or blocking damages with his firsts. His ultimate ability is a charged version of his Nemesis form, drawing life energy from all nearby foes that can heal and extended his ultimate timing. Ramattra is voiced by Ramon Tikaram.

==== Reinhardt ====
Reinhardt Wilhelm is a German soldier and adventurer. He was a decorated Bundeswehr veteran from Stuttgart under Colonel Balderich von Alder during the Omnic wars. When Balderich was mortally wounded in defending Eichenwalde, he gave Reinhardt his invitation to join Overwatch. Reinhardt remained with Overwatch until he retired, but answered Winston's call when Overwatch was reactivated. Reinhardt wields a rocket hammer that can be used for melee strikes or send out a fire projectile, and can deploy a barrier field to block damage for himself and allies. He can use his armor to charge across maps, including catching a foe in his path and crushing them against an obstacle. His ultimate is a powerful earthshatter strike with his hammer that damages and stuns enemies in front of him. Reinhardt is voiced by Darin De Paul.

==== Roadhog ====
Roadhog, real name Mako Rutledge, is Junkrat's Australian enforcer and bodyguard. He wields a Scrap Gun that fires shrapnel in a mid-range automatic firing mode, or a short-range shotgun-like single shot. He also carries a NOS canister filled with "Hogdrogen" to self-heal (Take a Breather), and employs a Chain Hook to pull distant opponents towards him. His ultimate ability, Whole Hog, allows him to put a top loader into his scrap gun, firing it in full auto mode with increased knockback, wider spread, and no need to reload. Within a November 2023 patch to Overwatch 2, Roadhog's kit was modified slightly to address some of the incohesiveness of the original kit. The Scrap Gun was made into a single firing mode that has both a short-range shotgun burst in addition to mid-range projectiles. Take a Breather was changed to be a resource-based healing mode, allowing the player to use as much stored Hogdrogen to heal Roadhog, along with a shorter cooldown period. Finally, a new second ability, Pig Pen, was added, allowing Roadhog to lay down a trap that can slow and damage enemies that cross it, including those pulled in by Roadhog's Chain Hook. This was reverted in a future patch, removing Roadhog's Pig pen ability. Another major rework of Roadhog was released with Season 5 in Octoboer 2026, replacing his weapon's alternate fire with a Trash Compactor ability, which absorbs incoming damage and converts that to a single ball of scrap that hits with explosive damage. Roadhog is voiced by Josh Petersdorf.

==== Sigma ====
Sigma, real name Siebren de Kuiper, is a Dutch astrophysicist associated with Talon. After sustaining psychological damage from an experiment creating a black hole and gaining gravitational powers, he was kept in a secret government facility for years as "Subject Sigma". Talon discovered his existence and freed him for their own ends, though he is unaware of this manipulation. His main weapons are Hyperspheres, gravitic projectiles that can bounce off walls and damage a small area that draw foes into the explosion, and Accretion, which gathers debris into a large projectile to kinetically throw at opponents, causing knockback. He also has two defensive abilities: Experimental Barrier, a barrier that he can deployed outward in front of him to a variable distance and then recall it, upon which it starts regenerating any damage taken; and Kinetic Grasp, which creates a field that absorbs projectiles and converts them into temporary health for the character. His ultimate, Gravitic Flux, allows him to fly up briefly to place a black hole on the ground. Any opponents trapped within the range of the hole are thrown up into the air for several seconds before being slammed to the ground, taking half of their maximum health on impact. Sigma is voiced by Boris Hiestand.

==== Winston ====
Winston is an intelligent, genetically engineered gorilla, one of several created at the Horizon Lunar Colony on the Moon by Dr. Harold Winston (from which Winston took his name) and his team. The other gorillas revolted against the human scientists, killing them, while Winston took an escape pod to return to Earth. There, he joined up with Overwatch, using his scientific knowledge to help the team. Winston remained at the Gibraltar base when Overwatch was first disbanded, but was the one to reactive the team upon seeing the Null Sector threat. He wields a tesla cannon that can shoot short bursts of electricity in front of him or a charged ranged shot. He can leap a great distance, damaging foes near where he lands, and he can place a spherical dome shield. In his ultimate, he becomes enraged, gaining powerful melee strikes and longer leaping distances to tear through enemy lines. Winston is voiced by Crispin Freeman.

==== Wrecking Ball ====
Hammond, ring name Wrecking Ball, is a super-intelligent hamster mechanic, also created by the Horizon Moon Colony scientists. As Winston planned his escape during the gorilla revolution, Hammond also planned his own escape in a spherical pod, piggy-backing off Winston's escape pod, breaking free and landing near Junkertown. There, he converted his pod into a mech and participated in the Junkertown Arena under the name Wrecking Ball, becoming Junker Queen's champion and bodyguard. In its spherical form, Wrecking Ball can roll about the map, using a grappling hook to gain speed and do more damage to those foes he hits. While near foes, he can activate an adaptive shield powered by the number of nearby enemies, which he then can transfer to allies at a different location. While in the air, he can initiate a powerful ground strike that briefly launches enemies. The mech can transform into a quadrupedal form, and he can fire four gatling guns at enemies. His ultimate lets him launch a small field of floating mines that damage enemies that contact them. Hammond's animal noises are voiced by Dee Bradley Baker, while his mech's computer, which translates these to known vocabulary, is voiced by Jonathan Lipow.

==== Zarya ====
Zarya, full name Aleksandra Zaryanova, is a Russian powerlifter and soldier. She uses a particle cannon that damages foes by a continuous beam or a projectile. The strength of these attacks comes from the amount of damage absorbed by the barriers that she can project around herself or allies, which decays over time and with each attack. Her ultimate creates a gravity well that draws all nearby foes to it and unable to escape until the well dissapates. Zarya is voiced by Dolya Gavanski.

=== Damage heroes ===
Damage heroes, also known as "DPS" (short for damage per second), are those that have the largest capacity to deal damage to enemy players, and tend to be able to move quickly around the map. However, they can be more vulnerable to attacks from the other team with lower hit points than other roles.

==== Anran ====
Anran Ye is a Chinese martial artist with abilities based around fire. She is the older sister of Wuyang and a fourth-year student at Wuxing University's Fire College in Chengdu, China. She first appeared in the game's official comic "Against the Tide", where she fought against the Omnic attack at Chengdu together with Wuyang. She is then invited to join Overwatch alongside him. She uses a pair of flaming folding fans. Anran is voiced by Fareeha Yue Andersen.

==== Ashe ====
Ashe, full name Elizabeth Caledonia "Calamity" Ashe, is an American gunslinger and leader of the Deadlock Gang, a band of arms-trafficking outlaws based in Arizona. Her main weapon is The Viper, a lever action repeating rifle that can be used for short-ranged quick fire or sighted long shots. She also carries a Coach gun which can knock enemies back and propel her up or away from obstacles as well as enable limited rocket jumping, and can throw Dynamite bundles that detonate after a short delay or immediately when shot with her rifle, setting opponents on fire. Her ultimate ability summons B.O.B., her Omnic butler/bodyguard, who charges forward to knock enemies into the air before laying down suppressive fire with his built-in arm cannons. Unlike deployable assets from other heroes, such as Torbjörn's turrets, B.O.B. serves as a temporary sixth player on the team until his health is exhausted, and thus is able to capture or challenge objectives, and can be healed by allies. Ashe is voiced by Jennifer Hale.

==== Bastion ====
Bastion is a combat robot-turned-explorer. Due to conflicts with fearful humans, Bastion largely avoids populated areas in favor of exploring the wild. It is usually accompanied by a small bird named Ganymede, who was building a nest on it when it reactivated, and both humanizes Bastion and makes it relatable. Bastion is eventually found by Overwatch's former chief engineer, Torbjörn Lindholm, who decides to take the omnic in after seeing Bastion resisting its combat protocol. Locating to Torbjörn's workshop, Bastion continues to help the inventor there. In Overwatch, it can Reconfigure between a mobile form outfitted with a submachine gun (Configuration: Recon) and a tank form equipped with a Gatling gun (Configuration: Assault). It also has the ability to launch a grenade (A-36 Tactical Grenade), and its Ironclad passive reduces damage taken while in Assault form. Its ultimate ability is Configuration: Artillery, in which bastion becomes stationary and is able to launch 3 artillery shells anywhere on the map.

==== Cassidy ====
Cole Cassidy is an American bounty hunter and vigilante with a cybernetic arm and a Wild West motif. He carries his Peacekeeper six-shooter, with its primary fire that can shoot single shots with high accuracy at moderate range, and its alternate fire allowing him to Fan the Hammer to quickly unload any remaining ammo at close range in rapid fire with some loss of accuracy. He can quickly dodge attacks using his Combat Roll ability which also instantly reloads his revolver. In Overwatch he could throw a Flashbang grenade a short distance which stunned enemies and interrupted their abilities. In Overwatch 2, the Flashbang ability was replaced with a short-range Magnetic Grenade that had a certain degree of homing and dealt high damage on a direct hit, and hindered the enemy causing them to move slower and be unable to use abilities while the grenade is attached. This was replaced with his old Flashbang ability in season 10 which works the same as in the original Overwatch. Cassidy's ultimate ability is Deadeye, which allows him to line up shots on every enemy in his sight, with resulting damage proportional to the time spent aiming. Cassidy is voiced by Matthew Mercer.

==== Echo ====
Echo is a female gynoid created by Dr. Mina Liao after the Omnic Crisis. Her primary attack is a Tri-Shot that is a set of three projectiles at a time, and she can fire a Sticky Bomb that does initial damage on striking a target and then after a short time explodes that does damage in a small area. She also has a Focusing Beam that damages a target in the beam, with damage intensified for targets that are below half-health, including barriers. She also has a Flight ability that can launch her into the air, and her Glide passive ability allows her to hover and descend at a controlled rate with good horizontal control. Her ultimate ability is Duplicate, which allows Echo to take the appearance and ability of any Hero on the opposing team (save for Echo) for 15 seconds, with an accelerated ultimate gain rate. Echo was originally voiced by Blizzard employee Lauren Tom in Reunion, with Jeannie Bolet later taking over the role.

==== Emre ====
Emre Sarioglu is a Turkish soldier and a former member of Overwatch's strike team. He aided several of its operations, including helping to recover Genji after Hanzo nearly killed him. After Overwatch's collapse, he joined Talon as a mercenary but would repeatedly go dark during missions, making him a target for a bounty that Maximilien contracts to Freja. After Freja finds Emre in Riyadh, he is revealed to have undergone numerous cybernetic enhancements; however, these augmentations appear to manipulate his body and mind into becoming a ruthless killer. He uses a three-round burst rifle that can be used both hip-firing and down its sights for better accuracy. He can briefly create a Siphon Blaster that fires life-stealing rounds, and throw Cyber Frag grenades. His ultimate, Override Protocol, transforms Emre into a living weapon that fires rapid, explosive shots for a brief period. Emre is voiced by Kerem Erdinc.

==== Freja ====
Freja Skov is a Danish bounty hunter and former search and rescue operative for Overwatch. In the game's present, she is a free agent, taking jobs from Maximilien. Freja's primary weapon is her Revdraw Crossbow, which rapidly fires projectiles. Her ability Take Aim slows her descent and lets her fire a precise explosive bolt from her crossbow. Her movement abilities are a Quick Dash to lunge forward while refreshing Take Aim, and Updraft that propels her upward. Her passive ability, Bounty Hunting, grants her bonus ultimate charge after finishing off 3 opponents. Freja's ultimate Bola Shot ensnares a target enemy, draws in nearby foes, and then explodes. Freja is voiced by Olivia Le Andersen.

==== Genji ====
Genji Shimada is a Japanese cyborg ninja. His main attack method is to throw three Shurikens, either in quick succession or simultaneously in a horizontal spread. His abilities are Swift Strike, a quick dashing lunge with good range, and Deflect, a defensive stance that briefly ricochets projectiles back at enemies with his wakizashi. His Cyber-Agility allows him to double-jump and run up walls. Genji's ultimate ability is Dragonblade, during which Genji unsheathes the odachi on his back and delivers powerful, sweeping melee attacks to any targets within reach for a limited amount of time. Genji is voiced by Gaku Space.

==== Hanzo ====
Hanzo Shimada is a Japanese archer, assassin and mercenary and the elder brother of Genji. He wields the Storm Bow and is equipped with specialized arrows, including Sonic Arrows to detect enemies and Storm Arrows to fire five weaker shots in rapid succession. He is also able to Wall Climb, enabling him to reach vantage points, and Lunge forward while in mid-air. His ultimate ability is Dragonstrike, in which he unleashes a spiraling spirit dragon that can travel through obstacles to deal damage in a straight line. Hanzo is voiced by Paul Nakauchi.

==== Hudson ====
Hudson is an Omnic detective that is part of a Manhattan detective agency. He is expected to be introduced with the start of Season 6 in December 2026.

==== Junkrat ====
Junkrat, real name Jamison Fawkes, is an Australian scavenger, mercenary and anarchist. Evicted from Junkertown by Junker Queen, Junkrat is still the target of several bounty hunters over a valuable secret he claims to know, and hired Roadhog to be his bodyguard. Junkrat carries a Frag Launcher that fires grenades and employs Steel Traps and remote-detonated Concussion Mines; when he is killed, several primed grenades are released from his body in a final attempt to get back at the attacker (Total Mayhem). Junkrat's ultimate ability is RIP-Tire, a self-propelled truck wheel loaded with explosives that he is able to manually steer and detonate. Junkrat is voiced by Chris Parson.

==== Mei ====
Mei, full name Mei-Ling Zhou, is a Chinese climatologist and adventurer from Xi'an. Prior to the Omnic Crisis she was stationed in Antarctica, but her team took to cryogenic slumber at the war's onset. All but Mei's chambers failed, and when she woke, with no way of contacting for help, she followed Winston's signal to reunite Overwatch to find her way towards civilization. She wields an Endothermic Blaster that can either freeze enemies in place with a short-range spray or shoot a long-range icicle projectile, and she can also use it to Cryo-Freeze herself in a solid ice block to shield herself from damage and heal injuries, as well as erect Ice Walls with many versatile uses, primarily for blocking the enemies. Her ultimate ability is Blizzard, which calls down Snowball, her personal weather modification drone, to freeze all enemies in a wide radius. Mei is voiced by Yu "Elise" Zhang.

==== Pharah ====
Pharah, real name Fareeha Amari, is an Egyptian security officer and the daughter of Ana Amari. She wears the Raptora Mark VI, a jetpack-equipped combat suit, and wields a Rocket Launcher as her primary weapon. She has a Wedjat (Eye of Horus) tattoo around her right eye. Her abilities are Concussive Blast, a rocket with powerful knockback and damages enemies. And Jump Jets, a quick jetpack-assisted vertical ascension comparable to a rocket jump, this also restores half of her fuel. She also has Jet Dash which is a horizontal boost. Her passive ability allows her to Hover in the air, which is paired well with her Jump Jets ability. Pharah's ultimate ability is Barrage, where she fires a continuous stream of small air-to-ground rockets at targets, while her movement speed is significantly reduced. Pharah is voiced by Jen Cohn.

==== Reaper ====
Reaper, real name Gabriel Reyes, is an American mercenary and terrorist, originally a founding member of Overwatch, now a leading member of Talon. He is attired in a black hooded trenchcoat with a white skull mask and wields twin Hellfire Shotguns. His abilities are Shadow Step, a medium-range line of sight teleport, and Wraith Form, a brief period of invincibility and speed increase. He was able to heal himself by consuming the souls of fallen enemies, visible as red burning "Soul Globes" on the ground but later was changed to a passive ability called The Reaping which allows him to heal 30% of the damage he deals. Reaper's ultimate ability is Death Blossom, a twin shotgun gun kata which deals massive damage in a short radius around him. Reaper is voiced by Keith Ferguson.

==== Shion ====
Shion is an Omnic assassin and elder of the Talon-affiliated Hashimoto clan. She had been captured by the clan after she gained sentience as an Omnic, but turned against them, killing the existing elders and taking over the clan herself. Though an omnic, she took to human indulgances, such as fashion and riding motorcycles. She fights with a pair of Kira pistols that can be fired individually or simultaneously, as well as in a single burst attack. She can quick dodge, and also summon her motorcycle to move about the map quickly, then discounting it while launching it forward to damage foes. Her ultimate lets her perform three dashes forward in a row, unleashing gunfire along the way. Shion is voiced by Mariko Baika.

==== Sierra ====
Sierra Turner Woods is an American mercenary. She was raised by her mother and moved frequently until one day her mother disappeared. She eventually found her father, and learned of a possible connection to Helix Security that supported the Overwatch watchpoint at Grand Mesa. There, she learned her mother had been Soldier: 00, the first candidate in the experimental enhancement program. When Talon attacked Grand Mesa, she helped Overwatch forces to find off the attack, and learning that Reaper and Soldier: 76 were also products of the enhancement program, opted to join Overwatch to continue to search for her mother. She is armed with a rifle, including a mode that can launch a tracer dart at an opponent drawing all of Sierra's fire to that target for a short time. She is accompanied by a drone naned DoR.O.T.H.y that she can use as a grapple point for high mobility and fling a shrapnel grenade below her. Her ultimate uses Dorothy to set a number of explosive charges over an area, denotating simultaneously. She is voiced by Khaya Fraites.

==== Soldier: 76 ====
Soldier: 76, real name Jack Francis Morrison, is an American soldier-turned-vigilante and a founding member of Overwatch. He wears a facemask with a visor and carries an experimental Heavy Pulse Rifle equipped with an underbarrel launcher that fires three Helix Rockets. His abilities are Sprint, a forward run with no duration limit or cooldown, and Biotic Field, a deployable device which regenerates the health of allies in the immediate vicinity. His ultimate ability, Tactical Visor, puts up a head-up display that allows his rifle to automatically track enemies in his line of sight for a brief period. Soldier: 76 is voiced by Fred Tatasciore.

==== Sojourn ====
Sojourn, real name Vivian Chase, is a Canadian soldier who serves as a captain within the Overwatch team. According to lore, Sojourn had worked with Overwatch commander Soldier: 76 during the Omnic War, which led to her joining with the organization, where she either commanded agents or provided long-range cover for field teams. She has cybernetic implants in her head, as well as a cybernetic arm that transforms into a disruptor cannon. Her carried weapon is a prototype railgun, which she is able to handle the increased recoil of due to her cybernetics. Her primary weapon is a machine gun that build up energy over time, which then can be unleashed as a railgun shot through its secondary fire. She can launch an area-of-effect Disruptor Shot that traps and drains enemies while building her railgun energy. She can perform a Power Slide that can be used to finish into a high jump. Her Ultimate is Overclock which continually recharges her railgun and makes its shots piercing. Sojourn is voiced by Cherise Boothe.

==== Symmetra ====
Symmetra, real name Satya Vaswani, is an Indian "architech" (equal parts architect and engineer) working for the Vishkar Corporation. She wields a Photon Projector that emits a short-ranged beam that does more damage the longer it remains on an opponent. Her primary fire will charge her ammo instead of using it, making her a good counter to barriers. It can also be used to charge up and launch a slow-moving ball of energy in a straight line. She can fire up to three Sentry Turrets that attach to any surface they touch, and which damage opponents in close range. She has a Teleporter skill that allows her to place the entrance and exits points of a warp tunnel that has an infinite duration, through which teammates and certain projectiles and weapons can travel through, until the teleporter is recalled by Symmetra or destroyed by an enemy. Her ultimate ability is a Photon Barrier, a powerful energy barrier that blocks opponents' fire, and large enough to cut through the entire map. Symmetra is voiced by Anjali Bhimani.

==== Torbjörn ====
Torbjörn Lindholm is a dwarfish Swedish engineer and weapons designer, and a founding member of Overwatch, as well as Brigitte's father. His primary weapon is a rivet gun, but can also throw down a turret that automatically attacks the nearest enemy in sight. Torbjörn can use his forging hammer to repair damaged turrets as well as for melee attacks. He can enter an overload ability, briefly buffing his armor, attacks, and attack speed for a short period, while with his ultimate, he can cover a wide area of ground with molten metal, damaging enemies moving through it. Torbjörn was one of the first characters designed for Overwatch, intended to help bridge Blizzard's art styles between Warcraft and Overwatch, and served as a template for most of the other launch heroes. Torbjörn is voiced by Keith Silverstein.

==== Tracer ====
Tracer, real name Lena Oxton, is a British pilot, adventurer, and member of Overwatch. She wields dual rapid-fire Pulse Pistols, and is equipped with a "chronal accelerator" which grants her the ability to either jump forward in time, crossing many meters in a split second (Blink) or rewind three seconds into the past to heal and restore ammunition (Recall). Her ultimate ability is Pulse Bomb, an explosive charge that sticks to enemies, exploding after a brief delay for massive damage. Tracer is voiced by Cara Theobold.

==== Vendetta ====
Vendetta, real name Marzia Bartalotti, is an Italian swordswoman and the daughter of high-ranking Talon member Antonio Bartalotti; though designed to become heir to Talon, she was cast aside, and instead she spent her time in gladiatorial games as a fighter known as La Lupa while plotting her revenge. She reappears at Talon's headquarters, dethroning Doomfist and taking charge of Talon to lead the fight against Overwatch. She wields Palatine Fang, a hard light great sword that she uses for slashing and whirlwind attacks. She can also throw the sword and fly to its location, while her ultimate charges her blade to perform a damaging attack to all in front of her. She is voiced by Chiara Preziosi.

==== Venture ====
Venture, real name Sloan Cameron, is a Canadian archaeologist, belonging to an archaeological research group known as the Wayfinder Society, and the hero that Blizzard added to Overwatch 2 during Season 10 in April 2024, being playable during an open test period in the prior month. Venture is the first non-binary character in Overwatch. They are equipped with a futuristic drill which they use as a weapon, a Smart Excavator, which fires a seismic projectile that bursts after a short distance. With the excavator, they can Drill Dash to spring towards the direction they are facing, damaging opponents. They can also Burrow underground for short distances, remaining invulnerable while underground, and jumping out to do damage to foes above them. They can use their Drill Dash ability while Burrow is active, damaging enemies and knocking them into the air. Passively, using their abilities gains temporary shields through their Explorer's Resolve, and does more melee damage with quick attacks though their Clobber skill. Their ultimate ability is a Tectonic Shock that sends out shock waves through the ground to heavily damage enemies. Venture is voiced by Valeria Rodriguez.

==== Widowmaker ====
Widowmaker, real name Amélie Lacroix, is a French sniper and assassin. She wields the Widow's Kiss, a versatile rifle that fires in full automatic at close-range, and can convert into a sniper rifle for long-range kills. She also uses a Grappling Hook to reach high ledges and Venom Mines to disable enemies. Her ultimate ability is Infra-Sight, which activates her recon visor to highlight all enemies through walls for her and her team, similar to a wallhack. Widowmaker is voiced by Chloé Hollings.

=== Support heroes ===
Support heroes typically have less offensive ability and instead provide support for their teammates by healing them, and in some cases providing other buffs and helpful effects. They may also be able to apply debuffs to the opposing team, making them more susceptible to attack. Support heroes automatically regenerate their own health more readily than other heroes.

==== Ana ====
Ana Amari is an Egyptian sniper and bounty hunter, one of the founding members of Overwatch, and Pharah's mother. Her rifle fires biotic rounds that can heal allies or make foes vunerable. She also can throw biotic grenades that do the same with splash damage. She can fire a traquilizer shot that briefly puts an enemy to sleep. Her ultimate heals an ally to full health and briefly increases their attack and defense bonus. Ana is voiced by Aysha Selim.

==== Baptiste ====
Baptiste, full name Jean-Baptiste Augustin, is a Haitian combat medic and former operative of Talon. He had been recruited into Talon as an orphan from the Omnic Crisis, but became disenfranchised with Talon's violent goals, quitting the organization and became hunted. Tipped off by his friend Mauga about a planned strike against Overwatch, Baptiste was eventually found by Cole and brought into Overwatch's ranks. Baptiste welds a burst fire submachine gun that also can fire healing grenades at allies. He has boost that he can charge to give him a high jumping ability. He also can throw out a brief burst of healing to himself and nearby allies, and throw up a device that creates an immortality field for a brief period or until the device is destroyed. His ultimate creates a rectangular gateway that increases the damage of ally projectiles that pass through it while also reducing the damage from enemy projectiles. Baptiste is voiced by Benz Antoine.

==== Brigitte ====
Brigitte Lindholm, the youngest daughter of Torbjörn, is a Swedish engineer and adventurer. She wields a flail that can whip enemies in close range as well as strike at a distance. She also carries a shield she can use to protect herself or use to ram enemies to knock them back. She can also throw out healing packs to her allies. In her ultimate, she rallies herself and allies to move and attack faster with additional health and armor for a brief time. Brigitte is voiced by Matilda Smedius.

==== Doctrine ====
Doctrine, real name Tamuka Yeukai, is a Zimbabwean cyberneticist and ally of Doomfist who is rescued from an Overwatch supermax prison in Grímsvötn. His skills combine technology and vampire-like powers, using his primary attack to heal allies and damage foes. He can command bat-like drones using his sceptre and use infusion to add a powerful effect to his next ability, such as turning his dash into free-flight. His ultimate, Deliverance, sends a large swarm of drones to grant overhealth to allies while reducing the maximum health of foes for a short period. He made available as part of a hero trial during the 2026 Blizzcon in September 2026 when he was announced, and added in full to the game in Season 5 starting in October 2026. He was developed initially as a scientist who would help Doomfist repair his cybernetic arm, but as the narrative developers considered what a vampire would be in the Overwatch universe, Doctrine was refined to employ life-stealing powers as part of his design. Doctrine is voiced by Tashinga Bepete.

==== Illari ====
Illari Quispe Ruiz is a Peruvian warrior who channels solar energy to attack and heal. She was destined to become an Inti Warrior, imbued with powers of the sun, but during her augmentation ceremony, an unintentional burst of solar energy killed many including the other Inti Warriors, a guilt that she carries with her. She carries a solar rifle that can either fire a single shot to damage enemies or in its secondary mode, heal allies. She can place a healing pylon to any nearby surface that pulses healing enemies to nearby allies. She can emit a burst of energy to knockback enemies around her. Her ultimate ability fires a large solar burst that slows enemies in its blast for a brief period, and can explode if they take enough damage while affected. Illari is voiced by Andre Cisneros.

==== Jetpack Cat ====
Jetpack Cat, real name Fika, is a sentient stray cat who wandered around the Overwatch Gibraltar base, adopted by Brigitte who fitted her with a jetpack to provide support for the Overwatch team. She constantly flies, and can fire bionic projectiles that heal allies and damage foes. She can offer a tether to her allies to carry them across the battlefield or give them strategic positioning for attacks. Her ultimate ability allows her to slam into the ground, latch onto the nearest enemy, and carry them elsewhere. Jetpack Cat's meows and other animal sounds are provided by Jennifer Hale.

==== Juno ====
Juno Teo Minh is a medic from a Mars colony that was secretly founded by Lucheng Interstellar as "Project Red Promise" to terraform the planet for future inhabitants. Juno is the first and only child born on Mars, nicknamed as a Martian despite being human, and has Singaporean Chinese and Vietnamese ancestry, and was sent back to Earth to locate help for the colony. She can move quickly with her boots, allowing her to double-jump and hover in the air, and she can also provide an accelerating ring to speed up her allies. Her blaster pistol heals allies and damages enemies, and she can launch pulsar torpedoes that lock on to both allies and foes to heal and damage them, respectively. Her ultimate fires a large beam that heals and provides offensive buffs to all allies within its radius. Juno is voiced by Xanthe Huynh.

==== Kiriko ====
Kiriko Kamori is a Japanese ninja who was trained by her mother alongside the Shimada brothers, Genji and Hanzo. She can throw paper ofuda that heal allies, kunai knives that damage enemies, and a protective suzu bells that clears allies in range of any debuffs. She can climb walls, and can also teleport to a nearby ally. Her ultimate summons a ghostly kitsune spirit that runs through a line of torii gates, granting allies in its path increased speed and offensive buffs. Kiriko is voiced by Sally Amaki.

==== Lifeweaver ====
Lifeweaver, real name Niran "Bua" Pruksamanee, is a Thai scientist and adventurer who has harnessed the use of hard-light constructs for healing purposes, which he calls Biolight. He is a friend of Symmetra, who he met during his time at the Vishkar Architech Academy. He send out bursts of healing to allies, or use needle-like thorns to damage foes. He can create platforms made of petals that lift up whenever any player steps on them, and he can use a life grip ability to grab a wounded ally out of battle while healing them. For his ultimate, he can create a biolight tree that can block line of sight while healing allies nearby. Lifeweaver is voiced by Phuwin Tangsakyuen.

==== Lúcio ====
Lúcio Correia dos Santos is a Brazilian DJ and freedom fighter. He is equipped with futuristic roller blades that allow him to skate on walls and gain speed boosts when jumping off them. His sonic amplifier gun fires directed sound waves that damage and knockback enemies, and continuously emits either a healing field or an accelerating field for allies, both which can be briefly boosted. With his ultimate, he slams his amplifier to the ground, healing all nearby allies a large amount of defensive shield. Lúcio is voiced by Jonny Cruz.

==== Mercy ====
Mercy, real name Angela Ziegler, is a Swiss field medic and first responder for Overwatch. She wears a winged Valkyrie suit, which allows her to rush towards targeted teammates through the air and follow it up with a long jump into the air with controlled descent. Her Caduceus staff can target an ally at some distance and provide healing or an offsensive boost while active. She also carries a sidearm she can use to hit enemies. She is also able to resurrect a fallen ally, though this ability has a long cooldown. Her ultimate allows her to fly high above the battlefield for an extended duration and lets her staff beam connect to all nearby allies, applying the healing or offense boost across all. Mercy is voiced by Lucie Pohl.

==== Mizuki ====
Mizuki Kawano is a Japanese assassin and member of the Talon-affiliated Hashimoto clan. His primary attack is a Spirit Glaive that spins to damage enemies. His kasa can be thrown at allies to heal them and heal Mizuki on return. He can launch Binding Chains that slows and hinders enemies it hits. For movement, Mizuki can leap forward, leaving a katashiro paper doll behind, later reactivating to return to that spot and gaining a temporary speed boost. His ultimate is the Kekkai Sanctuary, creating a field which heals all allies within while blocking attacks from foes outside it. Mizuki is voiced by Julian Cihi.

==== Moira ====
Moira O'Deorain is an Irish geneticist, a leading member of Talon, and Minister of Genetics for the city of Oasis. She can emit a spray of healing energy for allies, or draw life energy from an enemy. She can similarly launch an orb that heals or damages, depending on type, that moves and bounces off walls and obstacles. She can fade, moving in an incorporeal form to a new location. Her ultimate fires a large beam that heals any allies and damages any foe within it, as well as ignoring all barriers. Moira is voiced by Genevieve O'Reilly.

==== Sombra ====
Sombra, real name Olivia Colomar, is a Mexican hacker and infiltrator. Prior to Season 5, released in October 2026, Sombra was classified as a damage hero, with the ability to hack opposing players and weakening them for a short time, but with this update, she was moved to support with changes in her kit, using her hacking abilities more to provide buffs and healing to allies. She is equipped with a low-damage, high-capacity Machine Pistol for short range combat. Her hacking ability allows her to Hotfix allies, granting a period of healing. She can also use this ability to affect enemy turrets, disabling them temporarily, or neutral health kits to make them become unusable to the enemy team for a period of time. Sombra also has Translocator, a beacon she throws out and teleports to, which activates stealth, which makes her invisible for a short time, or until she gets too close to an enemy, takes damage, or hacks an ally. Her Cyberspace ability creates a zone that heals allies allies while weakening enemies. Sombra's ultimate ability is EMP, an electromagnetic shockwave that hacks all enemies around her, as well as disabling their barriers and damaging them for a percent of their current health, it also displays if they have fully charged ultimate. Sombra is voiced by Carolina Ravassa.

==== Wuyang ====
Wuyang Ye is a Chinese martial artist with abilities based around water. He is a first-year student at Wuxing University in Chengdu, which has five campuses named after the Wuxing concepts. While his parents and older sister Anran attended Wuxing's prestigious, combat-focused Fire College, Wuyang only scored high enough to be accepted into the Water College's medical program, and was thus viewed as a disappointment to his family's legacy. Eager to prove his worth, he began studying Fire College lectures in addition to his regular medical studies. He was able to use both his martial arts skills and healing technology during an Omnic attack to save his sister, regaining his family's respect. He is then recruited into the newly reformed Overwatch alongside Anran. Wuyang's story was influenced by senior narrative director Joshi Zhang, who had also struggled with gaining respect from his sister, as well as struggles accepting his Chinese background. Zhang also said the inclusion of Wuyang and the Wuxing concepts as to provide a means to bring a means to represent the traditions of China, in contrast to Mei who was more of a global explorer. Zhang said some of the influence was traditional Chinese wuxia fiction, such as The Legend of the Condor Heroes, which mixes martial arts with magical elements. Several outlets compared Wuyang's story to that from Avatar: The Last Airbender, though where in Avatar, the characters' abilities with the elements are fueled by magic, Wuyang's control of water is by modern technology advancements.

Wuyang wields a Xuanwu Staff which fires water orbs at opponents with some degree of control over their direction, along with a secondary Restorative Staff function that can passively heal a target player, with the ability to boost the rate of healing for a short period. His Guardian Wave ability briefly boosts the healing rate of all allies in front of it while pushing back enemy players, while his Rushing Torrent ability lets him use water to move about the field quickly. Wuyang's ultimate is Tidal Blast, which surrounds the target player with a protective sphere of water that later explodes, greatly healing the player within it while harming nearby foes. While a support character, Blizzard developed the character to be an offensive support similar to Zenyatta, making his healing ability mostly passive so that the player can focus on dealing damage, and to address players' concerns about characters losing their identities due to the shift towards damage focus that came with Overwatch 2.

Wuyang is currently the game's 44th hero and was released with the 18th season in the latter half of 2025. A playable trial was held during the latter weeks of the 17th season during August 2025. He was originally developed under the working name "Aqua".

Wuyang is voiced by Howard Wang.

==== Zenyatta ====
Tekhartha Zenyatta is an omnic monk and wanderer. Belonging to an order of omnic monks in Nepal, he travels the world to try and bridge the world between omnics and humans and help others find inner peace. He can launch metallic prayer beads to hit enemies one at a time, or multiple in a charged shot. He can mark an enemy with an Orb of Discord that makes them vulnerable to damage, and similarly mark an ally with an Orb of Harmony to provide healing. He also has an empowered kick melee. His ultimate greatly increases the rate of healing to all allies within its reach, making them near invulnerable while it is active. Zenyatta is voiced by Feodor Chin.

=== Non-playable characters ===
The following are characters who appear in other Overwatch media.

==== Antonio Bartalotti ====
Antonio Bartalotti was an Italian businessman and member of Talon who orchestrated a terrorist attack on Overwatch's headquarters in Oslo, Norway, in the comic "Retribution". He was killed by Gabriel Reyes, part of the Blackwatch covert arm of Overwatch, during the events of the story-based game mode of the same name. Antonio was later revealed to be the father of Vendetta, who witnessed his death and vowed revenge against Blackwatch.

==== Athena ====
Athena is Winston's personal artificial intelligence, who supervises his vitals and keeps track of all former Overwatch agents. Together, she and Winston were able to activate the Recall that contacted all the agents at the beginning of the Second Omnic Crisis, which initiates the events of the game. She also serves as the in-game announcer. Athena is voiced by Evelyn Duah.

==== Mama Hong ====
Mama Hong was a cut design from the original pitch graphic for Overwatch, appearing as an overweight Asian woman with a cigarette in her mouth and curlers of various colors in her hair, and bearing a significant resemblance to the Landlady character from the 2004 martial arts film Kung Fu Hustle. While her class was not defined, her ability was called "Manslaughter". Despite not being included in the final product, since her reveal she has remained a popular request from fans to include in the game. Several developers have commented on wanting to revisit her inclusion, with 3D character artist Melissa Kelly stating that she created a bust of the character as one of her first student projects. Richard Warren of GameRant meanwhile expressed his hope that the character could see inclusion in light of the introduction of Jetpack Cat, suggesting that she gave motherly mob boss vibes and could increase the resepresentation of older characters in the game alongside Ana, and that her character ability's name contrasted well with the more positive vibes of the series. However, while Kotaku's Mathew Rodriguez cited her an example of the developers considering a wider range of body diversity, Kenneth Shepard of the same publication felt she did not quite mesh with the character design of Overwatch, and pointed out how others saw her as a racial stereotype.

In 2026, when asked about the character, Aaron Keller stated that they currently had no plans to include the character, expressing that she resembled too much of a stereotype and worried her inclusion may offend others, and would need to consult cultural experts to change her design. However, he acknowledged that this stance resulted in some disagreements from others on Overwatch's development team.

==== Maximilien ====
Maximilien is a wealthy omnic and a member of Talon's inner council, who handles the organization's finances. He first appears in the comic "Masquerade", where he is seen operating a casino in Monaco. In the story-based game mode "Storm Rising" he is captured by Tracer, Genji, Winston, and Mercy after a pursuit in Havana, Cuba. Maximilien was created specifically for the comic by Michael Chu, who envisioned the character as a "Bond villain". Arnold Tsang designed him around this aspect and made him "classy, swanky" to differentiate him from the other omnic villains Maximilien is voiced by Stéphane Cornicard.

==== Mina Liao ====
Dr. Mina Liao is one of the scientists at the Omnica Corporation that created the Omnics, and upon Omnic Crisis, was invited to join Overwatch to fight them as a founding member, along with Jack Morrison, Gabriel Reyes, Ana Amari, Torbjörn Lindholm, and Reinhardt Wilhelm. During her time at Overwatch, she created the Omnic Echo as a benevolent artificial intelligence hoping that it would help save humanity. She was killed during an attack on Overwatch headquarters, and Echo took her personality as part of her legacy.

==== Tekhartha Mondatta ====
Tekhartha Mondatta was an omnic monk and leader of the Shambali. In the years following the Omnic Crisis, Mondatta and a group of other omnics abandoned their pre-programmed lives and settled in a communal monastery in Nepal, where they meditated on the nature of existence and came to believe that they were more than just "artificial"—they possessed their own souls, just as humans did. Mondatta was a leader in advocating peace between humans and omnics and healing the wounds following the Omnic Crisis, and traveled the world spreading his message. Mondatta was assassinated by Widowmaker during a rally in London, despite heavy security and the efforts of Tracer. In the King's Row map, a statue of him holding the hand of a human child stands near the spot where he was killed. Mondatta and Zenyatta take their names from Zenyatta Mondatta, a 1980 album by English rock band The Police. Mondatta is voiced by Sendhil Ramamurthy.
