= 2021 Los Angeles Gladiators season =

Overwatch League season

- Head coach: David "dpei" Pei
- General manager: Brenda "bsuh" Suh
- Owner: Stan Kroenke; Josh Kroenke
- Region: West

Results
- Record: 11–5 (.688)
- Place: West: 2nd; League: 4th
- May Melee: Did not qualify
- June Joust: Regional finals
- Summer Showdown: Regional finals
- Countdown Cup: Champions
- Season Playoffs: Lower round 2
- Total Earnings: $250,000

The 2021 Los Angeles Gladiators season will be the fourth season of Los Angeles Gladiators's existence in the Overwatch League and their fourth season under head coach David "dpei" Pei.

== Preceding offseason ==
=== Roster changes ===
The Gladiators entered free agency with six free agents, four of which became free agents due to the Gladiators not exercising the option to retain the player for another year.

==== Acquisitions ====
The Gladiators' first offseason acquisition was Kim "MuZe" Young-hun, a rookie tank player that competed with Paris Eternal's Overwatch Contenders academy team Eternal Academy the previous season, who was signed on November 8, 2020. The next day, they signed Kim "Shu" Jin-seo, a support player that was a "strong presence at the flex support position" with the Guangzhou Charge for the previous two seasons. The Gladiators bolstered their support position on November 12 with the signing of Grant "Moth" Espe, a support player coming off back-to-back Overwatch League championships with the San Francisco Shock and who is considered as one of the best main support players in the world. The team's final acquisition of the offseason was Kim "Skewed" Min-seok, a rookie flex support player from Overwatch Contenders Korea team OZ Gaming who was signed on December 4.

==== Departures ====
None of the Gladiators' free agents returned, two of which signed with other teams, beginning with tank player Son "OGE" Min-seok signing with the Florida Mayhem on December 11, 2020. Tank player Roni "LHCloudy" Tiihonen signed with Overwatch Contenders team Revival on March 11. Three of the Gladiators free agents announced their retirements in the offseason: damage player Jason "Jaru" White, support player Benjamin "BigGoose" Isohanni, and support player Jonas "Shaz" Suovaara. Tank player Aaron "Bischu" Kim did not sign with a team in the offseason.

== Regular season ==
=== May Melee ===
The Gladiators began their 2021 season on April 16, playing against the San Francisco Shock in the May Melee qualifiers. They lost their season opener against the Shock 1–3 despite taking an early lead after winning the first map. They lost their next game against the Dallas Fuel 1–3, unable to adjust to the Fuel's off-meta team compositions throughout the match.

== Final roster ==
2021 Los Angeles Gladiators roster
Players
Coaches

Role	No.	Handle	Name	Nationality
Damage	20	birdring	Kim Ji-hyeok	South Korea
Damage	18	kevster	Persson, Kevin	Sweden
Damage	7	MirroR	Trịnh, Gia Huy	Vietnam
Tank	9	MuZe	Kim Young-hun	South Korea
Tank	16	SPACE	Halpern, Indy	United States
Support	64	moth	Espe, Grant	United States
Support	1	Shu	Kim Jin-seo	South Korea
Support	66	skewed	Kim Min-seok	South Korea

Head coach

- David "dpei" Pei

Legend:
- (I) Inactive
- (S) Suspended
- (2W) Two-way player
- Substitute
- (injured) Injury / Illness

Latest roster transaction: December 4, 2020.

== Standings ==
Pos	Team	Pld	W	L	Pts	PCT	MW	ML	MT	MD	Qualification
1	Dallas Fuel	16	11	5	17	0.688	40	26	3	+14	Advance to season playoffs
2	Los Angeles Gladiators	16	11	5	14	0.688	41	21	0	+20	Advance to season playoffs
3	Atlanta Reign	16	11	5	13	0.688	41	21	0	+20	Advance to season playoffs
4	San Francisco Shock	16	12	4	12	0.750	43	24	2	+19	Advance to play-ins
5	Houston Outlaws	16	11	5	11	0.688	34	24	3	+10	Advance to play-ins
6	Washington Justice	16	9	7	9	0.563	29	26	2	+3	Advance to play-ins
7	Toronto Defiant	16	9	7	9	0.563	31	31	0	0	Advance to play-ins
8	Paris Eternal	16	8	8	8	0.500	32	32	2	0	Advance to play-ins
9	Boston Uprising	16	7	9	7	0.438	27	31	1	−4	Advance to play-ins
10	Florida Mayhem	16	5	11	6	0.313	26	38	2	−12	
11	London Spitfire	16	1	15	1	0.063	12	47	1	−35	
12	Vancouver Titans	16	1	15	1	0.063	10	45	0	−35	

Source: The Overwatch League
Rules for classification: 1) points; 2) winning percentage (including tournaments); 3) regular season wins; 4) regular season map differential

== Game log ==
=== Regular season ===
2021 game log
May Melee

Qualifier match 1	April 16	Los Angeles Gladiators	1	–	3	San Francisco Shock	Online
	1:30 pm PDT	Details					
		2	Ilios			1	
		3	Eichenwalde			4	
		1	Watchpoint: Gibraltar			3	
		1	Lijang Tower			2	

Qualifier match 2	April 17	Dallas Fuel	3	–	1	Los Angeles Gladiators	Online
	3:00 pm PDT	Details					
		2	Lijiang Tower			1	
		4	Blizzard World			3	
		2	Dorado			3	
		2	Temple of Anubis			1	

Qualifier match 3	April 23	Los Angeles Gladiators	3	–	0	London Spitfire	Online
	1:30 pm PDT	Details					
		2	Busan			0	
		3	Havana			1	
		2	Volskaya Industries			1	

Qualifier match 4	April 24	Boston Uprising	0	–	3	Los Angeles Gladiators	Online
	1:30 pm PDT	Details					
		1	Oasis			2	
		2	Watchpoint: Gibraltar			3	
		1	Hanamura			2	

June Joust

Qualifier match 1	May 28	Los Angeles Gladiators	3	–	0	Vancouver Titans	Online
	1:30 pm PDT	Details					
		2	Ilios			0	
		3	Junkertown			2	
		3	Hanamura			2	

Qualifier match 2	May 29	Atlanta Reign	1	–	3	Los Angeles Gladiators	Online
	3:00 pm PDT	Details					
		1	Busan			2	
		3	Rialto			4	
		1	Volskaya Industries			0	
		2	Numbani			3	

Qualifier match 3	June 04	Boston Uprising	1	–	3	Los Angeles Gladiators	Online
	12:00 noon PDT	Details					
		2	Oasis			0	
		1	Temple of Anubis			2	
		1	Eichenwalde			2	
		1	Dorado			2	

Qualifier match 4	June 05	Paris Eternal	1	–	3	Los Angeles Gladiators	Online
	12:00 noon PDT	Details					
		0	Lijiang Tower			2	
		3	Hanamura			2	
		0	Hollywood			3	
		2	Junkertown			3	

Regional finals	June 06	Dallas Fuel	3	–	1	Los Angeles Gladiators	Online
	2:30 pm PDT	Details					
		2	Oasis			1	
		3	Hanamura			2	
		0	Hollywood			1	
		3	Junkertown			2	

Summer Showdown

Qualifier match 1	June 25	Los Angeles Gladiators	3	–	2	San Francisco Shock	Online
	1:30 pm PDT	Details					
		2	Ilios			0	
		3	King's Row			4	
		1	Junkertown			2	
		2	Volskaya Industries			1	
		2	Lijiang Tower			0	

Qualifier match 2	June 27	Los Angeles Gladiators	2	–	3	Paris Eternal	Online
	12:00 noon PDT	Details					
		2	Oasis			0	
		2	Eichenwalde			1	
		2	Route 66			3	
		1	Temple of Anubis			2	
		0	Nepal			2	

Qualifier match 3	July 09	Los Angeles Gladiators	3	–	0	Toronto Defiant	Online
	1:30 pm PDT	Details					
		2	Lijiang Tower			1	
		5	Temple of Anubis			4	
		1	Eichenwalde			0	

Qualifier match 4	July 10	Washington Justice	3	–	2	Los Angeles Gladiators	Online
	3:00 pm PDT	Details					
		2	Nepal			1	
		2	Hanamura			1	
		3	Hollywood			4	
		1	Watchpoint: Gibraltar			2	
		2	Busan			1	

Regional semifinals	July 11	Los Angeles Gladiators	3	–	0	Boston Uprising	Online
	1:30 pm PDT	Details					
		2	Ilios			0	
		2	Hanamura			0	
		4	King's Row			3	

Regional finals	July 11	Los Angeles Gladiators	2	–	3	Atlanta Reign	Online
	4:50 pm PDT	Details					
		0	Lijiang Tower			2	
		1	Temple of Anubis			0	
		0	King's Row			1	
		1	Watchpoint: Gibraltar			0	
		1	Nepal			2	

Countdown Cup

Qualifier match 1	July 31	Atlanta Reign	3	–	2	Los Angeles Gladiators	Online
	1:30 pm PDT	Details					
		2	Lijiang Tower			1	
		1	Blizzard World			2	
		3	Route 66			2	
		1	Temple of Anubis			2	
		2	Oasis			0	

Qualifier match 2	August 01	Los Angeles Gladiators	3	–	0	Washington Justice	Online
	3:00 pm PDT	Details					
		2	Busan			1	
		3	Numbani			2	
		2	Rialto			1	

Qualifier match 3	August 13	Florida Mayhem	1	–	3	Los Angeles Gladiators	Online
	3:00 pm PDT	Details					
		0	Ilios			2	
		0	Temple of Anubis			1	
		3	King's Row			2	
		2	Rialto			3	

Qualifier match 4	August 14	Los Angeles Gladiators	3	–	0	Houston Outlaws	Online
	1:30 pm PDT	Details					
		2	Oasis			0	
		2	Hanamura			0	
		2	Numbani			1	

Regional finals	August 15	San Francisco Shock	2	–	3	Los Angeles Gladiators	Online
	5:15 pm PDT	Details					
		0	Ilios			2	
		2	Hanamura			1	
		3	Blizzard World			2	
		2	Havana			3	
		1	Oasis			2	

Tournament first round	August 19	Los Angeles Gladiators	3	–	2	Chengdu Hunters	Online
	7:30 pm PDT	Details					
		0	Ilios			2	
		2	Temple of Anubis			1	
		3	King's Row			2	
		0	Route 66			1	
		2	Oasis			0	

Upper finals	August 20	Los Angeles Gladiators	3	–	0	Atlanta Reign	Online
	6:00 pm PDT	Details					
		2	Oasis			0	
		4	Hanamura			2	
		3	King's Row			0	

Grand finals	August 21	Chengdu Hunters	3	–	4	Los Angeles Gladiators	Online
	6:00 pm PDT	Details					
		2	Oasis			0	
		0	Temple of Anubis			1	
		2	Numbani			3	
		2	Route 66			3	
		2	Ilios			0	
		3	King's Row			2	
		1	Havana			2	

2021 season schedule

=== Postseason ===
2021 playoff game log
Season Playoffs

Upper round 1	September 21	Philadelphia Fusion	1	–	3	Los Angeles Gladiators	Online
	5:30 pm PDT	Details					
		0	Ilios			2	
		2	Temple of Anubis			1	
		2	King's Row			3	
		1	Havana			3	

Upper round 2	September 22	Los Angeles Gladiators	1	–	3	Shanghai Dragons	Online
	8:30 pm PDT	Details					
		0	Ilios			2	
		2	Hanamura			0	
		0	Numbani			1	
		0	Havana			1	

Lower round 2	September 23	Atlanta Reign	3	–	2	Los Angeles Gladiators	Online
	4:00 pm PDT	Details					
		0	Ilios			2	
		3	Hanamura			2	
		5	King's Row			4	
		1	Dorado			2	
		2	Nepal			0	
