= 2021 Vancouver Titans season =

- Head coach: Steven "Flubby" Coronel
- Owner: Francesco Aquilini
- Region: West

Results
- Record: 1–15 (.063)
- Place: West: 12th; League: 19th
- May Melee: Did not qualify
- June Joust: Did not qualify
- Summer Showdown: Did not qualify
- Countdown Cup: Did not qualify
- Season Playoffs: Did not qualify
- Total Earnings: $0

The 2021 Vancouver Titans season will be the third season of Vancouver Titans's existence in the Overwatch League and the team's first full season under head coach Steven "Flubby" Coronel, after he took over the position midway through their 2020 season.

== Preceding offseason ==
=== Roster changes ===
The Titans entered free agency with four free agents, three of which became free agents due to the Titans not exercising the option to retain the player for another year.

==== Acquisitions ====
The Titan' first offseason acquisitions were Jiri "Linkzr" Masalin, a veteran damage player and hitscan specialist who played three years with the Houston Outlaws, Nathan "Frd" Goebel, a tank player who "meshed well with the adaptable, aggressive" playstyle of the Atlanta Reign, and Anthony "Fire" King, a support player coming from the Reign where he saw little playing time, all of whom were announced on December 1, 2020. The team's only other signing was Kim "Teru" Min-ki, a rookie damage player coming from Overwatch Contenders Korea team O2 Blast where he won Contenders Korea championship in 2020, who was signed on January 4, 2021.

==== Departures ====
None of the Titans' four free agents returned, three of which signed with other teams, beginning with damage player Niclas "Shockwave" Jensen, who signed with the Philadelphia Fusion on November 23, 2020. The following month, on December 18, damage player Samir "Tsuna" Ikram signed with the Paris Eternal. On February 16, 2021, tank player Alhumaidi "KSAA" Alruwaili signed with Overwatch Contenders team New Kings. Additionally, support player Carson "Carcar" First announced his retirement in the offseason.

== Regular season ==
=== May Melee ===
The Titans began their 2021 season on April 17, playing against Canadian rivals Toronto Defiant in the May Melee qualifiers. They lost their opener 1–3. Vancouver lost to the Florida Mayhem 1–3 in their following match.

== Final roster ==
2021 Vancouver Titans roster
Players
Coaches

Role	No.	Handle	Name	Nationality
Damage	17	Dalton	Bennyhoff, Dalton	United States
Damage	49	LiNkzr	Masalin, Jiri	Finland
Damage	15	Teru	Kim Min-ki	South Korea
Tank	71	ChangSik	Moon Chang-sik	South Korea
Tank	4	frdwnr	Goebel, Nathan	United States
Support	0	Fire	King, Anthony	United States
Support	4	Roolf	Stark, Randal	Canada

Head coach

- Steven "Flubby" Coronel

Legend:
- (I) Inactive
- (S) Suspended
- (2W) Two-way player
- Substitute
- (injured) Injury / Illness

Latest roster transaction: May 27, 2021.

=== Transactions ===
Transactions of/for players on the roster during the 2021 regular season:

- On May 24, tank player Abtin "Shredlock" Shirvani retired.
- On May 27, the Titans signed tank player Moon "ChangSik" Chang-sik.

== Standings ==
Pos	Team	Pld	W	L	Pts	PCT	MW	ML	MT	MD	Qualification
1	Dallas Fuel	16	11	5	17	0.688	40	26	3	+14	Advance to season playoffs
2	Los Angeles Gladiators	16	11	5	14	0.688	41	21	0	+20	Advance to season playoffs
3	Atlanta Reign	16	11	5	13	0.688	41	21	0	+20	Advance to season playoffs
4	San Francisco Shock	16	12	4	12	0.750	43	24	2	+19	Advance to play-ins
5	Houston Outlaws	16	11	5	11	0.688	34	24	3	+10	Advance to play-ins
6	Washington Justice	16	9	7	9	0.563	29	26	2	+3	Advance to play-ins
7	Toronto Defiant	16	9	7	9	0.563	31	31	0	0	Advance to play-ins
8	Paris Eternal	16	8	8	8	0.500	32	32	2	0	Advance to play-ins
9	Boston Uprising	16	7	9	7	0.438	27	31	1	−4	Advance to play-ins
10	Florida Mayhem	16	5	11	6	0.313	26	38	2	−12	
11	London Spitfire	16	1	15	1	0.063	12	47	1	−35	
12	Vancouver Titans	16	1	15	1	0.063	10	45	0	−35	

Source: The Overwatch League
Rules for classification: 1) points; 2) winning percentage (including tournaments); 3) regular season wins; 4) regular season map differential

== Game log ==
=== Regular season ===
2021 game log
May Melee

Qualifier match 1	April 17	Toronto Defiant	3	–	1	Vancouver Titans	Online
	12:00 noon PDT	Details					
		2	Busan			1	
		3	Eichenwalde			2	
		1	Watchpoint: Gibraltar			2	
		2	Hanamura			1	

Qualifier match 2	April 18	Florida Mayhem	3	–	1	Vancouver Titans	Online
	1:30 pm PDT	Details					
		2	Nepal			1	
		3	King's Row			2	
		1	Havana			2	
		2	Volskaya Industries			1	

Qualifier match 3	April 23	Paris Eternal	3	–	1	Vancouver Titans	Online
	12:00 noon PDT	Details					
		0	Oasis			2	
		2	Watchpoint: Gibraltar			1	
		6	Hanamura			5	
		3	Eichenwalde			2	

Qualifier match 4	April 25	Vancouver Titans	1	–	3	Washington Justice	Online
	3:00 pm PDT	Details					
		0	Lijiang Tower			2	
		1	Dorado			3	
		3	Temple of Anubis			2	
		0	Blizzard World			1	

June Joust

Qualifier match 1	May 28	Los Angeles Gladiators	3	–	0	Vancouver Titans	Online
	1:30 pm PDT	Details					
		2	Ilios			0	
		3	Junkertown			2	
		3	Hanamura			2	

Qualifier match 2	May 30	Vancouver Titans	0	–	3	Atlanta Reign	Online
	1:30 pm PDT	Details					
		0	Nepal			2	
		0	Dorado			3	
		0	Temple of Anubis			2	

Qualifier match 3	June 04	San Francisco Shock	3	–	0	Vancouver Titans	Online
	1:30 pm PDT	Details					
		2	Lijiang Tower			0	
		1	Hanamura			0	
		3	Hollywood			0	

Qualifier match 4	June 05	Vancouver Titans	0	–	3	Dallas Fuel	Online
	1:30 pm PDT	Details					
		0	Oasis			2	
		0	Volskaya Industries			2	
		0	Numbani			3	

Summer Showdown

Qualifier match 1	June 26	Vancouver Titans	1	–	3	Boston Uprising	Online
	3:00 pm PDT	Details					
		0	Busan			2	
		2	Hollywood			1	
		1	Watchpoint: Gibraltar			2	
		1	Hanamura			2	

Qualifier match 2	June 27	Toronto Defiant	3	–	0	Vancouver Titans	Online
	3:00 pm PDT	Details					
		2	Oasis			1	
		3	Eichenwalde			0	
		2	Route 66			0	

Qualifier match 3	July 03	Paris Eternal	3	–	0	Vancouver Titans	Online
	12:00 noon PDT	Details					
		2	Lijiang Tower			0	
		3	Junkertown			0	
		2	Volskaya Industries			1	

Qualifier match 4	July 04	Vancouver Titans	0	–	3	Houston Outlaws	Online
	1:30 pm PDT	Details					
		0	Nepal			2	
		2	Watchpoint: Gibraltar			3	
		1	Hanamura			2	

Countdown Cup

Qualifier match 1	August 06	Vancouver Titans	3	–	0	Boston Uprising	Online
	1:30 pm PDT	Details					
		2	Busan			1	
		2	Havana			1	
		5	Numbani			4	

Qualifier match 2	August 08	Vancouver Titans	0	–	3	Washington Justice	Online
	3:00 pm PDT	Details					
		0	Nepal			2	
		2	Route 66			3	
		2	Temple of Anubis			3	

Qualifier match 3	August 13	San Francisco Shock	3	–	0	Vancouver Titans	Online
	1:30 pm PDT	Details					
		2	Oasis			0	
		2	Volskaya Industries			1	
		3	King's Row			0	

Qualifier match 4	August 14	London Spitfire	3	–	2	Vancouver Titans	Online
	12:00 noon PDT	Details					
		2	Lijiang Tower			0	
		1	Temple of Anubis			2	
		1	Blizzard World			2	
		3	Rialto			2	
		2	Oasis			0	

2021 season schedule
