= 2021 Boston Uprising season =

- Head coach: Kim "Lori" Seung-hyun
- Owner: Robert Kraft
- Region: West

Results
- Record: 7–9 (.438)
- Place: West: 9th; League: 15th
- May Melee: Did not qualify
- June Joust: Regional semifinals
- Summer Showdown: Regional semifinals
- Countdown Cup: Did not qualify
- Season Playoffs: Did not qualify
- Total Earnings: $0

The 2021 Boston Uprising season was the Boston Uprising's fourth season in the Overwatch League and their first under head coach Kim "Lori" Seung-hyun. Boston failed to qualify for any of the four midseason tournaments and missed out on the season playoffs for the third consecutive season.

== Preceding offseason ==
=== Organizational changes ===
In September 2020, assistant coach Rollon "Mini" Hamelin and analyst Jake "Spackle" Connell left the organization. A month later, the Uprising transitioned 2020 head coach Vytis "Mineral" Lasaitis into a management position. In his replacement, Boston signed Kim "Lori" Seung-hyun, who was previously the head coach of Korean Overwatch Contenders team World Game Star Phoenix, as the team's new head coach.

=== Roster changes ===
The Uprising entered the free agency with three free agents, all three of which became free agents due to the Uprising not exercising the option to retain the player for another year.

==== Acquisitions ====
The Uprising's first offseason acquisition was Hong "im37" Jun-ui, a damage player who had won the most recent Overwatch Contenders Korea title with WGS Phoenix while on a loan from Boston's academy team Uprising Academy, on November 12, 2020. The team's next acquisition was on December 2, 2020, with the signing of former Shanghai Dragons tank player Seo "Stand1" Ji-won. Two weeks later, the Uprising signed Terrance "Soon" Tarlier, a damage player who had played with the Paris Eternal from 2019 to 2020. In February, the Uprising signed two more players; on February 3, 2021, they signed Kim "Valentine" Byeong-ju, a damage player, and Kim "Faith" Hong-gyu, a support player, both of whom won Overwatch Contenders Korea on WGS Phoenix the previous season. Boston's final acquisition of the offseason came hours before the 2021 regular season began; on April 16, 2021, they signed Yun "GaeBullSsi" Young-sun, an off-tank player from their academy team Uprising Academy who would likely split playing time with the Uprising's established off-tank player Leyton "Punk" Gilchrist.

==== Departures ====
The first departure of the team was tank player Park "Axxiom" Min-sub, who underwent a medical procedure in March 2020 and missed most of the 2020 season, on November 12, 2020. The Uprising parted ways with damage player Terrance "Soon" Tarlier, who had signed with the team earlier in the offseason, on April 6, 2021, due to visa issues.

None of the Uprising's free agents returned, all three of which signing with other teams, beginning with damage player Min "Jerry" Tae-hee signing with the Washington Justice on November 9, 2020. On December 7, 2020, support player Kobe "Halo" Hamand signed with collegiate team Maryville Esports. The following month, on January 12, 2021, tank player Michael "Mikeyy" Konicki signed with collegiate team Harrisburg University Storm.

== Regular season ==
The Uprising opened the season on April 24 with a 0–3 loss to the Los Angeles Gladiators in the May Melee qualifiers. The following day, they faced the Dallas Fuel; again, they team was swept 0–3. Already eliminated from May Melee contention, the team's final qualifier match was against the London Spitfire. After a back-and-forth match, the Uprising won their first match of the season with a 3–2 victory, giving them an overall 1–3 record.

For the June Joust qualifiers, Boston made a starting roster change, starting rookie Yun "GaeBullSsi" Young-sun as one of the team's tank players. The Uprising's first match was against the Toronto Defiant on May 22; they swept the Defiant 3–0 thanks in part to "solid support play" from support player Sang-min "Myunb0ng" Seo. The following day, they faced the Washington Justice; the Uprising swept the Justice 3–0 in what was the fastest match of the 2021 season up to that point. The team advanced to the June Joust regional knockouts, but fell in the first round to the Atlanta Reign.

== Final roster ==
2021 Boston Uprising roster
Players
Coaches

Role	No.	Handle	Name	Nationality
Damage	1	im37	Hong Jin-ui	South Korea
Damage	17	Colourhex	Birse, Kelsey	New Zealand
Damage	14	Valentine	Kim Byeong-ju	South Korea
Tank	25	Fusions	Bosworth, Cameron	United Kingdom
Tank	3	Stand1	Seo Ji-won	South Korea
Tank	9	GaeBullSsi	Yun Young-sun	South Korea
Tank	5	Punk	Gilchrist, Leyton	Australia
Support	13	Myunbong	Seo Sang-min	South Korea
Support	33	Faith	Kim Hong-gyu	South Korea

Head coach

- Kim "Lori" Seung-hyun

Legend:
- (I) Inactive
- (S) Suspended
- (2W) Two-way player
- Substitute
- (injured) Injury / Illness

Latest roster transaction: April 16, 2021.

== Standings ==
Pos	Team	Pld	W	L	Pts	PCT	MW	ML	MT	MD	Qualification
1	Dallas Fuel	16	11	5	17	0.688	40	26	3	+14	Advance to season playoffs
2	Los Angeles Gladiators	16	11	5	14	0.688	41	21	0	+20	Advance to season playoffs
3	Atlanta Reign	16	11	5	13	0.688	41	21	0	+20	Advance to season playoffs
4	San Francisco Shock	16	12	4	12	0.750	43	24	2	+19	Advance to play-ins
5	Houston Outlaws	16	11	5	11	0.688	34	24	3	+10	Advance to play-ins
6	Washington Justice	16	9	7	9	0.563	29	26	2	+3	Advance to play-ins
7	Toronto Defiant	16	9	7	9	0.563	31	31	0	0	Advance to play-ins
8	Paris Eternal	16	8	8	8	0.500	32	32	2	0	Advance to play-ins
9	Boston Uprising	16	7	9	7	0.438	27	31	1	−4	Advance to play-ins
10	Florida Mayhem	16	5	11	6	0.313	26	38	2	−12	
11	London Spitfire	16	1	15	1	0.063	12	47	1	−35	
12	Vancouver Titans	16	1	15	1	0.063	10	45	0	−35	

Source: The Overwatch League
Rules for classification: 1) points; 2) winning percentage (including tournaments); 3) regular season wins; 4) regular season map differential

== Game log ==
=== Regular season ===
2021 game log
May Melee

Qualifier match 1	April 24	Boston Uprising	0	–	3	Los Angeles Gladiators	Online
	4:30 pm EDT	Details					
		1	Oasis			2	
		2	Watchpoint: Gibraltar			3	
		1	Hanamura			2	

Qualifier match 2	April 25	Boston Uprising	0	–	3	Dallas Fuel	Online
	4:30 pm EDT	Details					
		0	Nepal			2	
		1	Havana			2	
		3	Volskaya Industries			4	

Qualifier match 3	April 29	Washington Justice	3	–	1	Boston Uprising	Online
	4:30 pm EDT	Details					
		2	Busan			1	
		3	Volskaya Industries			2	
		1	King's Row			2	
		3	Havana			2	

Qualifier match 4	April 30	Boston Uprising	3	–	2	London Spitfire	Online
	3:00 pm EDT	Details					
		2	Ilios			1	
		1	Temple of Anubis			2	
		3	Blizzard World			2	
		0	Dorado			1	
		2	Lijiang Tower			1	

June Joust

Qualifier match 1	May 22	Toronto Defiant	0	–	3	Boston Uprising	Online
	6:00 pm EDT	Details					
		0	Ilios			2	
		2	Numbani			3	
		3	Rialto			4	

Qualifier match 2	May 23	Washington Justice	0	–	3	Boston Uprising	Online
	4:30 pm EDT	Details					
		0	Lijiang Tower			2	
		1	Hollywood			2	
		0	Junkertown			1	

Qualifier match 3	June 03	Boston Uprising	2	–	3	Paris Eternal	Online
	3:00 pm EDT	Details					
		2	Nepal			1	
		1	Volskaya Industries			2	
		1	Numbani			0	
		1	Rialto			3	
		1	Busan			2	

Qualifier match 4	June 04	Boston Uprising	1	–	3	Los Angeles Gladiators	Online
	3:00 pm EDT	Details					
		2	Oasis			0	
		1	Temple of Anubis			2	
		1	Eichenwalde			2	
		1	Dorado			2	

Regional semifinals	June 06	Boston Uprising	0	–	3	Atlanta Reign	Online
	4:30 pm EDT	Details					
		0	Lijiang Tower			2	
		1	Temple of Anubis			2	
		3	Numbani			5	

Summer Showdown

Qualifier match 1	June 26	Vancouver Titans	1	–	3	Boston Uprising	Online
	6:00 pm EDT	Details					
		0	Busan			2	
		2	Hollywood			1	
		1	Watchpoint: Gibraltar			2	
		1	Hanamura			2	

Qualifier match 2	June 27	Boston Uprising	3	–	0	Florida Mayhem	Online
	4:30 pm EDT	Details					
		2	Nepal			1	
		3	King's Row			3	
		3	Junkertown			2	
		3	Volskaya Industries			2	

Qualifier match 3	July 08	Boston Uprising	3	–	0	Houston Outlaws	Online
	4:30 pm EDT	Details					
		2	Ilios			0	
		2	Temple of Anubis			1	
		2	Eichenwalde			1	

Qualifier match 4	July 10	Atlanta Reign	3	–	0	Boston Uprising	Online
	3:00 pm EDT	Details					
		2	Lijiang Tower			0	
		2	Hanamura			1	
		3	Hollywood			2	

Regional semifinals	July 11	Los Angeles Gladiators	3	–	0	Boston Uprising	Online
	4:30 pm EDT	Details					
		2	Ilios			0	
		2	Hanamura			0	
		4	King's Row			3	

Countdown Cup

Qualifier match 1	July 31	Boston Uprising	3	–	1	Paris Eternal	Online
	3:00 pm EDT	Details					
		2	Ilios			0	
		0	King's Row			3	
		2	Rialto			1	
		3	Volskaya Industries			2	

Qualifier match 2	August 01	San Francisco Shock	3	–	1	Boston Uprising	Online
	4:30 pm EDT	Details					
		2	Lijiang Tower			1	
		2	Blizzard World			1	
		1	Route 66			2	
		2	Temple of Anubis			1	

Qualifier match 3	August 06	Vancouver Titans	3	–	0	Boston Uprising	Online
	4:30 pm EDT	Details					
		2	Busan			1	
		2	Havana			1	
		5	Numbani			4	

Qualifier match 4	August 08	Boston Uprising	1	–	3	Florida Mayhem	Online
	3:00 pm EDT	Details					
		1	Nepal			2	
		4	Route 66			3	
		0	Volskaya Industries			1	
		2	Blizzard World			3	

2021 season schedule

=== Postseason ===
2021 playoff game log
West Play-ins

Semifinals	September 4	Boston Uprising	0	–	3	Toronto Defiant	Online
	5:30 pm EDT	Details					
		1	Busan			2	
		1	Temple of Anubis			2	
		1	King's Row			3	
