= 2021 London Spitfire season =

- Head coach: Justin "reprize" Hand (Released 21 May); Mads "fischer" Jehg
- General manager: Ysabel "Noukky" Müller
- Owner: Jack Etienne
- Region: West

Results
- Record: 1–15 (.063)
- Place: West: 11th; League: 18th
- May Melee: Did not qualify
- June Joust: Did not qualify
- Summer Showdown: Did not qualify
- Countdown Cup: Did not qualify
- Season Playoffs: Did not qualify
- Total Earnings: $0

The 2021 London Spitfire season will be the fourth season of the London Spitfire's existence in the Overwatch League and the team's first under head coach Justin "reprize" Hand.

== Preceding offseason ==
=== Roster changes ===
The Spitfire entered the free agency with no free agents, although eight players became free agents beginning due to mutual agreements with the players and the Spitfire prior to free agency beginning.

==== Acquisitions ====
The Spitfire's first offseason acquisition was on 26 December 2020 with the signing of Jeffrey "Blasé" Tsang, a damage player and four-year veteran of the league that competed with the Houston Outlaws in the 2020 season. The team promoted support player Riku "Ripa" Toivanen from their Overwatch Contenders academy team British Hurricane on 4 January. The next day, the Spitfire promoted three more players from British Hurricane: support player Kristian "Kellex" Keller, tank player Hadi "Hadi" Daniel Bleinagel, and tank player Mikkel "Molf1g" Djernes. The Spitfire signed two more players the following day: Dominic "Hybrid" Grove, a damage player who competed with Overwatch Contenders team Team Doge the previous season, and William "SparkR" Andersson, a damage player from British Hurricane who would not become eligible to play until June 2021 due to age restrictions. London's final offseason acquisition was on 8 February with the signing of Johannes "Shax" Nielsen, a damage player and hitscan specialist who signed with the Los Angeles Valiant in the offseason but was released after the team dropped its entire roster.

==== Departures ====
The Spitfire released seven of its players from their contracts on 15 October, bringing validity to rumors that the team was preparing to field a roster composed entirely of Western players. The team dropped damage players Jung "Although" Hyeon-wook, Park "Babel" Sang-jun, and Lee "Schwi" Dong-jae; tank players Cho "Clestyn" Geon-hee and Kim "Jihun" Ji-hun; and support players Lee "Highly" Sung-hyuk and Jeong "Krillin" Young-hoon. Two days later, London released tank player Choi "Jmac" Dae-han, London continued its roster overhaul in November, releasing tank player Shin "Bernar" Se-won and support player Lim "SanGuiNar" Gyu-min on 17 November. Four days later, they released damage player Lim "Glister" Gil-seong. The team's final departure of the offseason was support player Kim "Fuze" Tae-hoon, who was released on 4 January 2021.

== Regular season ==
On 21 May, head coach Justin "reprize" Hand retired; in his replacement, the Spitfire promoted assistant coach Mads "fischer" Jehg to head coach.

== Final roster ==
2021 London Spitfire roster
Players
Coaches

Role	No.	Handle	Name	Nationality
Damage	25	SparkR (2W)	Andersson, William	Sweden
Damage	5	Hybrid (2W)	Grove, Dominic	United Kingdom
Damage	66	blasé	Tsang, Jeffrey	United States
Damage	10	Shax	Nielsen, Johannes	Denmark
Tank	11	Hadi	Bleinagel, Hadi Daniel	Germany
Tank	2	Molf1g	Djernes, Mikkel	Denmark
Support	9	Kellex	Keller, Kristian	Denmark
Support	55	Ripa	Toivanen, Riku	Finland

Head coach

- Mads "fischer" Jehg

Legend:
- (I) Inactive
- (S) Suspended
- (2W) Two-way player
- Substitute
- (injured) Injury / Illness

Latest roster transaction: 7 February 2021.

== Standings ==
Pos	Team	Pld	W	L	Pts	PCT	MW	ML	MT	MD	Qualification
1	Dallas Fuel	16	11	5	17	0.688	40	26	3	+14	Advance to season playoffs
2	Los Angeles Gladiators	16	11	5	14	0.688	41	21	0	+20	Advance to season playoffs
3	Atlanta Reign	16	11	5	13	0.688	41	21	0	+20	Advance to season playoffs
4	San Francisco Shock	16	12	4	12	0.750	43	24	2	+19	Advance to play-ins
5	Houston Outlaws	16	11	5	11	0.688	34	24	3	+10	Advance to play-ins
6	Washington Justice	16	9	7	9	0.563	29	26	2	+3	Advance to play-ins
7	Toronto Defiant	16	9	7	9	0.563	31	31	0	0	Advance to play-ins
8	Paris Eternal	16	8	8	8	0.500	32	32	2	0	Advance to play-ins
9	Boston Uprising	16	7	9	7	0.438	27	31	1	−4	Advance to play-ins
10	Florida Mayhem	16	5	11	6	0.313	26	38	2	−12	
11	London Spitfire	16	1	15	1	0.063	12	47	1	−35	
12	Vancouver Titans	16	1	15	1	0.063	10	45	0	−35	

Source: The Overwatch League
Rules for classification: 1) points; 2) winning percentage (including tournaments); 3) regular season wins; 4) regular season map differential

== Game log ==
=== Regular season ===
2021 game log
May Melee

Qualifier match 1	23 April	Los Angeles Gladiators	3	–	0	London Spitfire	Online
	8:30 pm GMT	Details					
		2	Busan			0	
		3	Havana			1	
		2	Volskaya Industries			1	

Qualifier match 2	25 April	Houston Outlaws	3	–	0	London Spitfire	Online
	7:00 pm GMT	Details					
		2	Oasis			0	
		2	Watchpoint: Gibraltar			1	
		2	Hanamura			1	

Qualifier match 3	30 April	Boston Uprising	3	–	2	London Spitfire	Online
	7:00 pm GMT	Details					
		2	Ilios			1	
		1	Temple of Anubis			2	
		3	Blizzard World			2	
		0	Dorado			1	
		2	Lijiang Tower			1	

Qualifier match 4	1 May	London Spitfire	1	–	3	Toronto Defiant	Online
	8:30 pm GMT	Details					
		1	Lijiang Tower			2	
		3	Volskaya Industries			2	
		1	King's Row			2	
		2	Havana			3	

June Joust

Qualifier match 1	21 May	London Spitfire	1	–	3	Florida Mayhem	Online
	8:30 pm GMT	Details					
		0	Ilios			2	
		5	Numbani			4	
		2	Rialto			3	
		3	Volskaya Industries			4	

Qualifier match 2	23 May	Atlanta Reign	3	–	0	London Spitfire	Online
	7:00 pm GMT	Details					
		2	Lijiang Tower			0	
		3	Eichenwalde			2	
		3	Dorado			1	

Qualifier match 3	28 May	London Spitfire	0	–	3	Dallas Fuel	Online
	7:00 pm GMT	Details					
		0	Nepal			2	
		1	Junkertown			3	
		2	Hanamura			3	

Qualifier match 4	29 May	Houston Outlaws	3	–	0	London Spitfire	Online
	7:00 pm GMT	Details					
		2	Oasis			0	
		3	Dorado			2	
		3	Temple of Anubis			2	

Summer Showdown

Qualifier match 1	25 June	London Spitfire	1	–	3	Paris Eternal	Online
	7:00 pm GMT	Details					
		2	Busan			0	
		0	Hollywood			1	
		1	Watchpoint: Gibraltar			3	
		1	Hanamura			2	

Qualifier match 2	26 June	London Spitfire	2	–	3	San Francisco Shock	Online
	7:00 pm GMT	Details					
		2	Oasis			1	
		1	Eichenwalde			3	
		2	Route 66			1	
		1	Temple of Anubis			2	
		1	Nepal			2	

Qualifier match 3	8 July	Atlanta Reign	3	–	0	London Spitfire	Online
	7:00 pm GMT	Details					
		2	Ilios			1	
		3	Volskaya Industries			2	
		1	King's Row			0	

Qualifier match 4	9 July	Washington Justice	3	–	0	London Spitfire	Online
	7:00 pm GMT	Details					
		2	Lijiang Tower			0	
		1	Temple of Anubis			0	
		3	Eichenwalde			2	

Countdown Cup

Qualifier match 1	6 August	London Spitfire	1	–	3	Toronto Defiant	Online
	7:00 pm GMT	Details					
		1	Ilios			2	
		1	Rialto			0	
		1	Temple of Anubis			2	
		2	Numbani			3	

Qualifier match 2	7 August	Dallas Fuel	3	–	1	London Spitfire	Online
	7:00 pm GMT	Details					
		2	Nepal			0	
		0	Route 66			3	
		3	Volskaya Industries			3	
		3	King's Row			0	
		2	Busan			1	

Qualifier match 3	13 August	London Spitfire	0	–	3	Paris Eternal	Online
	7:00 pm GMT	Details					
		0	Busan			2	
		0	Hanamura			2	
		0	Numbani			2	

Qualifier match 4	14 August	London Spitfire	3	–	2	Vancouver Titans	Online
	7:00 pm GMT	Details					
		2	Lijiang Tower			0	
		1	Temple of Anubis			2	
		1	Blizzard World			2	
		3	Rialto			2	
		2	Oasis			0	

2021 season schedule
