= 2021 Atlanta Reign season =

- Head coach: Brad "Sephy" Rajani
- General manager: Paul Hamilton
- Owner: Atlanta Esports Ventures
- Region: West

Results
- Record: 11–5 (.688)
- Place: West: 3rd; League: 5th
- May Melee: Did not qualify
- June Joust: Lower finals
- Summer Showdown: Lower round 1
- Countdown Cup: Lower finals
- Season Playoffs: Grand Finals
- Total Earnings: $790,000

The 2021 Atlanta Reign season was the Atlanta Reign's third season in the Overwatch League and the team's third under head coach Brad "Sephy" Rajani. The team qualified for three of the four midseason tournaments but fell short of reaching the finals each time. For the third consecutive season, the team qualified for the season playoffs. The Reign appeared in the 2021 Grand Finals, the franchise's first Grand Finals appearance, but lost to the Shanghai Dragons, 0–4. Rookie damage player Oh "Pelican" Se-hyun was named the league's Rookie of the Year.

== Preceding offseason ==
=== Roster changes ===
The Reign entered the free agency with six free agents, four of which became free agents due to the Reign not exercising the option to retain the player for another year.

==== Acquisitions ====
The Reign's first offseason acquisition was Oh "Pelican" Se-hyun, a damage player who had recently won Overwatch Contenders Korea with team O2 Blast, on November 13, 2020. Atlanta did not sign another player until February; on February 11, 2021, they signed Kai "Kai" Collins, a damage player who had signed with the Los Angeles Valiant in late 2020 but was released after the team dropped all of their players.

==== Departures ====
None of the Reign's free agents returned, three of which signing with other teams, beginning with damage player Jeong "Erster" Jun signing with the Shanghai Dragons on November 17, 2020. The Reign lost two more players in Tank player Nathan "Frd" Goebel and support player Anthony "Fire" King, both of whom signed with the Vancouver Titans on December 1, 2020. On January 4, 2021, support player Dusttin "Dogman" Bowerman announced his retirement. Two other free agents, damage player Garrett "Saucy" Roland and tank player Park "Pokpo" Hyeon-jun, did not sign with another team in the 2021 offseason. Outside of their free agents, the team released damage player Hugo "SharP" Sahlberg on February 10, 2021, giving life to rumors that the team was looking to sign former Los Angeles Valiant damage player Kai "Kai" Collins.

== Regular season ==
The Reign began their 2021 season on April 17, playing against the Florida Mayhem in the May Melee qualifiers; they lost their opener 1–3. Atlanta faced the Toronto Defiant the following day; despite starting the match with a 2–0 lead, the Reign lost the match 2–3. The Reign found their first win of the season on April 29 with a 3–0 sweep over the Paris Eternal. Atlanta's final match in the May Melee qualifiers was on May 1 against the San Francisco Shock. Needing a win to advance to the knockout round, Atlanta opened the match with a 1–0 lead, thanks in part to a strong performance by rookie damage player Se-hyun "Pelican" Oh playing as Mei. However, they lost three of the following four maps to lose the match 2–3. The 1–3 record in the qualifiers failed to advance the Reign to the regional knockouts.

The team found success in the following tournament cycle, the June Joust; after going 3–1 in the qualifiers, the Reign defeated the San Francisco Shock in the regional knockout finals to advance to the June Joust tournament. However, the team lost in the lower bracket finals to the Shanghai Dragons by a 0–3 scoreline.

Atlanta found similar results in the Summer Showdown, defeating the Los Angeles Gladiators in the regional finals to advance to their second consecutive midseason tournament. The Reign ultimately fell in the first round of the lower bracket in a 2–3 loss to the Dallas Fuel.

In the final tournament cycle, the Countdown Cup, the Reign qualified for their third consecutive tournament appearance. However, Reign rookie Oh "Pelican" Se-hyun suffered a collapsed lung prior to the tournament. Atlanta fell in the tournament to the Chengdu Hunters by a score of 0–3. The team finished the regular season with 11 wins, 5 losses, 13 league points, and the fifth seed in the season playoffs.

Oh "Pelican" Se-hyun was awarded the league's Rookie of the Year award and was an MVP candidate for the 2021 regular season.

== Playoffs ==
In the first round of the 2021 season playoffs, the Reign fell to the third-seeded Chengdu Hunters, 2–3, sending Atlanta to the lower bracket of the tournament. Atlanta ran through the lower bracket, defeating the eighth-seeded Washington Justice, 3–0, the fourth-seeded Los Angeles Gladiators, 3–2 the sixth-seeded San Francisco Shock, 3–1, and the second-seeded Dallas Fuel, 3–1. With a run through the lower bracket, the Reign advanced to the 2021 Overwatch League Grand Finals. In the finals, the Reign faced the top-seeded Shanghai Dragons; Atlanta was swept 0–4 in the matchup.

== Final roster ==
2021 Atlanta Reign roster
Players
Coaches

Role	No.	Handle	Name	Nationality
Damage	7	Edison	Kim Tae-hoon	South Korea
Damage	75	Pelican	Oh Se-hyun	South Korea
Damage	17	Kai	Collins, Kai	United Kingdom
Tank	1	Gator	Scott, Blake	United States
Tank	8	Hawk	Domecq, Xander	United States
Support	20	Ir1s	Kim Seung-hyun	South Korea
Support	66	Masaa	Kantanen, Petja	Finland

Head coach

- Brad "Sephy" Rajani

Legend:
- (I) Inactive
- (S) Suspended
- (2W) Two-way player
- Substitute
- (injured) Injury / Illness

Latest roster transaction: February 11, 2021.

== Standings ==
Pos	Team	Pld	W	L	Pts	PCT	MW	ML	MT	MD	Qualification
1	Dallas Fuel	16	11	5	17	0.688	40	26	3	+14	Advance to season playoffs
2	Los Angeles Gladiators	16	11	5	14	0.688	41	21	0	+20	Advance to season playoffs
3	Atlanta Reign	16	11	5	13	0.688	41	21	0	+20	Advance to season playoffs
4	San Francisco Shock	16	12	4	12	0.750	43	24	2	+19	Advance to play-ins
5	Houston Outlaws	16	11	5	11	0.688	34	24	3	+10	Advance to play-ins
6	Washington Justice	16	9	7	9	0.563	29	26	2	+3	Advance to play-ins
7	Toronto Defiant	16	9	7	9	0.563	31	31	0	0	Advance to play-ins
8	Paris Eternal	16	8	8	8	0.500	32	32	2	0	Advance to play-ins
9	Boston Uprising	16	7	9	7	0.438	27	31	1	−4	Advance to play-ins
10	Florida Mayhem	16	5	11	6	0.313	26	38	2	−12	
11	London Spitfire	16	1	15	1	0.063	12	47	1	−35	
12	Vancouver Titans	16	1	15	1	0.063	10	45	0	−35	

Source: The Overwatch League
Rules for classification: 1) points; 2) winning percentage (including tournaments); 3) regular season wins; 4) regular season map differential

== Game log ==
=== Regular season ===
2021 game log
May Melee

Qualifier match 1	April 17	Atlanta Reign	1	–	3	Florida Mayhem	Online
	4:30 pm EDT	Details					
		1	Ilios			2	
		2	Eichenwalde			1	
		0	Watchpoint: Gibraltar			1	
		1	Hanamura			2	

Qualifier match 2	April 18	Toronto Defiant	3	–	2	Atlanta Reign	Online
	6:00 pm EDT	Details					
		0	Nepal			2	
		2	Blizzard World			3	
		3	Dorado			2	
		2	Temple of Anubis			1	
		2	Busan			0	

Qualifier match 3	April 29	Paris Eternal	0	–	3	Atlanta Reign	Online
	3:00 pm EDT	Details					
		1	Busan			2	
		2	Hanamura			3	
		2	Eichenwalde			3	

Qualifier match 4	May 01	San Francisco Shock	3	–	2	Atlanta Reign	Online
	6:00 pm EDT	Details					
		0	Oasis			2	
		3	Volskaya Industries			2	
		2	King's Row			3	
		3	Havana			0	
		2	Nepal			0	

June Joust

Qualifier match 1	May 22	Houston Outlaws	1	–	3	Atlanta Reign	Online
	4:30 pm EDT	Details					
		2	Ilios			0	
		1	Hollywood			3	
		2	Junkertown			3	
		0	Hanamura			2	

Qualifier match 2	May 23	Atlanta Reign	3	–	0	London Spitfire	Online
	3:00 pm EDT	Details					
		2	Lijiang Tower			0	
		3	Eichenwalde			2	
		3	Dorado			1	

Qualifier match 3	May 29	Atlanta Reign	1	–	3	Los Angeles Gladiators	Online
	6:00 pm EDT	Details					
		1	Busan			2	
		3	Rialto			4	
		1	Volskaya Industries			0	
		2	Numbani			3	

Qualifier match 4	May 30	Vancouver Titans	0	–	3	Atlanta Reign	Online
	4:30 pm EDT	Details					
		0	Nepal			2	
		0	Dorado			3	
		0	Temple of Anubis			2	

Regional semifinals	June 06	Boston Uprising	0	–	3	Atlanta Reign	Online
	4:30 pm EDT	Details					
		0	Lijiang Tower			2	
		1	Temple of Anubis			2	
		3	Numbani			5	

Regional finals	June 06	Atlanta Reign	3	–	0	San Francisco Shock	Online
	7:15 pm EDT	Details					
		2	Nepal			0	
		2	Hanamura			1	
		4	Hollywood			3	

Tournament first round	June 10	New York Excelsior	0	–	3	Atlanta Reign	Online
	9:00 pm EDT	Details					
		0	Lijiang Tower			2	
		2	Temple of Anubis			4	
		3	Numbani			4	

Upper finals	June 11	Dallas Fuel	3	–	1	Atlanta Reign	Online
	9:00 pm EDT	Details					
		1	Nepal			2	
		3	Volskaya Industries			2	
		3	Numbani			2	
		2	Rialto			1	

Lower finals	June 12	Shanghai Dragons	3	–	0	Atlanta Reign	Online
	12:00 midnight EDT	Details					
		2	Lijiang Tower			1	
		3	Hanamura			2	
		4	Numbani			3	

Summer Showdown

Qualifier match 1	July 02	Washington Justice	0	–	3	Atlanta Reign	Online
	4:30 pm EDT	Details					
		1	Busan			2	
		0	Junkertown			1	
		2	Volskaya Industries			3	

Qualifier match 2	July 04	Atlanta Reign	2	–	3	Dallas Fuel	Online
	3:00 pm EDT	Details					
		1	Nepal			2	
		3	Route 66			1	
		0	Temple of Anubis			2	
		3	Eichenwalde			2	
		0	Busan			2	

Qualifier match 3	July 08	Atlanta Reign	3	–	0	London Spitfire	Online
	3:00 pm EDT	Details					
		2	Ilios			1	
		3	Volskaya Industries			2	
		1	King's Row			0	

Qualifier match 4	July 10	Atlanta Reign	3	–	0	Boston Uprising	Online
	3:00 pm EDT	Details					
		2	Lijiang Tower			0	
		2	Hanamura			1	
		3	Hollywood			2	

Regional finals	July 11	Los Angeles Gladiators	2	–	3	Atlanta Reign	Online
	7:50 pm EDT	Details					
		0	Lijiang Tower			2	
		1	Temple of Anubis			0	
		0	King's Row			1	
		1	Watchpoint: Gibraltar			0	
		1	Nepal			2	

Tournament first round	July 15	Atlanta Reign	0	–	3	Shanghai Dragons	Online
	11:00 pm EDT	Details					
		0	Nepal			2	
		1	Hanamura			2	
		0	King's Row			3	

Lower round 1	July 16	Atlanta Reign	2	–	3	Dallas Fuel	Online
	11:15 pm EDT	Details					
		0	Lijiang Tower			2	
		2	Hanamura			1	
		5	King's Row			6	
		3	Route 66			2	
		1	Nepal			2	

Countdown Cup

Qualifier match 1	July 31	Atlanta Reign	3	–	2	Los Angeles Gladiators	Online
	4:30 pm EDT	Details					
		2	Lijiang Tower			1	
		1	Blizzard World			2	
		3	Route 66			2	
		1	Temple of Anubis			2	
		2	Oasis			0	

Qualifier match 2	August 01	Atlanta Reign	3	–	0	Houston Outlaws	Online
	3:00 pm EDT	Details					
		2	Nepal			1	
		3	King's Row			2	
		2	Rialto			1	

Qualifier match 3	August 07	Florida Mayhem	2	–	3	Atlanta Reign	Online
	4:30 pm EDT	Details					
		0	Oasis			2	
		3	Havana			2	
		2	Hanamura			0	
		1	Numbani			3	
		1	Nepal			2	

Qualifier match 4	August 08	Atlanta Reign	3	–	1	Dallas Fuel	Online
	4:30 pm EDT	Details					
		2	Busan			0	
		4	Rialto			3	
		3	Temple of Anubis			4	
		3	Blizzard World			0	

Regional finals	August 15	Toronto Defiant	1	–	3	Atlanta Reign	Online
	6:15 pm EDT	Details					
		1	Busan			2	
		3	Volskaya Industries			3	
		3	King's Row			5	
		1	Route 66			0	
		1	Oasis			2	

Tournament first round	August 19	Seoul Dynasty	1	–	3	Atlanta Reign	Online
	9:00 pm EDT	Details					
		2	Busan			0	
		2	Hanamura			3	
		4	Numbani			5	
		1	Route 66			3	

Upper finals	August 20	Los Angeles Gladiators	3	–	0	Atlanta Reign	Online
	9:00 pm EDT	Details					
		2	Oasis			0	
		4	Hanamura			2	
		3	King's Row			0	

Lower finals	August 21	Atlanta Reign	0	–	3	Chengdu Hunters	Online
	12:00 midnight EDT	Details					
		1	Ilios			2	
		1	Hanamura			2	
		1	Blizzard World			2	

2021 season schedule

=== Postseason ===
2021 playoff game log
Season Playoffs

Upper round 1	September 22	Atlanta Reign	2	–	3	Chengdu Hunters	Online
	1:30 am EDT	Details					
		2	Nepal			0	
		3	Temple of Anubis			4	
		4	King's Row			3	
		2	Dorado			3	
		0	Oasis			2	

Lower round 1	September 22	Washington Justice	0	–	3	Atlanta Reign	Online
	7:00 pm EDT	Details					
		0	Nepal			2	
		0	Temple of Anubis			2	
		1	King's Row			3	

Lower round 2	September 23	Atlanta Reign	3	–	2	Los Angeles Gladiators	Online
	7:00 pm EDT	Details					
		0	Ilios			2	
		3	Hanamura			2	
		5	King's Row			4	
		1	Dorado			2	
		2	Nepal			0	

Lower round 3	September 24	San Francisco Shock	1	–	3	Atlanta Reign	Online
	9:00 pm EDT	Details					
		2	Nepal			0	
		2	Hanamura			3	
		1	King's Row			3	
		2	Havana			3	

Lower final	September 24	Atlanta Reign	3	–	1	Dallas Fuel	Online
	10:30 pm EDT	Details					
		1	Lijiang Tower			2	
		2	Hanamura			1	
		4	King's Row			3	
		3	Dorado			2	

Grand Finals	September 25	Atlanta Reign	0	–	4	Shanghai Dragons	Online
	9:00 pm EDT	Details					
		0	Ilios			2	
		2	Hanamura			3	
		5	King's Row			6	
		2	Havana			3	
