= 2021 Houston Outlaws season =

- Head coach: Harsha Bandi; Choi "Junkbuck" Jaewon
- General manager: Matt Iorio
- Owner: Beasley Media Group
- Region: West

Results
- Record: 11–5 (.688)
- Place: West: 6th; League: 8th
- May Melee: Regional finals
- June Joust: Regional semifinals
- Summer Showdown: Did not qualify
- Countdown Cup: Did not qualify
- Season Playoffs: Did not qualify
- Total Earnings: $0

The 2021 Houston Outlaws season was the Houston Outlaws's fourth season in the Overwatch League (OWL). Harsha Bandi, who served as the team's head coach in the 2020 season, and Choi "Junkbuck" Jaewon served as the team's co-head coaches. The Outlaws underwent major roster changes in the offseason, with six of their eight players from 2020 leaving the team. The Outlaws failed to qualify for any of the four midseason tournaments. Houston finished the regular season with an 11–5 record and a fifth-place finish in the Western region. The Outlaws qualified for the West play-in tournament; however, they lost to the Washington Justice in the play-ins and did not qualify for the season playoffs for the fourth consecutive season.

== Preceding offseason ==
=== Organizational changes ===
In October 2020, assistant coach Chris "Dream" Myrick left the organization. Additionally, the Outlaws signed former San Francisco Shock assistant coach Jae "Junkbuck" Choi to be a co-head coach along with their current head coach Harsha Bandi and promoted Matt "coolmatt" Iorio as the organization's new general manager.

=== Roster changes ===
Free agents
Position	Handle	Name	2021 team	Date signed	Notes
Damage	Blasé	Jeffrey Tsang	London Spitfire	December 26	Option declined
Support	Boink	Daniel Pence	–	–	Option declined
Damage	Danteh	Dante Cruz	Houston Outlaws	October 27	–
Support	Jecse	Lee Seung-soo	Dallas Fuel	November 10	Option declined
Damage	Linkzr	Jiri Masalin	Vancouver Titans	December 1	Option declined
Tank	Meko	Kim Tae-hong	–	–	Option declined
Tank	Muma	Austin Wilmot	–	–	Option declined
Support	Rapel	Kim Jun-keun	Dallas Fuel	October 27	Option declined
Legend Light green background indicates a player was re-signed by the Outlaws. Light red background indicates a player departed from the Outlaws.

The Outlaws entered free agency with eight free agents, seven of which became free agents due to the Outlaws not exercising the option to retain the player for another year.

==== Acquisitions ====
The Outlaws' first offseason acquisition was William "Crimzo" Hernandez, a support player coming off a season with the Dallas Fuel placing in the top three among all Overwatch League flex supports in healing, damage, and eliminations per 10 minutes, who was signed on November 24, 2020. The next day, they signed Lee "Happy" Jung-woo, a damage player and sniper specialist who played with the Guangzhou Charge for two seasons. Houston signed two rookie tank players on December 4, Shin "PIGGY" Min-jun and Cho "JJANGGU" Myung-heum, both of whom played for Talon Esports in Overwatch Contenders the previous season. Three days later, they acquired damage player Kyle "KSF" Frandanisa from the Los Angeles Valiant. The Outlaws' next acquisition was on December 11; the Outlaws signed support player Enrique "Joobi" Triana, who had been playing for Harrisburg University Storm. The signing marked the first time that a college player had been signed directly to an Overwatch League roster. Houston's final signing of the offseason was on January 21, 2021, with the signing of damage player Jacob "Jake" Lyon, a former member of the Outlaws who retired to pursue a career in casting prior in the 2020 season.

==== Departures ====
Seven of the Outlaws' eight free agents did not return, four of which signing with other teams, beginning with support player Kim "Rapel" Jun-keun signing with the Dallas Fuel on October 27, 2020. On November 10, support player Lee "Jecse" Seung-soo also signed with the Fuel. The team lost damage player Jiri "Linkzr" Masalin, who signed with the Vancouver Titans on December 1. Several weeks later, on December 26, damage player Jeffrey "Blasé" Tsang signed with the London Spitfire. Three of the Outlaws' free agents, tank player Kim "Meko" Tae-hong, tank player Austin "Muma" Wilmot, and support player Daniel "Boink" Pence did not sign with a team in the offseason.

== Regular season ==
The Outlaws began their 2021 season on April 16 in the May Melee qualifiers, playing against in-state rival Dallas Fuel in the May Melee qualifiers. After trading wins throughout the first four maps, the Outlaws won the match after taking map five. They won their next game against the defending OWL champions San Francisco Shock in a six-map series, thanks in part to a game-winning Earthshatter, Reinhardt's ultimate ability, by Myung-heum "Jjanggu" Cho to close out the series. The following week, the Outlaws faced the Paris Eternal and London Spitfire; Houston defeated both teams to finish the qualifiers with a 4–0 record. With a first-round bye, the team advanced to the finals of the regional knockouts. Facing the Fuel in the regional finals, the Outlaws were swept 0–3, ending their May Melee run.

Lacking depth in tank players, the Outlaws signed Song "Dreamer" Sanglok, a tank player who had played for the Los Angeles Valiant in the 2020 season, prior to the beginning of the June Joust qualifiers. In the following tournament cycle, the June Joust, the Outlaws finished with a 3–1 record in the qualifiers and the advanced to the regional knockouts. For the third time in the season, and the second in a regional knockout, Houston faced the Fuel in the semifinals of the regional knockouts; they were swept 0–3 and eliminated from contention.

Prior to the beginning of the Summer Showdown, the third tournament cycle of the season, the Outlaws released veteran damage player João Pedro "Hydration" Goes Telles. Houston failed to advance to the regional knockouts of the Summer Showdown after losing to the Fuel in the final qualifying match of the tournament cycle. The Outlaws found similar results in the final tournament cycle, the Countdown Cup, as they were unable to make it past the qualifiers.

With an 11–5 regular season record and 11 league points, the Outlaws finished the season in fifth place in the West region standings, qualifying them to advance directly to the finals of the West region play-in tournament. Houston faced the Washington Justice in the finals. In the first-to-three series, the match was tied 2–2 after four maps; however, the Outlaws lost the final map and were eliminated from postseason contention.

== Final roster ==
2021 Houston Outlaws roster
Players
Coaches

Role	No.	Handle	Name	Nationality
Damage	20	Happy	Lee Jung-woo	South Korea
Damage	6	Danteh	Cruz, Dante	United States
Damage	27	KSF	Frandanisa, Kyle	United States
Damage	76	Jake	Lyon, Jacob	United States
Tank	33	JJANGGU	Cho Myung-heum	South Korea
Tank	17	PIGGY	Shin Min-jun	South Korea
Tank	1	Dreamer	Song Sanglok	South Korea
Support	4	Joobi	Triana, Enrique	United States
Support	7	Crimzo	Hernandez, William	Canada

Head coach

- Harsha "Harsha" Bandi
- Jae "Junkbuck" Choi

Legend:
- (I) Inactive
- (S) Suspended
- (2W) Two-way player
- Substitute
- (injured) Injury / Illness

Roster

=== Transactions ===
Transactions of/for players on the roster during the 2021 regular season:

- On May 19, the Outlaws signed tank player Song "Dreamer" Sanglok.
- On June 28, the Outlaws released damage player João Pedro "Hydration" Goes Telles.

== Standings ==
Pos	Team	Pld	W	L	Pts	PCT	MW	ML	MT	MD	Qualification
1	Dallas Fuel	16	11	5	17	0.688	40	26	3	+14	Advance to season playoffs
2	Los Angeles Gladiators	16	11	5	14	0.688	41	21	0	+20	Advance to season playoffs
3	Atlanta Reign	16	11	5	13	0.688	41	21	0	+20	Advance to season playoffs
4	San Francisco Shock	16	12	4	12	0.750	43	24	2	+19	Advance to play-ins
5	Houston Outlaws	16	11	5	11	0.688	34	24	3	+10	Advance to play-ins
6	Washington Justice	16	9	7	9	0.563	29	26	2	+3	Advance to play-ins
7	Toronto Defiant	16	9	7	9	0.563	31	31	0	0	Advance to play-ins
8	Paris Eternal	16	8	8	8	0.500	32	32	2	0	Advance to play-ins
9	Boston Uprising	16	7	9	7	0.438	27	31	1	−4	Advance to play-ins
10	Florida Mayhem	16	5	11	6	0.313	26	38	2	−12	
11	London Spitfire	16	1	15	1	0.063	12	47	1	−35	
12	Vancouver Titans	16	1	15	1	0.063	10	45	0	−35	

Source: The Overwatch League
Rules for classification: 1) points; 2) winning percentage (including tournaments); 3) regular season wins; 4) regular season map differential

== Game log ==
=== Regular season ===
2021 game log
May Melee

Qualifier match 1	April 16	Houston Outlaws	3	–	2	Dallas Fuel	Online
	2:00 pm CDT	Details					
		2	Busan			1	
		2	King's Row			3	
		3	Havana			2	
		3	Volskaya Industries			4	
		2	Ilios			0	

Qualifier match 2	April 18	Houston Outlaws	3	–	2	San Francisco Shock	Online
	2:00 pm CDT	Details					
		2	Lijiang Tower			0	
		3	Blizzard World			3	
		1	Dorado			0	
		3	Temple of Anubis			4	
		0	Oasis			2	
		1	Havana			0	

Qualifier match 3	April 24	Houston Outlaws	3	–	1	Paris Eternal	Online
	2:00 pm CDT	Details					
		2	Nepal			0	
		4	Havana			5	
		3	Volskaya Industries			2	
		4	King's Row			3	

Qualifier match 4	April 25	Houston Outlaws	3	–	0	London Spitfire	Online
	2:00 pm CDT	Details					
		2	Oasis			0	
		2	Watchpoint: Gibraltar			1	
		2	Hanamura			1	

Regional finals	May 02	Dallas Fuel	3	–	0	Houston Outlaws	Online
	6:30 pm CDT	Details					
		2	Busan			0	
		3	Volskaya Industries			2	
		4	Blizzard World			3	

June Joust

Qualifier match 1	May 22	Houston Outlaws	1	–	3	Atlanta Reign	Online
	3:30 pm CDT	Details					
		2	Ilios			0	
		1	Hollywood			3	
		2	Junkertown			3	
		0	Hanamura			2	

Qualifier match 2	May 23	Florida Mayhem	1	–	3	Houston Outlaws	Online
	5:00 pm CDT	Details					
		2	Busan			0	
		0	Eichenwalde			3	
		3	Dorado			4	
		0	Temple of Anubis			1	

Qualifier match 3	May 29	Houston Outlaws	3	–	0	London Spitfire	Online
	2:00 pm CDT	Details					
		2	Oasis			0	
		3	Dorado			2	
		3	Temple of Anubis			2	

Qualifier match 4	May 30	Toronto Defiant	1	–	3	Houston Outlaws	Online
	2:00 pm CDT	Details					
		2	Lijiang Tower			1	
		0	Rialto			3	
		0	Volskaya Industries			2	
		0	Numbani			3	

Regional semifinals	June 06	Dallas Fuel	3	–	0	Houston Outlaws	Online
	2:00 pm CDT	Details					
		2	Busan			0	
		2	Hanamura			1	
		3	Eichenwalde			2	

Summer Showdown

Qualifier match 1	July 03	Houston Outlaws	3	–	1	San Francisco Shock	Online
	5:00 pm CDT	Details					
		1	Busan			2	
		6	Junkertown			5	
		1	Volskaya Industries			0	
		2	King's Row			1	

Qualifier match 2	July 04	Vancouver Titans	0	–	3	Houston Outlaws	Online
	3:30 pm CDT	Details					
		0	Nepal			2	
		2	Watchpoint: Gibraltar			3	
		1	Hanamura			2	

Qualifier match 3	July 08	Boston Uprising	3	–	0	Houston Outlaws	Online
	3:30 pm CDT	Details					
		2	Ilios			0	
		2	Temple of Anubis			1	
		2	Eichenwalde			1	

Qualifier match 4	July 09	Dallas Fuel	3	–	0	Houston Outlaws	Online
	5:00 pm CDT	Details					
		2	Oasis			0	
		2	Hanamura			2	
		2	Hollywood			1	
		2	Watchpoint: Gibraltar			1	

Countdown Cup

Qualifier match 1	July 30	Houston Outlaws	3	–	0	Washington Justice	Online
	3:30 pm CDT	Details					
		2	Ilios			0	
		3	Blizzard World			2	
		2	Route 66			1	

Qualifier match 2	August 01	Atlanta Reign	3	–	0	Houston Outlaws	Online
	2:00 pm CDT	Details					
		2	Nepal			1	
		3	King's Row			2	
		2	Rialto			1	

Qualifier match 3	August 12	Florida Mayhem	1	–	3	Houston Outlaws	Online
	3:30 pm CDT	Details					
		0	Busan			2	
		3	Volskaya Industries			2	
		3	Blizzard World			3	
		2	Route 66			3	
		0	Ilios			2	

Qualifier match 4	August 14	Los Angeles Gladiators	3	–	0	Houston Outlaws	Online
	3:30 pm CDT	Details					
		2	Oasis			0	
		2	Hanamura			0	
		2	Numbani			1	

2021 season schedule

=== Postseason ===
2021 playoff game log
West Play-ins

Finals	September 5	Washington Justice	3	–	2	Houston Outlaws	Online
	3:30 pm CDT	Details					
		1	Oasis			2	
		2	Temple of Anubis			1	
		2	Eichenwalde			3	
		5	Dorado			4	
		2	Busan			1	
