= List of Paris Eternal players =

Paris Eternal is a French esports team founded in 2018 that competes in the Overwatch League (OWL). The Eternal began playing competitive Overwatch in the 2019 season.

All rostered players during the OWL season (including the playoffs) are included, even if they did not make an appearance.

== All-time roster ==
As of 16 December 2021

Handle	Name	Role	Country	Seasons	Ref.
BenBest	Benjamin Dieulafait	Tank	France	2019–2020	
Daan	Daniël Scheltema	Tank	Netherlands	2021–present	
Danye	Karol Szcześniak	Damage	Poland	2019	
dridro	Arthur Szanto	Support	France	2021–present	
ELLIVOTE	Elliot Vaneryd	Tank	Sweden	2021	
FDGod	Brice Monsçavoir	Support	France	2020	
Fielder	Kwon Joon	Support	South Korea	2020	
Finnsi	Finnbjörn Jónasson	Tank	Iceland	2019	
Glister	Gilsong Lim	Damage	South Korea	2022–present	
Greyy	Luís Perestrelo	Support	Portugal	2019–2020	
Hanbin	Choi Han-been	Tank	South Korea	2020	
HyP	Damien Souville	Support	France	2019–2020	
Kaan	Emir Kaan Okumus	Support	Germany	2021–present	
Kruise	Harrison Pond	Support	United Kingdom	2019–2020	
LhCloudy	Roni Tiihonen	Tank	Finland	2019	
Naga	Nikolai Dereli	Damage	Denmark	2021–present	
neptuNo	Alberto González Molinillo	Support	Spain	2021	
NiCOgdh	Nicolas Moret	Damage	France	2019–2020	
NoSmite	Jeong Da-un	Tank	South Korea	2020	
Onigod	Stefan Fiskerstrand	Damage	Norway	2021	
ShaDowBurn	George Gushcha	Damage	Russia	2019	
Smex	Eoghan O'Neill	Tank	United Kingdom	2020	
SoOn	Terence Tarlier	Damage	France	2019–2020	
Sp9rk1e	Kim Yeong-han	Damage	South Korea	2020	
Tsuna	Samir Ikram	Damage	France	2021	
Vestola	Ilari Vestola	Tank	Finland	2021, 2021–present	
Xzi	Jung Ki-hyo	Damage	South Korea	2020	
