= 2021 San Francisco Shock season =

- Head coach: Park "Crusty" Dae-hee
- Owner: Andy Miller
- Region: West

Results
- Record: 12–4 (.750)
- Place: West: 4th; League: 6th
- May Melee: Regional semifinals
- June Joust: Regional finals
- Summer Showdown: Did not qualify
- Countdown Cup: Regional finals
- Season Playoffs: Lower round 3
- Total Earnings: $250,000

The 2021 San Francisco Shock season was the fourth season of the San Francisco Shock's existence in the Overwatch League and their third under head coach Park "Crusty" Dae-hee. The team entered the season as the defending back-to-back Overwatch League champions after winning the 2019 and 2020 Grand Finals.

== Preceding offseason ==
=== Roster changes ===
Free agents
Position	Handle	Name	2021 team	Date signed	Notes
Support	Moth	Grant Espe	Los Angeles Gladiators	November 12	–
Damage	Rascal	Kim Dong-jun	Philadelphia Fusion	March 15	–
Tank	Super	Matthew DeLisi	San Francisco Shock	November 27	–
Support	Viol2t	Park Min-ki	San Francisco Shock	November 25	–
Legend Light green background indicates a player was re-signed by the Shock. Light red background indicates a player departed from the Shock.

The Shock entered free agency with four free agents.

==== Acquisitions ====
The Shock's first offseason acquisition was Brice "FDGod" Monsçavoir, a support player widely regarded as one of the best Western main support players, who was acquired from the Paris Eternal on November 12, 2020. The team's next acquisition was Charlie "Nero" Zwarg, a damage player coming off a season with the Guangzhou Charge in which he did not see much playing time due to visa issues amidst the COVID-19 pandemic, who was signed on November 30. The next day, they signed Lim "Glister" Gil-seong, a damage hitscan specialist coming off his rookie season with the London Spitfire.

=== Releases ===
Two of the Shock's four free agents did not return, both of which signed with other teams, beginning with support player Grant "Moth" Espe, who signed with the Los Angeles Gladiators on November 12, 2020. On March 15, 2021, damage player Kim "Rascal" Dong-jun signed with the Philadelphia Fusion. Outside of free agency, damage player Lee "ANS" Seon-chang announced his retirement on January 8, 2021, after one season with the team.

== Regular season ==
=== May Melee ===
The Shock began their 2021 season on April 16, playing against the Los Angeles Gladiators in the May Melee qualifiers. Despite losing the first map of the match, they won their season opener against the Gladiators 3–1. They lost their next game against the defending Houston Outlaws in a six-map series, thanks in part to a game-winning Reinhardt Earthshatter by the Outlaws' Myung-heum "Jjanggu" Cho to close out the series.

== Final roster ==
2021 San Francisco Shock roster
Players
Coaches

Role	No.	Handle	Name	Nationality
Damage	26	Glister	Lim Gil-seong	South Korea
Damage	47	ta1yo	Henderson, Sean Taiyo	Japan
Damage	42	nero	Zwarg, Charlie	United States
Damage	10	ANS	Lee Seon-chang	South Korea
Tank	1	super (C)	DeLisi, Matthew	United States
Tank	5	smurf	Yoo Myeong-hwan	South Korea
Tank	11	ChoiHyoBin	Choi Hyo-bin	South Korea
Support	27	FDGod	Monsçavoir, Brice	France
Support	17	Viol2t	Park Min-ki	South Korea
Support	13	Twilight	Lee Joo-seok	South Korea

Head coach

- Park "Crusty" Dae-hee

Legend:
- (I) Inactive
- (S) Suspended
- (2W) Two-way player
- Substitute
- (injured) Injury / Illness

Latest roster transaction: June 23, 2021.

=== Transactions ===
Transactions of/for players on the roster during the 2021 regular season:

- On June 23, damage player Kwon "Striker" Nam-joo retired.
- On June 23, the Shock signed damage player Lee "ANS" Seon-chang.

== Standings ==
Pos	Team	Pld	W	L	Pts	PCT	MW	ML	MT	MD	Qualification
1	Dallas Fuel	16	11	5	17	0.688	40	26	3	+14	Advance to season playoffs
2	Los Angeles Gladiators	16	11	5	14	0.688	41	21	0	+20	Advance to season playoffs
3	Atlanta Reign	16	11	5	13	0.688	41	21	0	+20	Advance to season playoffs
4	San Francisco Shock	16	12	4	12	0.750	43	24	2	+19	Advance to play-ins
5	Houston Outlaws	16	11	5	11	0.688	34	24	3	+10	Advance to play-ins
6	Washington Justice	16	9	7	9	0.563	29	26	2	+3	Advance to play-ins
7	Toronto Defiant	16	9	7	9	0.563	31	31	0	0	Advance to play-ins
8	Paris Eternal	16	8	8	8	0.500	32	32	2	0	Advance to play-ins
9	Boston Uprising	16	7	9	7	0.438	27	31	1	−4	Advance to play-ins
10	Florida Mayhem	16	5	11	6	0.313	26	38	2	−12	
11	London Spitfire	16	1	15	1	0.063	12	47	1	−35	
12	Vancouver Titans	16	1	15	1	0.063	10	45	0	−35	

Source: The Overwatch League
Rules for classification: 1) points; 2) winning percentage (including tournaments); 3) regular season wins; 4) regular season map differential

== Game log ==
=== Regular season ===
2021 game log
May Melee

Qualifier match 1	April 16	Los Angeles Gladiators	1	–	3	San Francisco Shock	Online
	1:30 pm PDT	Details					
		2	Ilios			1	
		3	Eichenwalde			4	
		1	Watchpoint: Gibraltar			3	
		1	Hanamura			2	

Qualifier match 2	April 18	Houston Outlaws	3	–	2	San Francisco Shock	Online
	12:00 noon PDT	Details					
		2	Lijiang Tower			0	
		3	Blizzard World			3	
		1	Dorado			0	
		3	Temple of Anubis			4	
		0	Oasis			2	
		1	Havana			0	

Qualifier match 3	April 30	San Francisco Shock	3	–	0	Florida Mayhem	Online
	1:30 pm PDT	Details					
		2	Busan			0	
		2	Hanamura			1	
		3	Eichenwalde			2	

Qualifier match 4	May 01	San Francisco Shock	3	–	2	Atlanta Reign	Online
	3:00 pm PDT	Details					
		0	Oasis			2	
		3	Volskaya Industries			2	
		2	King's Row			3	
		3	Havana			0	
		2	Nepal			0	

Regional semifinals	May 02	Dallas Fuel	3	–	0	San Francisco Shock	Online
	1:30 pm PDT	Details					
		2	Busan			0	
		2	Volskaya Industries			1	
		3	Eichenwalde			1	

June Joust

Qualifier match 1	May 29	San Francisco Shock	3	–	1	Toronto Defiant	Online
	1:30 pm PDT	Details					
		2	Oasis			0	
		1	Junkertown			2	
		2	Hanamura			1	
		3	Hollywood			1	

Qualifier match 2	May 30	Dallas Fuel	1	–	3	San Francisco Shock	Online
	3:00 pm PDT	Details					
		1	Busan			2	
		1	Dorado			2	
		3	Temple of Anubis			3	
		3	Eichenwalde			1	
		1	Ilios			2	

Qualifier match 3	June 04	San Francisco Shock	3	–	0	Vancouver Titans	Online
	1:30 pm PDT	Details					
		2	Lijiang Tower			0	
		1	Hanamura			0	
		3	Hollywood			0	

Qualifier match 4	June 05	San Francisco Shock	3	–	2	Washington Justice	Online
	3:00 pm PDT	Details					
		0	Nepal			2	
		2	Volskaya Industries			1	
		3	Numbani			4	
		3	Rialto			1	
		2	Busan			1	

Regional finals	June 06	Atlanta Reign	3	–	0	San Francisco Shock	Online
	4:15 pm PDT	Details					
		2	Nepal			0	
		2	Hanamura			1	
		4	Hollywood			3	

Summer Showdown

Qualifier match 1	June 25	Los Angeles Gladiators	3	–	2	San Francisco Shock	Online
	1:30 pm PDT	Details					
		2	Ilios			0	
		3	King's Row			4	
		1	Junkertown			2	
		2	Volskaya Industries			1	
		2	Lijiang Tower			0	

Qualifier match 2	June 26	London Spitfire	2	–	3	San Francisco Shock	Online
	12:00 noon PDT	Details					
		2	Oasis			1	
		1	Eichenwalde			3	
		2	Route 66			1	
		1	Temple of Anubis			2	
		1	Nepal			2	

Qualifier match 3	July 02	Paris Eternal	1	–	3	San Francisco Shock	Online
	12:00 noon PDT	Details					
		1	Nepal			2	
		2	Watchpoint: Gibraltar			3	
		4	Hanamura			3	
		3	Hollywood			4	

Qualifier match 4	July 03	Houston Outlaws	3	–	1	San Francisco Shock	Online
	3:00 pm PDT	Details					
		1	Busan			2	
		6	Junkertown			5	
		1	Volskaya Industries			0	
		2	King's Row			1	

Countdown Cup

Qualifier match 1	July 31	Dallas Fuel	3	–	2	San Francisco Shock	Online
	3:00 pm PDT	Details					
		2	Ilios			1	
		2	Numbani			3	
		4	Rialto			3	
		1	Hanamura			2	
		2	Lijiang Tower			1	

Qualifier match 2	August 01	San Francisco Shock	3	–	1	Boston Uprising	Online
	1:30 pm PDT	Details					
		2	Lijiang Tower			1	
		2	Blizzard World			1	
		1	Route 66			2	
		2	Temple of Anubis			1	

Qualifier match 3	August 13	San Francisco Shock	3	–	0	Vancouver Titans	Online
	1:30 pm PDT	Details					
		2	Oasis			0	
		2	Volskaya Industries			1	
		3	King's Row			0	

Qualifier match 4	August 14	San Francisco Shock	3	–	1	Toronto Defiant	Online
	3:00 pm PDT	Details					
		1	Busan			2	
		2	Hanamura			1	
		2	Numbani			0	

Regional semifinals	August 15	Dallas Fuel	0	–	3	San Francisco Shock	Online
	1:45 pm PDT	Details					
		0	Oasis			2	
		3	Temple of Anubis			4	
		1	Blizzard World			3	

Regional finals	August 15	San Francisco Shock	2	–	3	Los Angeles Gladiators	Online
	5:15 pm PDT	Details					
		0	Ilios			2	
		2	Hanamura			1	
		3	Blizzard World			2	
		2	Havana			3	
		1	Oasis			2	

2021 season schedule

=== Postseason ===
2021 playoff game log
West Play-ins

Finals	September 5	Toronto Defiant	0	–	3	San Francisco Shock	Online
	12:00 noon PDT	Details					
		0	Oasis			2	
		1	Volskaya Industries			2	
		0	Numbani			3	

Season Playoffs

Upper round 1	September 21	San Francisco Shock	0	–	3	Shanghai Dragons	Online
	7:00 pm PDT	Details					
		1	Ilios			2	
		0	Hanamura			1	
		2	King's Row			3	

Lower round 1	September 22	Philadelphia Fusion	2	–	3	San Francisco Shock	Online
	5:30 pm PDT	Details					
		1	Nepal			2	
		3	Volskaya Industries			2	
		3	King's Row			4	
		3	Route 66			2	
		0	Ilios			2	

Lower round 2	September 23	San Francisco Shock	3	–	2	Chengdu Hunters	Online
	6:00 pm PDT	Details					
		2	Lijiang Tower			0	
		3	Temple of Anubis			3	
		4	King's Row			3	
		2	Dorado			3	
		0	Ilios			2	
		2	Havana			0	

Lower round 3	September 24	San Francisco Shock	1	–	3	Atlanta Reign	Online
	6:00 pm PDT	Details					
		2	Nepal			0	
		2	Hanamura			3	
		1	King's Row			3	
		2	Havana			3	
