= 2021 Washington Justice season =

- Head coach: Han "Sup7eme" Seung-jun
- Owner: Mark Ein
- Region: West

Results
- Record: 9–7 (.563)
- Place: West: 6th; League: 10th
- May Melee: Regional finals
- June Joust: Did not qualify
- Summer Showdown: Regional finals
- Countdown Cup: Did not qualify
- Season Playoffs: Lower round 1
- Total Earnings: $50,000

The 2021 Washington Justice season was the third season of Washington Justice's existence in the Overwatch League and the team's first full season under head coach Han "Sup7eme" Seung-jun, after he took over the position midway through their 2020 season.

== Preceding offseason ==
=== Roster changes ===
Free agents
| Position | Handle | Name | 2021 team | Date signed | Notes |
|---|---|---|---|---|---|
| Support | Aimgod | Kwon Min-seok | – | – | Option declined |
| Support | Ark | Hong Yeon-jun | – | – | Option declined |
| Damage | Decay | Jang Gui-un | Washington Justice | October 24 | – |
| Tank | Jjanu | Choi Hyun-woo | – | – | Option declined |
| Damage | Stitch | Lee Chung-hee | – | – | Option declined |
Legend Light green background indicates a player was re-signed by the Justice. Light red background indicates a player departed from the Justice.

The Justice entered free agency with five free agents, all of which became free agents due to the Justice not exercising the option to retain the player for another year.

==== Acquisitions ====
The Justice's first offseason acquisition was Kim "Mag" Tae-sung, a rookie tank player coming from Overwatch Contenders Korea team RunAway, on October 24, 2020. Next, they signed Min "Jerry" Tae-hee, a hitscan damage player coming off a season with the Boston Uprising in which he had "bright moments throughout," who signed on November 9. Ten days later, the Justice signed Yoon "Bebe" Hee-chang, a support player who is an "expert Zenyatta and reliable Ana player." The following day, the team signed veteran Jung "Closer" Won-sik, a "very capable" support player who played with the Dallas Fuel in 2020. The next day, November 21, Washington signed Kim "Fury" Jun-ho, a veteran support player coming off of a top-four finish with the Philadelphia Fusion last season. The Justice's final acquisition in November came the following day with the signing of Park "Ria" Sung-wook, a tank player coming off an "impressive playoffs performance" with the Hangzhou Spark. The team's final offseason signing came in February; on February 14, 2021, they signed Kim "Assassin" Sung-won, a rookie damage player coming off of a third-place finish at Overwatch Contenders' The Gauntlet: Asia with team RunAway.

==== Departures ====
Four of the Justice's five free agents did not return. Damage player Lee "Stitch" Chung-hee, tank player Choi "Jjanu" Hyun-woo, and support player Kwon "Aimgod" Min-seok did not sign with a team in the offseason, while support player Hong "Ark" Yeon-jun announced his retirement in the offseason. Outside of their free agents, the Justice released tank player Gye "Roar" Chang-hoon on October 22, 2020.

== Final roster ==
2021 Washington Justice roster
Players
Coaches

| Role | No. | Handle | Name | Nationality |
|---|---|---|---|---|
| Damage | 1 | Jerry | Min Tae-hee | South Korea |
| Damage | 17 | Decay | Jang Gui-un | South Korea |
| Damage | 21 | TTuba | Lee Ho-sung | South Korea |
| Damage | 61 | Assassin | Kim Sung-won | South Korea |
| Tank | 1 | Mag | Kim Tae-sung | South Korea |
| Tank | 19 | Fury | Kim Jun-ho | South Korea |
| Support | 2 | Closer | Jung Won-sik | South Korea |
| Support | 23 | BeBe | Yoon Hui-chang | South Korea |

Head coach

- Han "Sup7eme" Seung-jun

Legend:
- (I) Inactive
- (S) Suspended
- (2W) Two-way player
- Substitute
- (injured) Injury / Illness

Latest roster transaction: May 12, 2021.

=== Transactions ===
Transactions of/for players on the roster during the 2021 regular season:

- On May 12, tank player Park "Ria" Seong-wook retired.

== Standings ==
| Pos | Team | Pld | W | L | Pts | PCT | MW | ML | MT | MD | Qualification |
|---|---|---|---|---|---|---|---|---|---|---|---|
| 1 | Dallas Fuel | 16 | 11 | 5 | 17 | 0.688 | 40 | 26 | 3 | +14 | Advance to season playoffs |
| 2 | Los Angeles Gladiators | 16 | 11 | 5 | 14 | 0.688 | 41 | 21 | 0 | +20 | Advance to season playoffs |
| 3 | Atlanta Reign | 16 | 11 | 5 | 13 | 0.688 | 41 | 21 | 0 | +20 | Advance to season playoffs |
| 4 | San Francisco Shock | 16 | 12 | 4 | 12 | 0.750 | 43 | 24 | 2 | +19 | Advance to play-ins |
| 5 | Houston Outlaws | 16 | 11 | 5 | 11 | 0.688 | 34 | 24 | 3 | +10 | Advance to play-ins |
| 6 | Washington Justice | 16 | 9 | 7 | 9 | 0.563 | 29 | 26 | 2 | +3 | Advance to play-ins |
| 7 | Toronto Defiant | 16 | 9 | 7 | 9 | 0.563 | 31 | 31 | 0 | 0 | Advance to play-ins |
| 8 | Paris Eternal | 16 | 8 | 8 | 8 | 0.500 | 32 | 32 | 2 | 0 | Advance to play-ins |
| 9 | Boston Uprising | 16 | 7 | 9 | 7 | 0.438 | 27 | 31 | 1 | −4 | Advance to play-ins |
| 10 | Florida Mayhem | 16 | 5 | 11 | 6 | 0.313 | 26 | 38 | 2 | −12 | |
| 11 | London Spitfire | 16 | 1 | 15 | 1 | 0.063 | 12 | 47 | 1 | −35 | |
| 12 | Vancouver Titans | 16 | 1 | 15 | 1 | 0.063 | 10 | 45 | 0 | −35 | |

Source: The Overwatch League
Rules for classification: 1) points; 2) winning percentage (including tournaments); 3) regular season wins; 4) regular season map differential

== Game log ==
=== Regular season ===
2021 game log
May Melee

| Qualifier match 1 | April 24 | Washington Justice | 3 | – | 1 | Dallas Fuel | Online |
| | 6:00 pm EDT | Details | | | | | |
| | | 2 | Ilios | | | 0 | |
| | | 4 | Watchpoint: Gibraltar | | | 5 | |
| | | 2 | Hanamura | | | 1 | |
| | | 4 | Eichenwalde | | | 3 | |

| Qualifier match 2 | April 25 | Vancouver Titans | 1 | – | 3 | Washington Justice | Online |
| | 6:00 pm EDT | Details | | | | | |
| | | 0 | Lijiang Tower | | | 2 | |
| | | 1 | Dorado | | | 3 | |
| | | 3 | Temple of Anubis | | | 2 | |
| | | 0 | Blizzard World | | | 1 | |

| Qualifier match 3 | April 29 | Washington Justice | 3 | – | 1 | Boston Uprising | Online |
| | 4:30 pm EDT | Details | | | | | |
| | | 2 | Busan | | | 1 | |
| | | 3 | Volskaya Industries | | | 2 | |
| | | 1 | King's Row | | | 2 | |
| | | 3 | Havana | | | 2 | |

| Qualifier match 4 | April 30 | Toronto Defiant | 0 | – | 3 | Washington Justice | Online |
| | 6:00 pm EDT | Details | | | | | |
| | | 0 | Oasis | | | 2 | |
| | | 0 | Temple of Anubis | | | 2 | |
| | | 0 | Blizzard World | | | 1 | |

| Regional finals | May 02 | Florida Mayhem | 3 | – | 1 | Washington Justice | Online |
| | 6:30 pm EDT | Details | | | | | |
| | | 2 | Oasis | | | 1 | |
| | | 1 | Volskaya Industries | | | 2 | |
| | | 1 | King's Row | | | 0 | |
| | | 1 | Dorado | | | 0 | |

June Joust

| Qualifier match 1 | May 22 | Paris Eternal | 3 | – | 0 | Washington Justice | Online |
| | 3:00 pm EDT | Details | | | | | |
| | | 2 | Ilios | | | 1 | |
| | | 3 | Numbani | | | 3 | |
| | | 3 | Rialto | | | 0 | |
| | | 2 | Volskaya Industries | | | 2 | |
| | | 2 | Lijiang Tower | | | 0 | |

| Qualifier match 2 | May 23 | Washington Justice | 0 | – | 3 | Boston Uprising | Online |
| | 4:30 pm EDT | Details | | | | | |
| | | 0 | Lijiang Tower | | | 2 | |
| | | 1 | Hollywood | | | 2 | |
| | | 0 | Junkertown | | | 1 | |

| Qualifier match 3 | June 04 | Florida Mayhem | 0 | – | 3 | Washington Justice | Online |
| | 6:00 pm EDT | Details | | | | | |
| | | 0 | Oasis | | | 2 | |
| | | 1 | Temple of Anubis | | | 2 | |
| | | 1 | Eichenwalde | | | 3 | |

| Qualifier match 4 | June 05 | San Francisco Shock | 3 | – | 2 | Washington Justice | Online |
| | 6:00 pm EDT | Details | | | | | |
| | | 0 | Nepal | | | 2 | |
| | | 2 | Volskaya Industries | | | 1 | |
| | | 3 | Numbani | | | 4 | |
| | | 3 | Rialto | | | 1 | |
| | | 2 | Busan | | | 1 | |

Summer Showdown

| Qualifier match 1 | July 02 | Washington Justice | 0 | – | 3 | Atlanta Reign | Online |
| | 4:30 pm EDT | Details | | | | | |
| | | 1 | Busan | | | 2 | |
| | | 0 | Junkertown | | | 1 | |
| | | 2 | Volskaya Industries | | | 3 | |

| Qualifier match 2 | July 04 | Washington Justice | 3 | – | 0 | Florida Mayhem | Online |
| | 6:00 pm EDT | Details | | | | | |
| | | 2 | Oasis | | | 0 | |
| | | 3 | Route 66 | | | 2 | |
| | | 2 | Temple of Anubis | | | 1 | |

| Qualifier match 3 | July 09 | Washington Justice | 3 | – | 0 | London Spitfire | Online |
| | 3:00 pm EDT | Details | | | | | |
| | | 2 | Lijiang Tower | | | 0 | |
| | | 1 | Temple of Anubis | | | 0 | |
| | | 3 | Eichenwalde | | | 2 | |

| Qualifier match 4 | July 10 | Washington Justice | 3 | – | 2 | Los Angeles Gladiators | Online |
| | 6:00 pm EDT | Details | | | | | |
| | | 2 | Nepal | | | 1 | |
| | | 2 | Hanamura | | | 1 | |
| | | 3 | Hollywood | | | 4 | |
| | | 1 | Watchpoint: Gibraltar | | | 2 | |
| | | 2 | Busan | | | 1 | |

| Regional semifinals | July 11 | Paris Eternal | 2 | – | 3 | Washington Justice | Online |
| | 3:00 pm EDT | Details | | | | | |
| | | 2 | Oasis | | | 0 | |
| | | 0 | Hanamura | | | 1 | |
| | | 1 | Hollywood | | | 0 | |
| | | 0 | Route 66 | | | 1 | |
| | | 0 | Busan | | | 2 | |

| Regional finals | July 11 | Washington Justice | 2 | – | 3 | Dallas Fuel | Online |
| | 6:00 pm EDT | Details | | | | | |
| | | 2 | Lijiang Tower | | | 1 | |
| | | 1 | Volskaya Industries | | | 2 | |
| | | 1 | King's Row | | | 3 | |
| | | 2 | Route 66 | | | 1 | |
| | | 0 | Nepal | | | 2 | |

Countdown Cup

| Qualifier match 1 | July 30 | Houston Outlaws | 3 | – | 0 | Washington Justice | Online |
| | 4:30 pm EDT | Details | | | | | |
| | | 2 | Ilios | | | 0 | |
| | | 3 | Blizzard World | | | 2 | |
| | | 2 | Route 66 | | | 1 | |

| Qualifier match 2 | August 01 | Los Angeles Gladiators | 3 | – | 0 | Washington Justice | Online |
| | 6:00 pm EDT | Details | | | | | |
| | | 2 | Busan | | | 1 | |
| | | 3 | Numbani | | | 2 | |
| | | 2 | Rialto | | | 1 | |

| Qualifier match 3 | August 07 | Toronto Defiant | 3 | – | 0 | Washington Justice | Online |
| | 6:00 pm EDT | Details | | | | | |
| | | 2 | Lijiang Tower | | | 0 | |
| | | 2 | Havana | | | 1 | |
| | | 2 | Hanamura | | | 1 | |

| Qualifier match 4 | August 08 | Vancouver Titans | 0 | – | 3 | Washington Justice | Online |
| | 6:00 pm EDT | Details | | | | | |
| | | 0 | Nepal | | | 2 | |
| | | 2 | Route 66 | | | 3 | |
| | | 2 | Temple of Anubis | | | 3 | |

2021 season schedule

=== Postseason ===
2021 playoff game log
West Play-ins

| Semifinals | September 4 | Paris Eternal | 0 | – | 3 | Washington Justice | Online |
| | 3:00 pm EDT | Details | | | | | |
| | | 0 | Lijiang Tower | | | 2 | |
| | | 1 | Temple of Anubis | | | 2 | |
| | | 3 | Numbani | | | 4 | |

| Finals | September 5 | Washington Justice | 3 | – | 2 | Houston Outlaws | Online |
| | 4:30 pm EDT | Details | | | | | |
| | | 1 | Oasis | | | 2 | |
| | | 2 | Temple of Anubis | | | 1 | |
| | | 2 | Eichenwalde | | | 3 | |
| | | 5 | Dorado | | | 4 | |
| | | 2 | Busan | | | 1 | |

Season Playoffs

| Upper round 1 | September 21 | Washington Justice | 1 | – | 3 | Dallas Fuel | Online |
| | 7:00 pm EDT | Details | | | | | |
| | | 2 | Lijiang Tower | | | 1 | |
| | | 1 | Volskaya Industries | | | 2 | |
| | | 2 | King's Row | | | 3 | |
| | | 3 | Havana | | | 4 | |

| Lower round 1 | September 22 | Washington Justice | 0 | – | 3 | Atlanta Reign | Online |
| | 7:00 pm EDT | Details | | | | | |
| | | 0 | Nepal | | | 2 | |
| | | 0 | Temple of Anubis | | | 2 | |
| | | 1 | King's Row | | | 3 | |
