= 2021 Paris Eternal season =

- Head coach: Zouheir "GetAmazed" Baba
- General manager: Kim "AVALLA" Kyoung-ey
- Owner: Drew McCourt
- Region: West

Results
- Record: 8–8 (.500)
- Place: West: 8th; League: 12th
- May Melee: Did not qualify
- June Joust: Did not qualify
- Summer Showdown: Regional semifinals
- Countdown Cup: Regional semifinals
- Season Playoffs: Did not qualify
- Total Earnings: $0

The 2021 Paris Eternal season will be the third season of Paris Eternal's existence in the Overwatch League and their first under head coach Zouheir "GetAmazed" Baba.

== Preceding offseason ==
=== Roster changes ===
The Eternal entered free agency with six free agents, five of which became free agents due to the Eternal not exercising the option to retain the player for another year.

==== Acquisitions ====
The Eternal announced the signing of six players on 9 December 2020. Amongst the signings were damage players Nikolai "Naga" Dereli, a rookie coming from Overwatch Contenders team Obey Alliance, and Stefan "Onigod" Fiskerstrand, who spent four months with the Dallas Fuel in the previous season. The tank players signed were Daniel "Daan" Scheltema, a rookie main tank player with Overwatch Contenders team Revival, and Elliot "ELLIVOTE" Vaneryd, an off-tank player who had been in the league previously and most recently competed with Contenders team New Kings. The support players signed were Alberto "neptuNo" Gonzalez, a veteran player in the league coming from the Guangzhou Charge, and Emir "Kaan" Okumus, a rookie coming from Contenders team Obey Alliance. The team's only other acquisition of the offseason was Samir "Tsuna" Ikram, a damage player who had played for the Vancouver Titans for five months in the 2020 season, who was signed on 18 December.

==== Departures ====
None of the Eternal's six free agents returned, five of which signed with other teams, beginning with support player Kwon "Fielder" Jun signing with the Dallas Fuel on 27 October 2020. In December, two more players were signed to new teams: tank player Benjamin "Benbest" Dieulafait was signed to Overwatch Contenders team Young and Beautiful on 10 December, and damage player Terence "Soon" Tarlier was signed to the Boston Uprising on 16 December. Two more players signed to new teams on 10 March: damage player Nicolas "NicoGDH" Moret signed with Overwatch Contenders team Young and Beautiful, and Eoghan "Smex" O'Neill signed with Contenders team Ex Oblivione. The Eternal's final free agent, tank player Jeong "Nosmite" Da-un did not sign with a team in the offseason.

Outside of free agency, the Eternal transferred several players to new teams, beginning with damage players Kim "SP9RK1E" Young-han and Choi "Hanbin" Han-been transferring to the Dallas Fuel on 23 October. They then transferred support player Brice "FDGod" Monsçavoir to the San Francisco Shock on 12 November. The final transfer of the season was damage player Jung "Xzi" Ki-hyo also transferring to the Fuel on 14 November.

== Final roster ==
2021 Paris Eternal roster
Players
Coaches

Role	No.	Handle	Name	Nationality
Damage	3	Onigod	Fiskerstrand, Stefan	Norway
Damage	10	Tsuna	Ikram, Samir	France
Damage	16	Naga	Dereli, Nikolai	Denmark
Tank	7	Daan	Scheltema, Daniël	Netherlands
Tank	6	Vestola	Vestola, Ilari	Finland
Support	11	dridro	Szanto, Arthur	France
Support	1	Kaan	Kaan Okumus, Emir	Germany

Head coach

- Zouheir "GetAmazed" Baba

Legend:
- (I) Inactive
- (S) Suspended
- (2W) Two-way player
- Substitute
- (injured) Injury / Illness

Latest roster transaction: 2 June 2021.

=== Transactions ===
Transactions of/for players on the roster during the 2021 regular season:

- On 6 May, the Eternal released support Alberto "neptuNo" González.
- On 10 May, the Eternal signed support Arthur "Dridro" Szanto.
- On 2 June, tank Elliot "ELLIVOTE" Vaneryd retired.
- On 2 June, the Eternal signed tank Ilari "Vestola" Vestola.

== Standings ==
Pos	Team	Pld	W	L	Pts	PCT	MW	ML	MT	MD	Qualification
1	Dallas Fuel	16	11	5	17	0.688	40	26	3	+14	Advance to season playoffs
2	Los Angeles Gladiators	16	11	5	14	0.688	41	21	0	+20	Advance to season playoffs
3	Atlanta Reign	16	11	5	13	0.688	41	21	0	+20	Advance to season playoffs
4	San Francisco Shock	16	12	4	12	0.750	43	24	2	+19	Advance to play-ins
5	Houston Outlaws	16	11	5	11	0.688	34	24	3	+10	Advance to play-ins
6	Washington Justice	16	9	7	9	0.563	29	26	2	+3	Advance to play-ins
7	Toronto Defiant	16	9	7	9	0.563	31	31	0	0	Advance to play-ins
8	Paris Eternal	16	8	8	8	0.500	32	32	2	0	Advance to play-ins
9	Boston Uprising	16	7	9	7	0.438	27	31	1	−4	Advance to play-ins
10	Florida Mayhem	16	5	11	6	0.313	26	38	2	−12	
11	London Spitfire	16	1	15	1	0.063	12	47	1	−35	
12	Vancouver Titans	16	1	15	1	0.063	10	45	0	−35	

Source: The Overwatch League
Rules for classification: 1) points; 2) winning percentage (including tournaments); 3) regular season wins; 4) regular season map differential

== Game log ==
=== Regular season ===
2021 game log
May Melee

Qualifier match 1	23 April	Paris Eternal	3	–	1	Vancouver Titans	Online
	9:00 pm CET	Details					
		0	Oasis			2	
		2	Watchpoint: Gibraltar			1	
		6	Hanamura			5	
		3	Eichenwalde			2	

Qualifier match 2	24 April	Houston Outlaws	3	–	1	Paris Eternal	Online
	9:00 pm CET	Details					
		2	Nepal			0	
		4	Havana			5	
		3	Volskaya Industries			2	
		4	King's Row			3	

Qualifier match 3	29 April	Paris Eternal	0	–	3	Atlanta Reign	Online
	9:00 pm CET	Details					
		1	Busan			2	
		2	Hanamura			3	
		2	Eichenwalde			3	

Qualifier match 4	1 May	Florida Mayhem	3	–	1	Paris Eternal	Online
	9:00 pm CET	Details					
		2	Lijiang Tower			0	
		0	Temple of Anubis			1	
		2	Blizzard World			1	
		2	Dorado			1	

June Joust

Qualifier match 1	21 May	Paris Eternal	1	–	3	Toronto Defiant	Online
	9:00 pm CET	Details					
		0	Busan			2	
		3	Eichenwalde			1	
		2	Dorado			3	
		1	Temple of Anubis			2	

Qualifier match 2	22 May	Paris Eternal	3	–	0	Washington Justice	Online
	9:00 pm CET	Details					
		2	Ilios			1	
		3	Numbani			3	
		3	Rialto			0	
		2	Volskaya Industries			2	
		2	Lijiang Tower			0	

Qualifier match 3	3 June	Boston Uprising	2	–	3	Paris Eternal	Online
	9:00 pm CET	Details					
		2	Nepal			1	
		1	Volskaya Industries			2	
		1	Numbani			0	
		1	Rialto			3	
		1	Busan			2	

Qualifier match 4	5 June	Paris Eternal	1	–	3	Los Angeles Gladiators	Online
	9:00 pm CET	Details					
		0	Lijiang Tower			2	
		3	Hanamura			2	
		0	Hollywood			3	
		2	Junkertown			3	

Summer Showdown

Qualifier match 1	25 June	London Spitfire	1	–	3	Paris Eternal	Online
	9:00 pm CET	Details					
		2	Busan			0	
		0	Hollywood			1	
		1	Watchpoint: Gibraltar			3	
		1	Hanamura			2	

Qualifier match 2	27 June	Los Angeles Gladiators	2	–	3	Paris Eternal	Online
	9:00 pm CET	Details					
		2	Oasis			0	
		2	Eichenwalde			1	
		2	Route 66			3	
		1	Temple of Anubis			2	
		0	Nepal			2	

Qualifier match 3	2 July	Paris Eternal	1	–	3	San Francisco Shock	Online
	9:00 pm CET	Details					
		1	Nepal			2	
		2	Watchpoint: Gibraltar			3	
		4	Hanamura			3	
		3	Hollywood			4	

Qualifier match 4	3 July	Paris Eternal	3	–	0	Vancouver Titans	Online
	9:00 pm CET	Details					
		2	Lijiang Tower			0	
		3	Junkertown			0	
		2	Volskaya Industries			1	

Regional semifinals	11 July	Paris Eternal	2	–	3	Washington Justice	Online
	9:00 pm CET	Details					
		2	Oasis			0	
		0	Hanamura			1	
		1	Hollywood			0	
		0	Route 66			1	
		0	Busan			2	

Countdown Cup

Qualifier match 1	30 July	Dallas Fuel	2	–	3	Paris Eternal	Online
	9:00 pm CET	Details					
		1	Lijiang Tower			2	
		5	Blizzard World			4	
		0	Havana			3	
		2	Temple of Anubis			1	
		1	Oasis			2	

Qualifier match 2	31 July	Boston Uprising	3	–	1	Paris Eternal	Online
	9:00 pm CET	Details					
		2	Ilios			0	
		0	King's Row			3	
		2	Rialto			1	
		3	Volskaya Industries			2	

Qualifier match 3	12 August	Paris Eternal	2	–	3	Toronto Defiant	Online
	9:00 pm CET	Details					
		1	Oasis			2	
		2	Volskaya Industries			3	
		6	King's Row			5	
		3	Route 66			2	
		1	Nepal			2	

Qualifier match 4	13 August	London Spitfire	0	–	3	Paris Eternal	Online
	9:00 pm CET	Details					
		0	Busan			2	
		0	Hanamura			2	
		0	Numbani			2	

Regional semifinals	15 August	Paris Eternal	2	–	3	Toronto Defiant	Online
	9:00 pm CET	Details					
		2	Lijiang Tower			1	
		0	Volskaya Industries			1	
		1	Blizzard World			2	
		3	Rialto			2	
		1	Oasis			2	

2021 season schedule

=== Postseason ===
2021 playoff game log
West Play-ins

Semifinals	4 September	Paris Eternal	0	–	3	Washington Justice	Online
	9:00 pm CET	Details					
		0	Lijiang Tower			2	
		1	Temple of Anubis			2	
		3	Numbani			4	
