= 2021 Toronto Defiant season =

- Head coach: Kim "KDG" Dong-gun
- Owner: Chris Overholt
- Region: West

Results
- Record: 9–7 (.563)
- Place: West: 7th; League: 11th
- May Melee: Regional semifinals
- June Joust: Did not qualify
- Summer Showdown: Did not qualify
- Countdown Cup: Regional finals
- Season Playoffs: Did not qualify
- Total Earnings: $0

The 2021 Toronto Defiant season will be the third season of Toronto Defiant's existence in the Overwatch League and the team's first under head coach Kim "KDG" Dong-gun.

== Preceding offseason ==
=== Roster changes ===
Free agents
Position	Handle	Name	2021 team	Date signed	Notes
Damage	Agilities	Brady Girardi	Los Angeles Valiant	December 9	Option declined
Tank	Beast	Adam Denton	Toronto Defiant	November 6	Option declined
Support	Kariv	Bak Young-seo	Guangzhou Charge	November 10	Option declined
Support	Kruise	Harrison Pond	Young and Beautiful (OWC)	March 10	–
Damage	Logix	Andreas Berghmans	Toronto Defiant	October 23	–
Damage	Mangachu	Liam Campbell	–	–	–
Tank	Nevix	Andreas Karlsson	–	–	Option declined
Tank	Numlocked	Sebastian Barton	–	–	Option declined
Support	Roky	Park Joo-sung	–	–	–
Damage	Surefour	Lane Roberts	–	–	Option declined
Damage	Zykk	Thomas Hosono	–	–	Option declined
Legend Light green background indicates a player was re-signed by the Defiant. Light red background indicates a player departed from the Defiant.

The Defiant entered free agency with eleven free agents, seven of which became free agents due to the Defiant not exercising the option to retain the player for another year.

==== Acquisitions ====
The Defiant's first offseason acquisition was Park "Aztac" Jeong-su, a rookie support player coming off of an Overwatch Contenders Korea championship on team WSG Phoenix while on a loan from Uprising Academy, who was signed on November 17, 2020. Two days later, they signed An "Ansoonjae" Soon-jae, another rookie support player previously playing for Contenders team Element Mystic. On November 21, Toronto signed Kim "Sado" Su-min, a veteran tank player coming off of a season with the Philadelphia Fusion in which he was a top-five main tank player in the league. Two days later, the Defiant acquired damage player Jeong "Heesu" Hee-su from the Philadelphia Fusion. The following day, they signed Choi "Michelle" Min-hyuk, a "consistently impressive" veteran tank player coming off a 2020 Grand Finals season with the Seoul Dynasty. The Defiant made one acquisition in December; on December 11, they signed "Na1st" Lee Ho-sung, a rookie damage player specializing in projectile heroes coming from Contenders team T1. The team's final acquisition was Mun "Lastro" Jung-won, a support player who had recently been released from the Los Angeles Valiant, signing on February 10, 2021.

==== Departures ====
Nine of the Defiant's eleven free agents did not return, three of which signed with other teams, beginning with support player Bak "Kariv" Young-seo signing with the Guangzhou Charge on November 10, 2020. On December 9, damage player Brady "Agilities" Girardi signed with the Los Angeles Valiant. The team's final free agent to sign to another team was support player Harrison "Kruise" Pond, who signed with Overwatch Contenders team Young and Beautiful on March 10, 2021. Four of the Defiant's free agents announced their retirements in the offseason: damage player Lane "Surefour" Roberts, damage player Thomas "Zykk" Hosono, tank player Sebastian "Numlocked" Barton, and support player Park "Roky" Joo-sung. Damage player Liam "Mangachu" Campbell and tank player Andreas "Nevix" Karlsson did not sign with a team in the 2020 offseason.

== Regular season ==
The Defiant began their 2021 season on April 17, playing against Canadian rivals Vancouver Titans in the May Melee qualifiers. They won their opener 3–1. Despite starting their following match against the Atlanta Reign with a 0–2 deficit, Toronto defeated the Reign 3–2 to close the week undefeated.

On May 25, the Defiant announced that it had three positive COVID-19 cases within the organization, including damage player Andreas "Logix" Berghmans. Two days later, they signed Luka "Aspire" Rolovic, a damage player from Overwatch Contenders team American Tornado, on a 30-day contract.

== Final roster ==
2021 Toronto Defiant roster
Players
Coaches

Role	No.	Handle	Name	Nationality
Damage	22	Logix	Berghmans, Andreas	Belgium
Damage	12	Aspire	Rolovic, Luka	United States
Damage	10	Heesu	Jeong Hee-su	South Korea
Damage	18	Na1st	Lee Ho-sung	South Korea
Tank	9	SADO	Kim Su-min	South Korea
Tank	51	Michelle	Choi Min-hyuk	South Korea
Support	30	ANSOONJAE	An Soon-jae	South Korea
Support	77	Lastro	Mun Jung-won	South Korea
Support	10	Aztac	Park Jeong-su	South Korea

Head coach

- Kim "KDG" Dong-gun

Legend:
- (I) Inactive
- (S) Suspended
- (2W) Two-way player
- Substitute
- (injured) Injury / Illness

Latest roster transaction: June 21, 2021.

=== Transactions ===
Transactions of/for players on the roster during the 2020 regular season:

- On May 27, the Defiant signed damage player Luka "Aspire" Rolovic on a 30-day contract.
- On June 21, tank player Adam "Beast" Denton retired.

== Standings ==
Pos	Team	Pld	W	L	Pts	PCT	MW	ML	MT	MD	Qualification
1	Dallas Fuel	16	11	5	17	0.688	40	26	3	+14	Advance to season playoffs
2	Los Angeles Gladiators	16	11	5	14	0.688	41	21	0	+20	Advance to season playoffs
3	Atlanta Reign	16	11	5	13	0.688	41	21	0	+20	Advance to season playoffs
4	San Francisco Shock	16	12	4	12	0.750	43	24	2	+19	Advance to play-ins
5	Houston Outlaws	16	11	5	11	0.688	34	24	3	+10	Advance to play-ins
6	Washington Justice	16	9	7	9	0.563	29	26	2	+3	Advance to play-ins
7	Toronto Defiant	16	9	7	9	0.563	31	31	0	0	Advance to play-ins
8	Paris Eternal	16	8	8	8	0.500	32	32	2	0	Advance to play-ins
9	Boston Uprising	16	7	9	7	0.438	27	31	1	−4	Advance to play-ins
10	Florida Mayhem	16	5	11	6	0.313	26	38	2	−12	
11	London Spitfire	16	1	15	1	0.063	12	47	1	−35	
12	Vancouver Titans	16	1	15	1	0.063	10	45	0	−35	

Source: The Overwatch League
Rules for classification: 1) points; 2) winning percentage (including tournaments); 3) regular season wins; 4) regular season map differential

== Game log ==
=== Regular season ===
2021 game log
May Melee

Qualifier match 1	April 17	Toronto Defiant	3	–	1	Vancouver Titans	Online
	3:00 pm EDT	Details					
		2	Busan			1	
		3	Eichenwalde			2	
		1	Watchpoint: Gibraltar			2	
		2	Hanamura			1	

Qualifier match 2	April 18	Toronto Defiant	3	–	2	Atlanta Reign	Online
	6:00 pm EDT	Details					
		0	Nepal			2	
		2	Blizzard World			3	
		3	Dorado			2	
		2	Temple of Anubis			1	
		2	Busan			0	

Qualifier match 3	April 30	Toronto Defiant	0	–	3	Washington Justice	Online
	6:00 pm EDT	Details					
		0	Oasis			2	
		0	Temple of Anubis			2	
		0	Blizzard World			1	

Qualifier match 4	May 01	London Spitfire	1	–	3	Toronto Defiant	Online
	4:30 pm EDT	Details					
		1	Lijiang Tower			2	
		3	Volskaya Industries			2	
		1	King's Row			2	
		2	Havana			3	

Regional semifinals	May 02	Toronto Defiant	0	–	3	Florida Mayhem	Online
	3:00 pm EDT	Details					
		0	Ilios			2	
		1	Temple of Anubis			2	
		1	King's Row			2	

June Joust

Qualifier match 1	May 21	Paris Eternal	1	–	3	Toronto Defiant	Online
	3:00 pm EDT	Details					
		0	Busan			2	
		3	Eichenwalde			1	
		2	Dorado			3	
		1	Temple of Anubis			2	

Qualifier match 2	May 22	Toronto Defiant	0	–	3	Boston Uprising	Online
	6:00 pm EDT	Details					
		0	Ilios			2	
		2	Numbani			3	
		3	Rialto			4	

Qualifier match 3	May 29	San Francisco Shock	3	–	1	Toronto Defiant	Online
	4:30 pm EDT	Details					
		2	Oasis			0	
		1	Junkertown			2	
		2	Hanamura			1	
		3	Hollywood			1	

Qualifier match 4	May 30	Toronto Defiant	1	–	3	Houston Outlaws	Online
	3:00 pm EDT	Details					
		2	Lijiang Tower			1	
		0	Rialto			3	
		0	Volskaya Industries			2	
		0	Numbani			3	

Summer Showdown

Qualifier match 1	June 26	Florida Mayhem	2	–	3	Toronto Defiant	Online
	4:30 pm EDT	Details					
		1	Ilios			2	
		2	Hollywood			1	
		3	Watchpoint: Gibraltar			1	
		2	Hanamura			3	
		0	Lijiang Tower			2	

Qualifier match 2	June 27	Toronto Defiant	3	–	0	Vancouver Titans	Online
	6:00 pm EDT	Details					
		2	Oasis			1	
		3	Eichenwalde			0	
		2	Route 66			0	

Qualifier match 3	July 09	Los Angeles Gladiators	3	–	0	Toronto Defiant	Online
	4:30 pm EDT	Details					
		2	Lijiang Tower			1	
		5	Temple of Anubis			4	
		1	Eichenwalde			0	

Qualifier match 4	July 10	Toronto Defiant	1	–	3	Dallas Fuel	Online
	4:30 pm EDT	Details					
		0	Busan			2	
		1	Volskaya Industries			2	
		2	King's Row			1	
		1	Junkertown			3	

Countdown Cup

Qualifier match 1	August 06	London Spitfire	1	–	3	Toronto Defiant	Online
	3:00 pm EDT	Details					
		1	Ilios			2	
		1	Rialto			0	
		1	Temple of Anubis			2	
		2	Numbani			3	

Qualifier match 2	August 07	Toronto Defiant	3	–	0	Washington Justice	Online
	6:00 pm EDT	Details					
		2	Lijiang Tower			0	
		2	Havana			1	
		2	Hanamura			1	

Qualifier match 3	August 12	Paris Eternal	2	–	3	Toronto Defiant	Online
	3:00 pm EDT	Details					
		1	Oasis			2	
		2	Volskaya Industries			3	
		6	King's Row			5	
		3	Route 66			2	
		1	Nepal			2	

Qualifier match 4	August 14	San Francisco Shock	3	–	1	Toronto Defiant	Online
	6:00 pm EDT	Details					
		1	Busan			2	
		2	Hanamura			1	
		2	Numbani			0	

Regional semifinals	August 15	Paris Eternal	2	–	3	Toronto Defiant	Online
	3:00 pm EDT	Details					
		2	Lijiang Tower			1	
		0	Volskaya Industries			1	
		1	Blizzard World			2	
		3	Rialto			2	
		1	Oasis			2	

Regional finals	August 15	Toronto Defiant	1	–	3	Atlanta Reign	Online
	6:15 pm EDT	Details					
		1	Busan			2	
		3	Volskaya Industries			3	
		3	King's Row			5	
		1	Route 66			0	
		1	Oasis			2	

2021 season schedule

=== Postseason ===
2021 playoff game log
West Play-ins

Semifinals	September 4	Boston Uprising	0	–	3	Toronto Defiant	Online
	5:30 pm EDT	Details					
		1	Busan			2	
		1	Temple of Anubis			2	
		1	King's Row			3	

Finals	September 5	Toronto Defiant	0	–	3	San Francisco Shock	Online
	3:00 pm EDT	Details					
		0	Oasis			2	
		1	Volskaya Industries			2	
		0	Numbani			3	
