= 2021 Florida Mayhem season =

- Head coach: Kim "KuKi" Dae-kuk
- General manager: Albert Yeh
- Owner: Ben Spoont
- Region: West

Results
- Record: 5–11 (.313)
- Place: West: 10th; League: 16th
- May Melee: Lower finals
- June Joust: Did not qualify
- Summer Showdown: Did not qualify
- Countdown Cup: Did not qualify
- Season Playoffs: Did not qualify
- Total Earnings: $35,000

The 2021 Florida Mayhem season was the Florida Mayhem's fourth season in the Overwatch League and the team's second season under head coach Kim "KuKi" Dae-kuk. After starting the regular season with a promising 4–1 record, as well as a midseason tournament appearance, the Mayhem went 1–10 in their final 11 games. The team failed to qualify for any other midseason tournaments and did not qualify for the season playoffs.

== Preceding offseason ==
=== Roster changes ===
Free agents
| Position | Handle | Name | 2021 team | Date signed | Notes |
|---|---|---|---|---|---|
| Damage | BQB | Lee Sang-bum | Florida Mayhem | December 11 | – |
| Support | Byrem | Lee Seong-joo | – | – | – |
| Tank | Fate | Koo Pan-seung | Shanghai Dragons | November 11 | Option declined |
| Tank | Gargoyle | Lee Beom-jun | Florida Mayhem | December 11 | – |
| Tank | Karayan | Choi San-ha | – | – | – |
| Support | Kris | Choe Jun-su | – | – | – |
| Damage | Sayaplayer | Ha Jeong-woo | – | – | Option declined |
Legend Light green background indicates a player was re-signed by the Mayhem. Light red background indicates a player departed from the Mayhem.

The Mayhem entered free agency with seven free agents, two of which became free agents due to the Mayhem not exercising the option to retain the player for another year.

==== Acquisitions ====
The Mayhem signed three players to their roster on December 11, 2020; new acquisitions included Baek "Checkmate" Seung-hun, a rookie damage player from Overwatch Contenders Korea team OZ Gaming, Son "OGE" Min-seok, a tank player and four-year veteran of the Overwatch League who played for the Los Angeles Gladiators in the 2020 season, and Kim "SLIME" Sung-jun, a support player who reached the Overwatch League Grand Finals in 2019 and 2020 with the Vancouver Titans and Seoul Dynasty, respectively.

==== Departures ====
Five of the Mayhems's seven free agents did not return, one of whom signed with another team: tank player Koo "Fate" Pan-seung signed with the Shanghai Dragons on November 11, 2020. Additionally, damage player Ha "Sayaplayer" Jeong-woo retired from competitive Overwatch, while tank player Koo "Karayan" Pan-seung, support player Lee "Byrem" Seong-joo, and support player Choe "Kris" Jun-su did not sign with a team in the offseason.

== Regular season ==
The Mayhem began their 2021 season on April 17, playing against the Atlanta Reign in the May Melee qualifiers. They won their opener 1–3. Florida finished the qualifiers with a 3–1 record and advanced to the regional knockouts. After defeating the Toronto Defiant and the Washington Justice in the regional knockouts, the Mayhem advanced to the interregional tournament bracket. The team's first match in the double-elimination tournament was against the Shanghai Dragons. After a six-map series, which included a draw in one map, the Mayhem lost 2–3, sending them to the lower bracket of the tournament. In the first round of the lower bracket, Florida defeated the Chengdu Hunters 3–1. Their next match was again against the Dragons, as the Dragons fell to the lower bracket as well. Florida lost the match 0–3, eliminating them from the tournament.

After the strong start to the season, Florida struggled to continue their success. In the following tournament cycle, the June Joust, the Mayhem won only one of their three qualifier matches, failing to advance to the regional knockouts. In the Summer Showdown, the third tournament cycle of the season, the Mayhem began the qualifiers with two consecutive losses, putting them on a five-game losing streak. The poor performances by the team prompted the Mayhem to bench tank player Son "OGE" Min-seok and move damage player Baek "Checkmate" Seung-hun into the tank role. Florida Mayhem general manager Albert Yeh stated that the change was due to team's "poor results" since the May Melee. Florida won only more game in the season, finishing with a 5–11 record and did not qualify for the season playoffs.

== Final roster ==
2021 Florida Mayhem roster
Players
Coaches

| Role | No. | Handle | Name | Nationality |
|---|---|---|---|---|
| Damage | 22 | BQB | Lee Sang-bum | South Korea |
| Damage | 1 | Yaki | Kim Jun-ki | South Korea |
| Tank | 2 | OGE | Son Min-seok | South Korea |
| Tank | 3 | Gargoyle | Lee Beom-jun | South Korea |
| Tank | 0 | Checkmate | Baek Seung-hun | South Korea |
| Support | 28 | SLIME | Kim Sung-jun | South Korea |
| Support | 11 | Gangnamjin | Gang Nam-jin | South Korea |

Head coach

- Kim "KuKi" Dae-kuk

Legend:
- (I) Inactive
- (S) Suspended
- (2W) Two-way player
- Substitute
- (injured) Injury / Illness

Latest roster transaction: December 11, 2020.

== Standings ==
| Pos | Team | Pld | W | L | Pts | PCT | MW | ML | MT | MD | Qualification |
|---|---|---|---|---|---|---|---|---|---|---|---|
| 1 | Dallas Fuel | 16 | 11 | 5 | 17 | 0.688 | 40 | 26 | 3 | +14 | Advance to season playoffs |
| 2 | Los Angeles Gladiators | 16 | 11 | 5 | 14 | 0.688 | 41 | 21 | 0 | +20 | Advance to season playoffs |
| 3 | Atlanta Reign | 16 | 11 | 5 | 13 | 0.688 | 41 | 21 | 0 | +20 | Advance to season playoffs |
| 4 | San Francisco Shock | 16 | 12 | 4 | 12 | 0.750 | 43 | 24 | 2 | +19 | Advance to play-ins |
| 5 | Houston Outlaws | 16 | 11 | 5 | 11 | 0.688 | 34 | 24 | 3 | +10 | Advance to play-ins |
| 6 | Washington Justice | 16 | 9 | 7 | 9 | 0.563 | 29 | 26 | 2 | +3 | Advance to play-ins |
| 7 | Toronto Defiant | 16 | 9 | 7 | 9 | 0.563 | 31 | 31 | 0 | 0 | Advance to play-ins |
| 8 | Paris Eternal | 16 | 8 | 8 | 8 | 0.500 | 32 | 32 | 2 | 0 | Advance to play-ins |
| 9 | Boston Uprising | 16 | 7 | 9 | 7 | 0.438 | 27 | 31 | 1 | −4 | Advance to play-ins |
| 10 | Florida Mayhem | 16 | 5 | 11 | 6 | 0.313 | 26 | 38 | 2 | −12 | |
| 11 | London Spitfire | 16 | 1 | 15 | 1 | 0.063 | 12 | 47 | 1 | −35 | |
| 12 | Vancouver Titans | 16 | 1 | 15 | 1 | 0.063 | 10 | 45 | 0 | −35 | |

Source: The Overwatch League
Rules for classification: 1) points; 2) winning percentage (including tournaments); 3) regular season wins; 4) regular season map differential

== Game log ==
=== Regular season ===
2021 game log
May Melee

| Qualifier match 1 | April 17 | Atlanta Reign | 1 | – | 3 | Florida Mayhem | Online |
| | 4:30 pm EDT | Details | | | | | |
| | | 1 | Ilios | | | 2 | |
| | | 2 | Eichenwalde | | | 1 | |
| | | 0 | Watchpoint: Gibraltar | | | 1 | |
| | | 1 | Hanamura | | | 2 | |

| Qualifier match 2 | April 18 | Florida Mayhem | 3 | – | 1 | Vancouver Titans | Online |
| | 4:30 pm EDT | Details | | | | | |
| | | 2 | Nepal | | | 1 | |
| | | 3 | King's Row | | | 2 | |
| | | 1 | Havana | | | 2 | |
| | | 2 | Volskaya Industries | | | 1 | |

| Qualifier match 3 | April 30 | San Francisco Shock | 3 | – | 0 | Florida Mayhem | Online |
| | 4:30 pm EDT | Details | | | | | |
| | | 2 | Busan | | | 0 | |
| | | 2 | Hanamura | | | 1 | |
| | | 3 | Eichenwalde | | | 2 | |

| Qualifier match 4 | May 01 | Florida Mayhem | 3 | – | 1 | Paris Eternal | Online |
| | 3:00 pm EDT | Details | | | | | |
| | | 2 | Lijiang Tower | | | 0 | |
| | | 0 | Temple of Anubis | | | 1 | |
| | | 2 | Blizzard World | | | 1 | |
| | | 2 | Dorado | | | 1 | |

| Regional semifinals | May 02 | Toronto Defiant | 0 | – | 3 | Florida Mayhem | Online |
| | 3:00 pm EDT | Details | | | | | |
| | | 0 | Ilios | | | 2 | |
| | | 1 | Temple of Anubis | | | 2 | |
| | | 1 | King's Row | | | 2 | |

| Regional finals | May 02 | Florida Mayhem | 3 | – | 1 | Washington Justice | Online |
| | 6:30 pm EDT | Details | | | | | |
| | | 2 | Oasis | | | 1 | |
| | | 1 | Volskaya Industries | | | 2 | |
| | | 1 | King's Row | | | 0 | |
| | | 1 | Dorado | | | 0 | |

| Tournament first round | May 06 | Shanghai Dragons | 3 | – | 2 | Florida Mayhem | Online |
| | 10:00 pm EDT | Details | | | | | |
| | | 2 | Ilios | | | 0 | |
| | | 1 | Hanamura | | | 1 | |
| | | 1 | King's Row | | | 2 | |
| | | 1 | Watchpoint: Gibraltar | | | 0 | |
| | | 0 | Oasis | | | 2 | |
| | | 3 | Dorado | | | 2 | |

| Lower round 1 | May 07 | Florida Mayhem | 3 | – | 1 | Chengdu Hunters | Online |
| | 10:30 pm EDT | Details | | | | | |
| | | 2 | Lijiang Tower | | | 1 | |
| | | 2 | Volskaya Industries | | | 1 | |
| | | 2 | Blizzard World | | | 3 | |
| | | 4 | Havana | | | 3 | |

| Lower finals | May 08 | Shanghai Dragons | 3 | – | 0 | Florida Mayhem | Online |
| | 1:30 am EDT | Details | | | | | |
| | | 2 | Oasis | | | 0 | |
| | | 1 | Hanamura | | | 0 | |
| | | 2 | King's Row | | | 1 | |

June Joust

| Qualifier match 1 | May 21 | London Spitfire | 1 | – | 3 | Florida Mayhem | Online |
| | 4:30 pm EDT | Details | | | | | |
| | | 0 | Ilios | | | 2 | |
| | | 5 | Numbani | | | 4 | |
| | | 2 | Rialto | | | 3 | |
| | | 3 | Volskaya Industries | | | 4 | |

| Qualifier match 2 | May 23 | Florida Mayhem | 1 | – | 3 | Houston Outlaws | Online |
| | 6:00 pm EDT | Details | | | | | |
| | | 2 | Busan | | | 0 | |
| | | 0 | Eichenwalde | | | 3 | |
| | | 3 | Dorado | | | 4 | |
| | | 0 | Temple of Anubis | | | 1 | |

| Qualifier match 3 | June 03 | Dallas Fuel | 3 | – | 2 | Florida Mayhem | Online |
| | 4:30 pm EDT | Details | | | | | |
| | | 1 | Lijiang Tower | | | 2 | |
| | | 3 | Hanamura | | | 2 | |
| | | 4 | Hollywood | | | 3 | |
| | | 1 | Junkertown | | | 3 | |
| | | 2 | Oasis | | | 0 | |

| Qualifier match 4 | June 04 | Florida Mayhem | 0 | – | 3 | Washington Justice | Online |
| | 6:00 pm EDT | Details | | | | | |
| | | 0 | Oasis | | | 2 | |
| | | 1 | Temple of Anubis | | | 2 | |
| | | 1 | Eichenwalde | | | 3 | |

Summer Showdown

| Qualifier match 1 | June 26 | Florida Mayhem | 2 | – | 3 | Toronto Defiant | Online |
| | 4:30 pm EDT | Details | | | | | |
| | | 1 | Ilios | | | 2 | |
| | | 2 | Hollywood | | | 1 | |
| | | 3 | Watchpoint: Gibraltar | | | 1 | |
| | | 2 | Hanamura | | | 3 | |
| | | 0 | Lijiang Tower | | | 2 | |

| Qualifier match 2 | June 27 | Boston Uprising | 3 | – | 0 | Florida Mayhem | Online |
| | 4:30 pm EDT | Details | | | | | |
| | | 2 | Nepal | | | 1 | |
| | | 3 | King's Row | | | 3 | |
| | | 3 | Junkertown | | | 2 | |
| | | 3 | Volskaya Industries | | | 2 | |

| Qualifier match 3 | July 03 | Dallas Fuel | 3 | – | 2 | Florida Mayhem | Online |
| | 4:30 pm EDT | Details | | | | | |
| | | 2 | Lijiang Tower | | | 1 | |
| | | 1 | Watchpoint: Gibraltar | | | 2 | |
| | | 2 | Hanamura | | | 0 | |
| | | 3 | Hollywood | | | 4 | |
| | | 2 | Oasis | | | 0 | |

| Qualifier match 4 | July 04 | Washington Justice | 3 | – | 0 | Florida Mayhem | Online |
| | 6:00 pm EDT | Details | | | | | |
| | | 2 | Oasis | | | 0 | |
| | | 3 | Route 66 | | | 2 | |
| | | 2 | Temple of Anubis | | | 1 | |

Countdown Cup

| Qualifier match 1 | August 07 | Florida Mayhem | 2 | – | 3 | Atlanta Reign | Online |
| | 4:30 pm EDT | Details | | | | | |
| | | 0 | Oasis | | | 2 | |
| | | 3 | Havana | | | 2 | |
| | | 2 | Hanamura | | | 0 | |
| | | 1 | Numbani | | | 3 | |
| | | 1 | Nepal | | | 2 | |

| Qualifier match 2 | August 08 | Boston Uprising | 1 | – | 3 | Florida Mayhem | Online |
| | 3:00 pm EDT | Details | | | | | |
| | | 1 | Nepal | | | 2 | |
| | | 4 | Route 66 | | | 3 | |
| | | 0 | Volskaya Industries | | | 1 | |
| | | 2 | Blizzard World | | | 3 | |

| Qualifier match 3 | August 12 | Florida Mayhem | 1 | – | 3 | Houston Outlaws | Online |
| | 4:30 pm EDT | Details | | | | | |
| | | 0 | Busan | | | 2 | |
| | | 3 | Volskaya Industries | | | 2 | |
| | | 3 | Blizzard World | | | 3 | |
| | | 2 | Route 66 | | | 3 | |
| | | 0 | Ilios | | | 2 | |

| Qualifier match 4 | August 13 | Florida Mayhem | 1 | – | 3 | Los Angeles Gladiators | Online |
| | 6:00 pm EDT | Details | | | | | |
| | | 0 | Ilios | | | 2 | |
| | | 0 | Temple of Anubis | | | 1 | |
| | | 3 | King's Row | | | 2 | |
| | | 2 | Rialto | | | 3 | |

2021 season schedule
