= Eternal Academy =

- Founded: 2019
- League: Overwatch Contenders
- Division: Atlantic
- Region: Europe
- Team history: Eternal Academy; 2019–present
- Based in: Paris, France
- Colors: Blue, burgundy, gold
- Owner: DM Esports
- Affiliation: Paris Eternal

Eternal Academy was a French esports team for the video game Overwatch competing in Overwatch Contenders (OWC) and an academy team for the Paris Eternal of the Overwatch League (OWL). The team is based in Paris, France and plays in the Europe region of OWC.

== Franchise history ==
On 27 February 2019, the Paris Eternal announced their Overwatch Contenders academy team as Eternal Academy. They began in the Europe region of Contenders in 2019 Season 1, led by head coach Johan "CWoosH" Klingestedt.

In their first season, Eternal heavily struggled and was only able to amass a 2–5 regular season record, placing last in Europe. Due to their poor performance, they were relegated to Contenders Trials and had to perform well enough to get promoted back into Contenders for 2019 Season 2. However, they failed to qualify for Contenders, marking the first time that an academy failed to do so. Following, Paris Eternal announced that they would be dropping their academy team, making Eternal Academy the third academy team to drop out of Contenders.

Six months later, on 13 December 2019, Eternal Academy announced that they would be competing in Contenders 2020 Season 1.

== Seasons overview ==
Year	Season	Region	OWC regular season				Regional playoffs	Interregional events
Year	Season	Region	Finish	Wins	Losses	Win %	Regional playoffs	Interregional events
Eternal Academy
2019	1	Europe	7th	2	5	.286		
2019	2	Europe	Did not qualify					
2020	1	Europe	–	2	2	.500		
2020	2	Europe	Did not compete					
Regular season record				4	7	.364		
Playoff record				0	0	–		

== Current roster ==
Eternal Academy roster
Players	Coaches
Role / Handle / Name / Nationality	Head coach: David Strid
Legend: (I) Inactive; (S) Suspended; (2W) Two-way player; Substitute; (injured) Injury / Illness	Latest roster transaction: 25 April 2020.

== OWL buyouts and promotions ==
All Overwatch Contenders players are eligible to be promoted by their affiliated Overwatch League team or signed to any other Overwatch League during specified non-blackout periods.
