= Eichenwalde =

Video game multiplayer map

- Overwatch location
- Aerial view of Eichenwalde, with the castle in the background.
- First appearance: Overwatch (2016)
- Last appearance: Overwatch (2023)
- Created by: Blizzard Entertainment
- Genre: Science fiction

In-universe information
- Type: Castle

Eichenwalde is a map and fictional location in the 2016 online multiplayer hero shooter Overwatch and its 2023 sequel of the same name. The first new map to ever be added to the game following release, Eichenwalde is set within an ancient German castle and the surrounding abandoned village. In the series' fictional lore, Eichenwalde was the location of one of the worst battles of the Omnic Crisis, a catastrophic global event in which robots known as Omnics went rogue and began to attack humans, leading to the formation of the Overwatch organization to deal with the crisis. It is a hybrid "payload" map, in which players must first capture an area and then escort a hovering battering ram up a hill and into the castle where the corpse of the leader of a group of heavily armored "Crusaders", Balderich von Adler, is located.

Eichenwalde is heavily linked to the characters Reinhardt, who fought alongside Balderich, and Bastion, a formerly rogue Omnic who was deactivated in the same area. A steampunk, gothic horror version of Eichenwalde known as Adlersbrunn appears in the Junkenstein's Revenge Halloween event, where it is the castle of the mad scientist Dr. Junkenstein, an alternate-universe version of Junkrat based heavily on Dr. Frankenstein. The map was well-regarded by critics for its design and visual storytelling, though the map was noted by multiple critics as being difficult for the attacking team.

== Design ==
The attacking team in the map initially starts within a beer hall in the town surrounding the Eichenwalde castle, while the defenders start in an outer fortification of the castle. Attackers push through a choke point involving a small archway beneath a bridge in order to emerge in the main plaza where the high-tech battering ram is being held. After capturing the battering ram, attackers escort it up a winding path towards the castle's entrance, and use it to break down the closed wooden portcullis. They then continue to escort it through the now-opened entrance and towards Balderich's armor, the map ending when it reaches the armor, or if attackers run out of time.

== Development ==
The idea for Eichenwalde was inspired by the idea of creating a "cool location" within the game's focus on exotic locales. The map was designed to be highly vertical due to feedback from players who wanted more vertical space and openness. In 2016, Aaron Keller, assistant game director of Overwatch, considered the difficulty players were having with the map to be temporary until players learned the map's layout better, though he also admitted that "there probably is a defender advantage on this map" and that the team was looking at it internally. Soon after, a patch was released that increased the payload speed in response to fan complaints, giving more of an advantage to attackers. In 2017, a doorway was added in the map's initial choke point, helping attackers take an alternate path to capture the payload.

The map includes a Bonfire from the Dark Souls series as a hidden Easter egg. In the Adlersbrunn version, it is replaced by a Lamp from Bloodborne, another FromSoftware game.

== Reception ==
In her review of the Eichenwalde map, Heather Alexandra of Kotaku described it as a "difficult map from the start", calling it "not a playing field for 50/50 play" and noting that the defending team has the advantage of high ground. However, she also called this aspect what made it one of the most exciting maps in the entire game. She called the initial choke point, where attackers have to cross underneath a small bridge, what defined the map. Once attackers are able to breach this choke point, she noted that they are temporarily at an advantage due to the difficulty for defenders to return to protect the area. Once the battering ram is captured, however, she stated her opinion that the defenders regain the advantage as it is escorted uphill. The last portion of the map, which takes place inside the castle, was described as a drastic change that forces adaptation on the part of players. Nathan Grayson of the same publication wrote that "right now, the balance isn’t quite right", but said that he enjoyed it regardless, calling it a "tactician’s dream" due to its "treacherous cracks and clever crevices".

Nicholas Bashore of Inverse said that the map "feels like a worthy addition to Overwatch’s lineup — all thanks to its narrow corridors and tight hallways". Describing it as "a little tilted towards the defending team provided they know what they’re doing", he singled out the final control point as a "huge concern' from a competitive standpoint because the defending team could "easily lock it down". Nevertheless, he described it as "an absolute blast to play". Jordan Devore of Destructoid said he was "digging this map", calling it "relentless". In response to the map's 2017 rework, Suriel Vazquez of Game Informer said that he was excited for the change, saying that the "initial capture point there was the hardest bottleneck to break for many teams".
