= Blizzard World =

Video game multiplayer map

- Overwatch location
- Aerial view of Blizzard World as seen from a distance, with the Warcraft (right), StarCraft (center) and Diablo (left) areas visible.
- First appearance: Overwatch (2016)
- Last appearance: Overwatch (2023)
- Created by: Blizzard Entertainment
- Genre: Science fiction

In-universe information
- Type: Theme park

Blizzard World is a map and fictional location in the 2016 online multiplayer hero shooter Overwatch and its 2023 sequel of the same name. Introduced in 2018 and set within an in-universe Blizzard Entertainment-based theme park revolving around various Blizzard franchises such as Warcraft and StarCraft, it is a hybrid "payload" map in which players must first capture an area and then escort a hovering cart from one end of the park to the other by fighting off defenders, or lose the match. It was generally praised for its extreme level of detail and amount of Easter egg references to other Blizzard IPs, though it was criticized by some for its similarity to other maps of that mode.

The map also functions as proof of concept for a real Blizzard-based theme park, which journalists have suggested could be built, surmising that, given the existence of BlizzCon, a theme park would be an even more profitable and popular fan destination. In 2018, it was estimated that building a physical Blizzard World would cost a minimum of US$219 million, and likely significantly more.

== Design ==
Most of Blizzard World is composed of a World of Warcraft–style castle, the overall layout having a resemblance to Disneyland, which is across from Anaheim Convention Center where BlizzCon is held. The attacking team starts in Hearthstone Tavern, a medieval fantasy-style building immediately after the park ticket booths where visitors play the collectible card game Hearthstone. The defending team starts inside a Heroes of the Storm-themed arcade. To capture the initial point, attackers must proceed through the park's main gates, a major choke point, along a path that splits in two and then re-merges, though there are additional smaller side paths.

Once the payload is captured, players lead it along a main boulevard that goes through various attractions, such as a StarCraft-inspired "Pylon Terrace" and a Diablo area with raised platforms and deadly pitfalls. With only a third of the park actually being traversable, various other unreachable areas of the park can be seen in the distance, including Murloc Island, Orgrimmar and the Hellscream roller coaster.

== Development ==
An anonymous source from within Blizzard claimed that the map was internally referred to as "Blizzneyland". In 2018, then–game director and Blizzard vice-president Jeff Kaplan described the map as a "complete passion project" for the team that was inspired by a much older concept art drawn by artist Peter Lee during the development of the cancelled Titan. This ultimately inspired assistant game director Aaron Keller to suggest creating the map. The team used D.Va being an in-universe StarCraft player as justification that the existence of Blizzard was canon within Overwatch, enabling them to go ahead with the idea. The team thought of numerous ideas for attractions and hired the original voice actors of various characters to record lines played over loudspeakers. From a technical standpoint, it was Overwatch's most complex map up to that point and caused engine tech optimizers to have difficulty fitting in all the small details, including transparent windows or breakable objects that were taxing on performance.

The map's production process included game directors and art directors from all the major franchises included within the map. One example was that Ben Thompson, art director of Hearthstone, personally supervised the design and layout of the Hearthstone Tavern.

Kaplan stated that while fans may believe the map was created purely for Blizzard marketing, its purpose was actually a joke and a "love letter" to Blizzard franchises that the team "had to get out of our systems". A hanging shark was placed within the level referencing the concern that Blizzard "jumped the shark" by creating such a gimmicky level.

== Reception ==
Jennifer Young of Windows Central praised the map as a "fun love letter to all of Blizzard’s iconic universes". Cecilia D'Anastasio of Kotaku expressed disappointment with the map, saying that despite its "cute Easter eggs", it was a "cookie-cutter hybrid map" that was "a lot like King’s Row, a map with a somewhat straightforward strategy". She described it as plainer than most of the game's other payload maps and existing largely to "showcase Blizzard’s numerous accomplishments and hype players for the publisher’s other games".

In 2018, David Lumb of Engadget calculated what it would take to make Blizzard World a real theme park, using lead writer Michael Chu's size estimate of over 100 acres. Comparing it to Legoland in size and scope, he made a low estimate of US$219 million, assuming 2 million people visited in its first year. He said that the cost would likely be higher due to rising land prices and face fierce competition from top theme parks, though it had a strong and recognizable roster of popular entertainment franchises that would put it above other small parks. He also noted BlizzCon's attendance as an argument for the fact that fans would attend such a park in real life. The 2026 creation of XP, a branch of Xbox dedicated to expanding Microsoft franchises beyond video games, including the creation of theme parks, prompted Young to also call for Blizzard World to be made into a real location, describing it as a "money maker" that it was surprising that Blizzard had not actually built. Also citing the large popularity and attendance of BlizzCon, as well as the high cost of tickets and travel, she also noted that many fans were aging millennials with kids and that Blizzard World could function as a less-wasteful and more immersive year-round replacement for BlizzCon because it would also be making a constant profit from visitors. If a full theme park was not feasible, she suggested making it a less-costly "expansion land" within an existing park, similar to Minecraft World in Chessington World of Adventures.
