= Paris Eternal =

American professional esports team

- Founded: 7 September 2018
- League: Overwatch League
- Region: West
- Team history: Paris Eternal (2018–2022); Vegas Eternal (2023–present)
- Based in: Paris, France; Las Vegas, Nevada
- Colors
- Owner: Drew McCourt
- Head coach: Diana "Empress" W.
- General manager: Kim "AVALLA" Kyoung-ey
- Affiliation: Eternal Academy
- Website: Official website

Uniforms

The Paris Eternal was a French professional Overwatch esports team based in Paris, France. The Eternal competed in the Overwatch League (OWL) as a member of the league's West region. Founded in 2018, Paris Eternal began play as an OWL expansion team in 2019 and is one of two professional Overwatch teams based in Europe. The team is owned by Drew McCourt, owner of DM Esports, who also owns Eternal Academy, an academy team for the Eternal that competed in Overwatch Contenders. The team moved to Las Vegas, Nevada prior to the 2023 season, rebranding as the Vegas Eternal, but they later disbanded on October 6th, 2023.

== Franchise history ==
=== OWL expansion ===
On 7 September 2018, Activision Blizzard announced that DM Esports owner Drew McCourt (son of Frank McCourt owner of Olympique de Marseille) had purchased an expansion team based in Paris for Overwatch League's second season for more than $20 million. On the investment of the franchise, McCourt noted, "Du point de vue d'investisseur à l'échelle mondiale dans le domaine du sport traditionnel, le développement de l'e-sport, et de l'Overwatch League notamment, est remarquable (translated: From a global investor's point of view in traditional sports, the development of e-sport, and the Overwatch League in particular, is remarkable)."

On 8 November, the team held a launch party in which they revealed their team name as Paris Eternal, as well as their entirely European roster and coaches.

=== Early years: 2019–present ===
On 16 February, Paris Eternal had its first regular season match against the defending 2018 OWL champions London Spitfire, in which Paris claimed a convincing 3–1 victory. Paris ended Stage 1 with a 3–4 record and did not qualify for the Stage 1 Playoffs. After Stage 1, head coach Julien "Daemon" Ducros left the team and was replaced by Félix "Féfé" Münch. Paris ended the season with a disappointing 11–17 record, did not manage to yield a winning record in any stage, and did not qualify for any of the stage playoffs nor the season playoffs.

On 24 October 2019, the Eternal signed former Element Mystic head coach Yun "Rush" Hee-won as their new head coach. The Eternal relocated to New Jersey in efforts minimize travel time to the live matches in North America and Asia that were planned to take place throughout the season, while still expecting to play their home matches in Paris. However, all live matches were canceled after the first few weeks of play, due to the COVID-19 pandemic. Competing in the league's newly formed North America region, Paris found more success in won their first tournament championship on 6 July 2020, after taking down the San Francisco Shock in the North America Summer Showdown finals. Paris finished the regular season with 15 wins, 4 bonus wins from midseason tournaments, and 6 losses, claiming the third seed in the North America season playoffs. However, a 0–3 loss to the Washington Justice on 6 September in the North America playoffs ended their season.

Following the end of the 2020 season, all players and staff, other than general manager Kim "AVALLA" Kyoung-ey, were released or traded to other teams due to financial difficulties. The Eternal fully rebuilt their roster, signing four veteran players and three rookies — all from Europe. The team also brought on former Overwatch Contenders coach Zouheir "GetAmazed" Baba as their new head coach. Competing in the league's Western region, formerly known as the North America region, the Paris Eternal players played their games remotely, with members scattered across a continent. The team struggled throughout the first half of the season, losing several players to retirement and failing to make it past the qualifiers in either of the two first tournament cycles. The Eternal reached the regional knockout stage for the first time in the season, after going 3–1 in the Summer Showdown qualifiers. However, they lost to the Washington Justice in the first round of the knockouts. Paris failed to reach the season playoffs after losing to the Justice in the 2021 Overwatch League season#play-in tournament, finishing the season in eighth place in the West region.

In the 2021 offseason, the Paris Eternal released three of their seven players and released head coach Zouheir "GetAmazed" Baba, promoting assistant coach Choi "JMac" Dae-han to the head coach position.

== Team identity ==
On 8 November 2018, the Eternal brand was officially unveiled. The team name alludes to the eternal flame that has burned under the Arc de Triomphe in Paris since 1921. The logo depicts an infinity symbol inscribed within the Gallic rooster, France's national symbol. The team's colors were blue, burgundy, white, and gold, with the former three colors reflecting that of the French flag. On 1 June 2022, it was announced that the team would be relocating to Las Vegas after the 2022 season.

== Personnel ==
=== Current roster ===
Vegas Eternal roster
Players	Coaches
Role / No. / Handle / Name / Nationality	Head coach: Vacant
Legend: (I) Inactive; (S) Suspended; (2W) Two-way player; Substitute; (injured) Injury / Illness	Latest roster transaction: October 6, 2023.

=== Head coaches ===
Handle	Name	Seasons	Record	Notes	Ref.
Daemon	Julian Ducros	2019	3–4 (.429)	Released after seven games in 2019	
Féfé	Félix Münch	2019	8–13 (.381)		
Rush	Yun Hee-won	2020	15–6 (.714)		
GetAmazed	Zouheir Baba	2021	8–8 (.500)		
JMac	Choi Dae-han	2022	1–23 (.042)		
Empress	Diana W.	2023	0–16 (.000)		

== Awards and records ==
=== Seasons overview ===
Season	P	W	L	W%	Finish	Playoffs
2019	28	11	17	.393	5th, Atlantic	Did not qualify
2020	21	15	6	.714	2nd, North America	Lost in NA Lower Round 1, 0–3 (Justice)
2021	16	8	8	.500	8th, West	Did not qualify
2022	24	1	23	.042	13th, West	Did not qualify
2023	16	0	16	.000	13th, West	Did not qualify

=== Individual accomplishments ===
Role Star selections

- SP9RK1E (Kim Yeong-han) – 2020
- FDGoD (Brice Monsçavoir) – 2020

All-Star Game selections

- Kruise (Harrison Pond) – 2019
- BenBest (Benjamin Dieulafait) – 2020
- SoOn (Terence Tarlier) – 2020
- NiCOgdh (Nicolas Moret) – 2020
- FDGoD (Brice Monsçavoir) – 2020

== Academy team ==
On 27 February 2019, the Paris Eternal announced their Overwatch Contenders academy team as Eternal Academy. After finishing with a 2–5 record in their first season, Eternal Academy became the first OWL academy team to fail to qualify for the next Contenders season; they finished Season 2 Trials in fourth place with a record of 2–3. Six months later, on 13 December 2019, Eternal Academy announced that they would be competing in Contenders 2020 Season 1.

== See also ==
- Paris Legion
