= 2021 Overwatch League Grand Finals =

2021 Overwatch League championship match

2021 OWL Grand Finals
Atlanta Reign	Shanghai Dragons
0	4
- Date: September 25, 2021
- Venue: Online
- Purse: $2.2 million
- MVP: Lee "LIP" Jae-won

Live Broadcast
- Broadcast(s): YouTube; Bilibili

The 2021 Overwatch League Grand Finals was the fourth championship match of the Overwatch League (OWL), taking place on September 25, 2021. The series was the conclusion of the 2021 Overwatch League playoffs and was played between the Shanghai Dragons and the Atlanta Reign. The final was originally planned to be played at the Galen Center in Los Angeles, California; however, due to the increasing threat of COVID-19 and the delta variant, the match was shifted to be played online.

Shanghai qualified for the season playoffs as the top seed and defeated the San Francisco Shock, Los Angeles Gladiators, and Dallas Fuel all in the upper bracket of the tournament. Atlanta qualified as the fifth seed and was defeated in the first round by the Chengdu Hunters but went on to defeat the Washington Justice, Los Angeles Gladiators, San Francisco Shock, and Dallas Fuel in the lower bracket.

In the Grand Finals match, the Dragons swept the Reign by a score of 4–0 to win their first OWL championship.

== Road to the Grand Finals ==
The Grand Finals are the post-season championship series of the Overwatch League (OWL), a professional international esports league; the teams in the 2021 Grand Finals match competed for a $2.2 million prize pool, where the winners received $1.5 million. The 2021 season was the fourth season in OWL history and consisted of twenty teams. Owing to the COVID-19 pandemic, most regular season and midseason tournament matches were played online. The playoffs were contested by eight teams – five from the league's West region and three from the league's East region.

The finalists, the Atlanta Reign and the Shanghai Dragons, finished the 2021 regular season with records of 11–5 and 12–4, respectively. The Dragons claimed the top seed in the season playoffs, while the Reign entered as the fifth seed. The two teams faced each other twice throughout the 2021 season – in the June Joust and Summer Showdown tournaments. Both times, the Dragons defeated the Reign by a score of 3–0. The defending OWL champions, the San Francisco Shock, were eliminated in the third round of the lower bracket of the season playoffs, while the 2020 runners-up, the Seoul Dynasty, failed to qualify for the 2021 playoffs after being eliminated in the play-in tournament.

=== Atlanta Reign ===
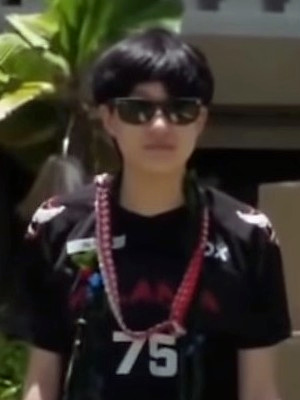
OWL Rookie of the Year Oh "Pelican" Se-hyun.

The Reign joined the league in 2019 as one of eight expansion teams. After a mediocre 2020 season, the Reign elected to not re-sign all six of their free agents in the offseason, which included damage players Garrett "Saucy" Roland and Joon "Erster" Jeong, tank players Park "Pokpo" Hyun-jun and Nathan "frd" Goebel, and support players Dusttin "Dogman" Bowerman and Anthony "Fire" King. Additionally, the team released damaged player Hugo "SharP" Sahlberg. Atlanta signed two players in the offseason: damage players Oh "Pelican" Se-hyun and Kai "Kai" Collins.

The Reign began their 2021 season with a loss to Florida Mayhem in the May Melee qualifiers. After going 1–3 in the May Melee qualifiers, the Reign failed to the regional knockouts. The team found success in the following tournament cycle, the June Joust; after going 3–1 in the qualifiers, the Reign defeated the San Francisco Shock in the regional knockout finals to advance to the June Joust tournament. However, the team lost in the lower bracket finals to the Dragons by a 0–3 scoreline. Atlanta found similar results in the Summer Showdown, defeating the Los Angeles Gladiators in the regional finals to advance to their second consecutive midseason tournament. The Reign ultimately fell in the first round of the lower bracket in a 2–3 loss to the Dallas Fuel. In the final tournament cycle, the Countdown Cup, the Reign qualified for their third consecutive tournament appearance. However, Reign rookie Oh "Pelican" Se-hyun suffered a collapsed lung prior to the tournament. Atlanta fell in the tournament to the Chengdu Hunters by a score of 0–3. The team finished the regular season with 11 wins, 5 losses, 13 league points, and the fifth seed in the season playoffs. Oh "Pelican" Se-hyun was awarded the league's Rookie of the Year award and was an MVP candidate for the 2021 regular season.

In the first round of the playoffs, the Reign fell to the third-seeded Chengdu Hunters, 2–3, sending Atlanta to the lower bracket of the tournament. Atlanta ran through the lower bracket, defeating the eighth-seeded Washington Justice, 3–0, the fourth-seeded Los Angeles Gladiators, 3–2 the sixth-seeded San Francisco Shock, 3–1, and the second-seeded Dallas Fuel, 3–1.

=== Shanghai Dragons ===
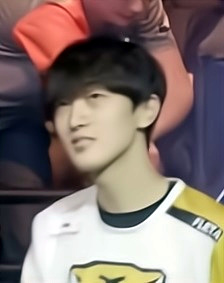
Kim "Fleta" Byung-sun of the Shanghai Dragons.

The Shanghai Dragons entered the league in 2018 as one of the twelve founding franchises. In the offseason preceding the 2021 season, the team made several roster changes. The team elected not to re-sign all five of their free agents: damage players Yang "Dding" Jin-hyeok, Lu "Diya" Weida, and Bae "Diem" Min-seong, tank player Kim "Geguri" Se-yeon, and support player Yang "Luffy" Sung-hyeon, although Diem was signed back to the team later in the offseason. Additionally, the Dragons transferred tank player Lee "Fearless" Eui-seok to the Dallas Fuel, and released tank player Seo "Stand1" Ji-won. Additions to the team included tank player Koo "Fate" Pan-seung, who was acquired from the Florida Mayhem, damage player Jeong "Erster" Jun, and support player He "Molly" Chengzhi.

The Dragons' first match of the 2021 season resulted in a win over the Guangzhou Charge in the May Melee qualifiers. After defeating the Philadelphia Fusion in the Eastern regional knockouts, the Dragons entered the May Melee tournament, the first of four midseason double-elimination tournaments in the regular season, as the second-seeded Eastern team. The team fell to the Dallas Fuel in the upper bracket finals, dropping them to the lower bracket of the tournament; the Dragons reached the finals of the tournament through the lower bracket, where they once again lost to the Fuel. Prior to the start of the June Joust qualifiers, damage player Joon "Erster" Jeong retired. Looking to add depth to their roster, the Dragons signed damage player Lee "WhoRU" Seung-jun several days later. The team won three of their four June Joust qualifying matches to advance them to the regional knockouts. Several days before the knockouts began, the Dragons lost another player to retirement in damage player Bae "Diem" Min-seong; once again looking for depth, the team signed damage player Chae "Develop" Rak-hoon shortly afterwards. The Dragons advanced to the June Joust tournament after defeating the Seoul Dynasty in the regional knockouts. The team lost their first match of the tournament, again to the Fuel; however, after making it to the finals through the lower bracket, the Dragons defeated the Fuel to claim their first title of the 2021 season. The Dragons continued their success throughout the Summer Showdown, winning all four of their qualifying matches and advancing past the regional qualifiers. Prior to the start of the Summer Showdown tournament, the team added former Dragons player Kim "Daemin" Dae-min as a coach. The Dragons went undefeated in the tournament, and after defeating the Chengdu Hunters in the finals, they claimed their second consecutive midseason tournament title. In the final tournament cycle of the regular season, the Countdown Cup, the Dragons went 2–2 in the qualifiers, failing to advance to the regional knockouts for the first time in the season; Dragons' head coach Moon "Moon" Byung-chul stated that they were "resting" their players during the tournament cycle. The team finished the regular season with 12 wins, 4 losses, 20 league points, and the top seed in the season playoffs. Kim "Fleta" Byung-sun, Lee "Lip" Jae-won, and Kim "Izayaki" Min-chul were all MVP candidates for the 2021 regular season. Additionally, Lee "Lip" Jae-won, Kang "Void" Jung-woo, Kim "Izayaki" Min-chul, and Lee "Leejaegon" Jae-gon were awarded Role Star commendations for damage, tank, support, and support, respectively.

Shanghai selected the sixth-seeded San Francisco Shock as their opponent for the first round of the season playoffs; the Dragons swept the Shock, 3–0. The team next defeated the fourth-seeded Los Angeles Gladiators by a score of 3–1. Moving on to the upper bracket finals, the Dragons faced the second-seeded Dallas Fuel, marking the fifth time the two teams had played each other in a midseason or season playoff match in the 2021 season. Despite keeping the maps close, the Dragons came out with a 3–1 victory to advance the Grand Finals bracket.

=== Summary of results ===
Qualified playoff teams
Seed	Team	Region	Points	Record	MR	MD
1	Shanghai Dragons	East	20	12–4	38–19–2	+19
2	Dallas Fuel	West	17	11–5	40–26–3	+14
3	Chengdu Hunters	East	15	11–5	38–22–2	+16
4	Los Angeles Gladiators	West	14	11–5	41–21–0	+20
5	Atlanta Reign	West	13	11–5	41–21–0	+20
6	San Francisco Shock	West	12	12–4	43–24–2	+19
7	Philadelphia Fusion	East	10	10–6	37–24–3	+13
8	Washington Justice	West	9	9–7	29–26–2	+3

Atlanta Reign playoffs matches
Round	Opponent	Score
Upper round 1	(3) Chengdu Hunters	2–3
Lower round 1	(8) Washington Justice	3–0
Lower round 2	(4) Los Angeles Gladiators	3–2
Lower round 3	(6) San Francisco Shock	3–1
Lower final	(2) Dallas Fuel	3–1

Shanghai Dragons playoffs matches
Round	Opponent	Score
Upper round 1	(6) San Francisco Shock	3–0
Upper round 2	(4) Los Angeles Gladiators	3–1
Upper final	(2) Dallas Fuel	3–1

== Venue and ticketing ==
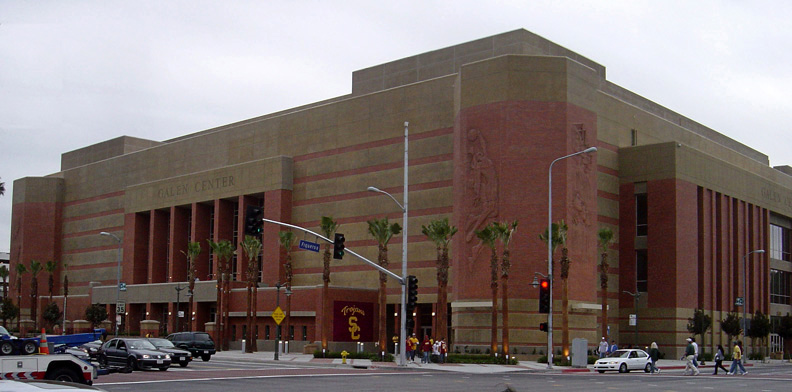
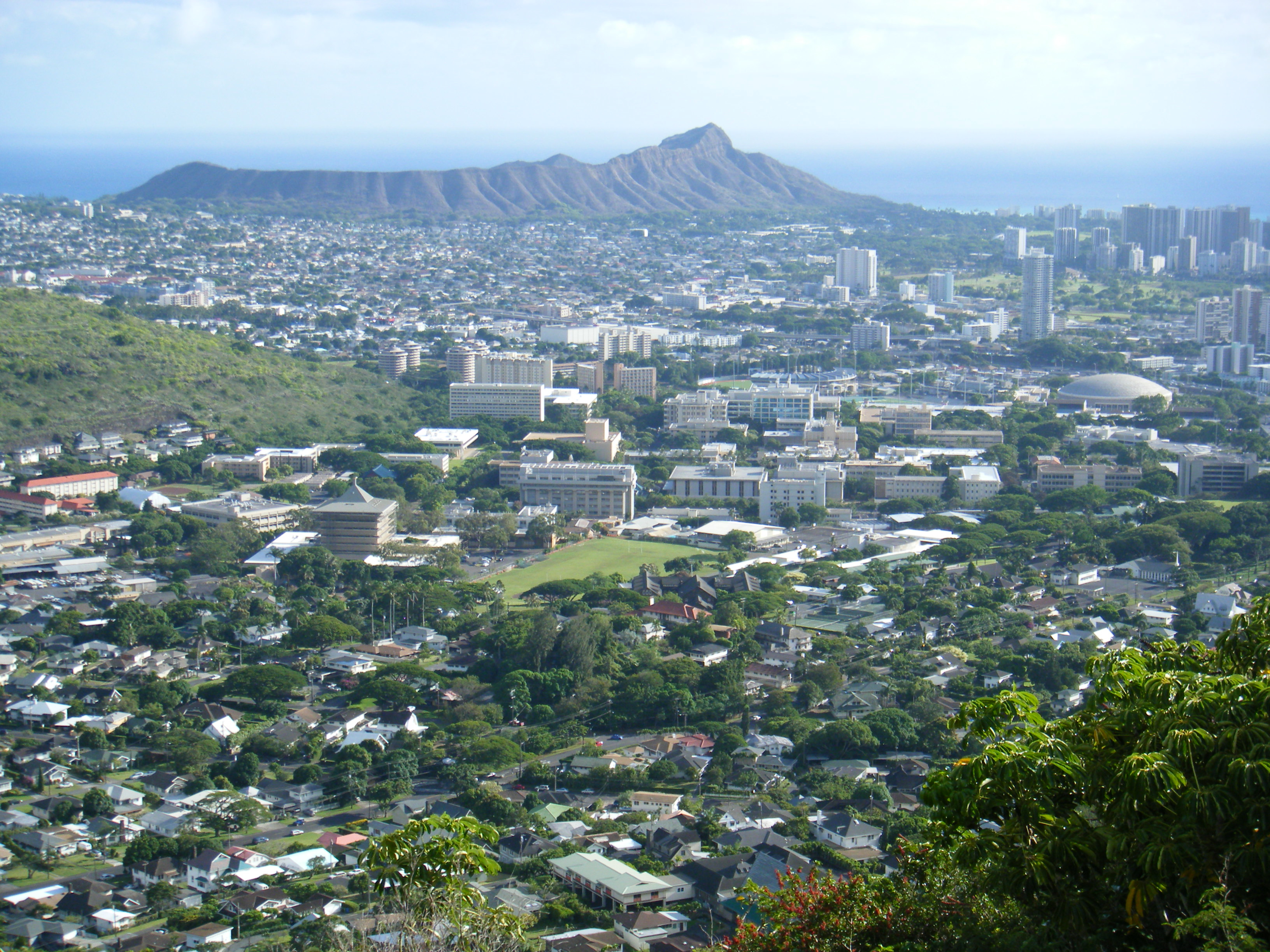
The Grand Finals was planned to be played at the Galen Center (left). Western teams instead travelled to the University of Hawaiʻi at Mānoa (right).

The Galen Center in Los Angeles, California was announced as the 2021 OWL Grand Finals host venue on July 20, 2021. The Galen Center opened in 2006 at a cost of $147 million and has a seating capacity of 10,258. It is the home arena of the USC Trojans basketball and USC Trojans women's volleyball. The arena has been the site of a number of other notable events, including the premier of High School Musical 3 in 2008, several Nickelodeon's Kids' Choice Awards, the League of Legends: Season 2 World Championship, Microsoft's E3 conferences, The X Factor audition stages in 2011 and 2013, and the 2015 Teen Choice Awards. It will also be the host of badminton for the 2028 Olympics. Ticket sales for the finals were planned to go on sale in August 2021.

However, the OWL announced on August 25, 2021, that all playoff matches, including the Grand Finals, would not be played in a live format due to increasing risks of COVID-19 and the Delta variant. Instead, to minimize latency between competing teams, the Atlanta Reign team played at the University of Hawaiʻi at Mānoa, while the Shanghai Dragons played in their home country.

== Broadcast and viewership ==
The Grand Finals broadcast live on YouTube, as they hold exclusive rights to all Overwatch League broadcasts outside of China. The match reached a global average minute audience (AMA), a metric created by Nielsen that provides a similar viewership number to that of linear TV, of 1.68 million — an 8% increase over the 2020 Grand Finals. According to the league, this made it the most-watch OWL match of all time. The match had an AMA of 218 thousand, a 36% over the 2020 Grand Finals, on YouTube specifically. In China, where it was streamed on Bilibili, the viewership increased by 5% from the previous year.

== Entertainment ==
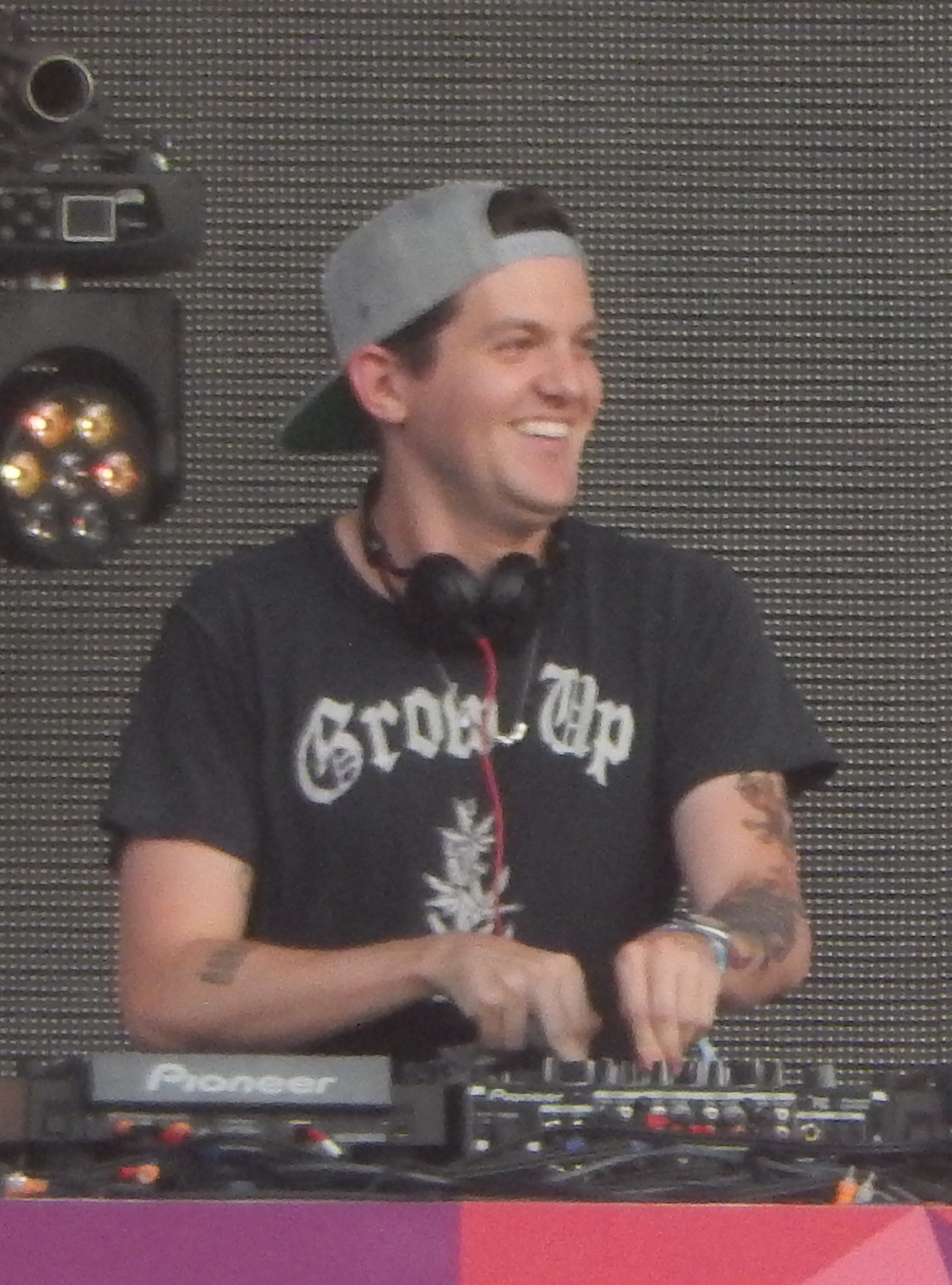
Dillon Francis performed for the 2021 Grand Finals.

=== Preshow ===
New hero updates for the upcoming Overwatch 2 were revealed during the event's preshow, which be made for the release of Overwatch 2. Namely, Blizzard showed gameplay changes to the heroes Sombra and Bastion. Additionally, Bastion's "new look" was featured.

=== Opening ceremony ===
On September 24, 2021, DJ, electronic musician, and record producer Dillon Francis announced that he would be performing during the Grand Finals Opening Ceremony. The performance was only available to be viewed online and was the first musical performance at a Grand Finals since Zedd performed during the 2019 Opening Ceremony. The set included songs from Francis' previous records and from his, at the time, upcoming album Happy Machine.

=== Halftime ===
Blizzard announced in September 2021 that the Overwatch League's fifth season will be played on an early version of Overwatch 2. During the halftime of the Grand Finals, players from eliminated playoff teams played an exhibition match on an early build of Overwatch 2. The two five-man teams consisted of players from the Los Angeles Gladiators and Washington Justice. The teams played on one of Overwatch 2's new maps Rome in a new game mode called Push.

== Match summary ==
Grand Finals	September 25	Atlanta Reign	0	–	4	Shanghai Dragons	Online
	6:00 pm PDT	Details					
		0	Ilios			2	
		2	Hanamura			3	
		5	King's Row			6	
		2	Havana			3	

== Rosters ==
=== Atlanta Reign ===
2021 Atlanta Reign roster
Players
Coaches

Role	No.	Handle	Name	Nationality
Damage	7	Edison	Kim Tae-hoon	South Korea
Damage	75	Pelican	Oh Se-hyun	South Korea
Damage	17	Kai	Collins, Kai	United Kingdom
Tank	1	Gator	Scott, Blake	United States
Tank	8	Hawk	Domecq, Xander	United States
Support	20	Ir1s	Kim Seung-hyun	South Korea
Support	66	Masaa	Kantanen, Petja	Finland

Head coach

- Brad "Sephy" Rajani

Legend:
- (I) Inactive
- (S) Suspended
- (2W) Two-way player
- Substitute
- (injured) Injury / Illness

Latest roster transaction: February 11, 2021.

=== Shanghai Dragons ===
2021 Shanghai Dragons roster
Players
Coaches

Role	No.	Handle	Name	Nationality
Damage	70	LIP	Lee Jae-won	South Korea
Damage	1	Fleta	Kim Byung-sun	South Korea
Damage	23	WhoRU	Seung-jun Lee	South Korea
Damage	3	Develop	Chae Rak-hoon	South Korea
Tank	7	Fate	Koo Pan-seung	South Korea
Tank	57	Void	Kang Jun-woo	South Korea
Support	2	LeeJaeGon	Lee Jae-gon	South Korea
Support	22	Izayaki	Kim Min-chul	South Korea
Support	66	Molly	He Chengzhi	China

Head coach

- Moon "Moon" Byung-chul

Legend:
- (I) Inactive
- (S) Suspended
- (2W) Two-way player
- Substitute
- (injured) Injury / Illness

Latest roster transaction: June 10, 2021.
