= 2021 Overwatch League playoffs =

2021 Overwatch League Playoffs

Tournament information
- Game: Overwatch
- Dates: September 21–25, 2021
- Administrator: Activision-Blizzard
- Venue: Online
- Teams: 8
- Purse: $3,200,000

Tournament statistics
- Matches played: 14

Grand Finals
- Dates: September 25
- Venue: Online
- Champion: Shanghai Dragons
- Runner-up: Atlanta Reign
- Finals MVP: Lee "LIP" Jae-won

The 2021 Overwatch League playoffs was the postseason tournament of the 2021 Overwatch League regular season. The tournament began on September 21 and concluded with the 2021 Grand Finals, the fourth championship match of the Overwatch League (OWL) on September 25.

Eight teams contested the OWL playoffs, a double-elimination tournament, with the final two teams remaining in the tournament advancing to the Grand Finals. Each playoff match was originally planned take place at Esports Stadium Arlington in Arlington, Texas, aside from the final at the Galen Center in Los Angeles, California. However, due to increasing threat of COVID-19 and the delta variant, the matches were shifted to be played online.

The defending OWL champions were the San Francisco Shock, who won the title against the Seoul Dynasty in the 2020 OWL Grand Finals. The Shanghai Dragons swept the Atlanta Reign in the Grand Finals to win their first OWL championship.

== Format ==
Eight teams qualified for the season playoffs. In the league's West region, five teams qualified: the top three teams based on the Western regular season standings and the top two teams from the Western play-in tournament. In the league's East region, three teams qualified: the top two teams based on the Eastern regular season standings and the top team from the Eastern play-in tournament. The team with the most league points between the top seed in the West and top seed in the East was the first overall seed, while the other was the second seed. The team with the most league points between the second seed in the West and second seed in the East was the third overall seed, while the other was the fourth seed. The third seeded team in the West was the fifth overall seed. The three teams that qualified for the playoffs via the play-in tournaments were seeded sixth through eight based on league points. Any ties in league points were broken by the league's tiebreaking rules.

The playoffs were a double-elimination tournament. The top three seeds selected their opponent from seeds five through eight for the first round of the tournament, with the top seed selecting first and the third seed selecting last. In each match, the higher-seeded team had the choice of which map to play first from a pool of maps. Each following map was chosen by the losing team from the previous map. The winner of each match was determined by which team wins three maps first, aside from the Grand Finals, which was first-to-four. No hero pools, a system in which some heroes are unplayable, was used in the postseason.

== Venues ==
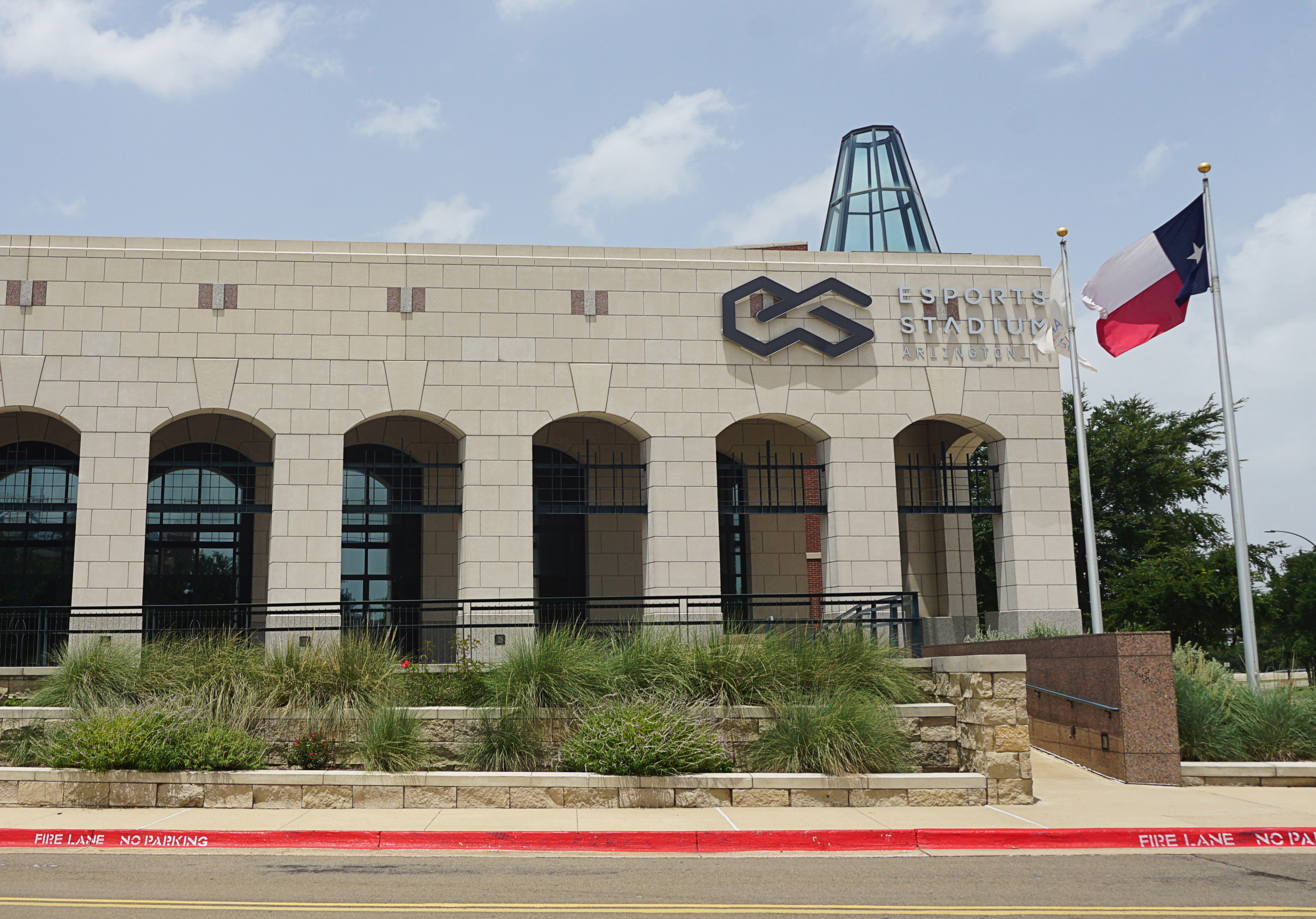
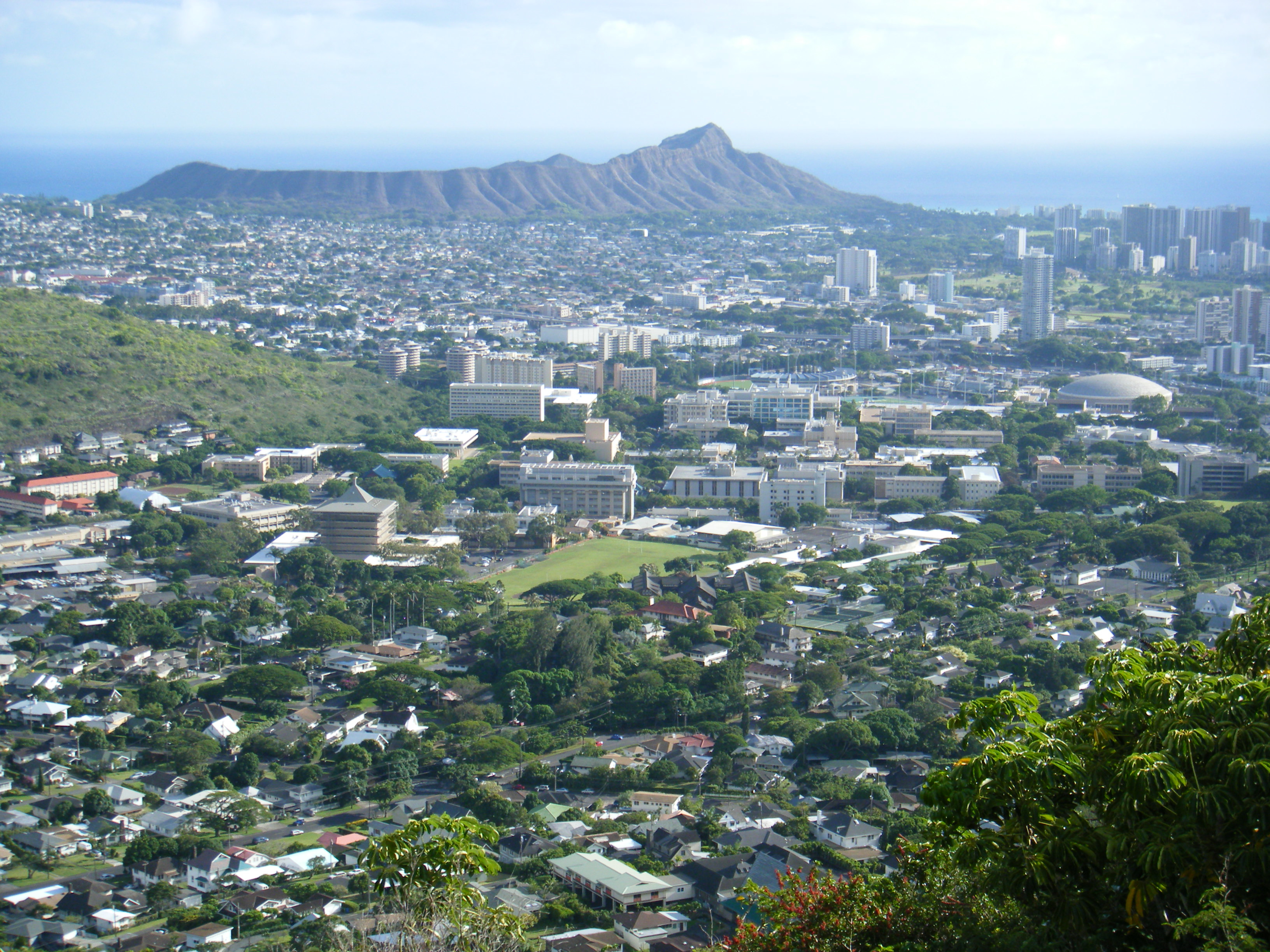
All matches except for the Grand Finals were originally planned to take place at Esports Stadium Arlington (left). Western teams instead travelled to the University of Hawaiʻi at Mānoa (right).

All matches were originally planned to be played at Esports Stadium Arlington in Arlington, Texas, aside from the Grand Finals, which was to take place at the Galen Center in Los Angeles, California. Although several live matches were held in the regular season in limited formats, the playoffs and Grand Finals were to be one of the first esports live events held in North America since the COVID-19 pandemic.

On August 25, 2021, due to visa difficulties and concerns surrounding Delta variant, all in-person playoff events were cancelled. To minimize latency between the East and West teams, the West region playoff teams travelled to the University of Hawaiʻi at Mānoa and played at the Innovation Lab and Information Technology Center buildings, while the East region teams played in their home country. The broadcasts were hosted from an outdoor stage at the Moana Hotel in Honolulu.

== Participants ==
Seed	Team	Region	Points	Record	MR	MD
1	Shanghai Dragons	East	20	12–4	38–19–2	+19
2	Dallas Fuel	West	17	11–5	40–26–3	+14
3	Chengdu Hunters	East	15	11–5	38–22–2	+16
4	Los Angeles Gladiators	West	14	11–5	41–21–0	+20
5	Atlanta Reign	West	13	11–5	41–21–0	+20
6	San Francisco Shock	West	12	12–4	43–24–2	+19
7	Philadelphia Fusion	East	10	10–6	37–24–3	+13
8	Washington Justice	West	9	9–7	29–26–2	+3

== Bracket ==
Upper round 1 September 21	Upper round 2 September 22	Upper final September 23	Grand Finals; September 25
1	Shanghai Dragons	3
6	San Francisco Shock	0
1	Shanghai Dragons	3
4	Los Angeles Gladiators	1
4	Los Angeles Gladiators	3
7	Philadelphia Fusion	1
1	Shanghai Dragons	3
2	Dallas Fuel	1
2	Dallas Fuel	3
8	Washington Justice	1
2	Dallas Fuel	3
3	Chengdu Hunters	0
3	Chengdu Hunters	3
5	Atlanta Reign	2	1	Shanghai Dragons	4
5	Atlanta Reign	0
Lower round 1 September 22	Lower round 2 September 23	Lower round 3 September 24	Lower final September 24
3	Chengdu Hunters	2
6	San Francisco Shock	3	6	San Francisco Shock	3	2	Dallas Fuel	1
7	Philadelphia Fusion	2	6	San Francisco Shock	1	5	Atlanta Reign	3
5	Atlanta Reign	3
4	Los Angeles Gladiators	2
5	Atlanta Reign	3	5	Atlanta Reign	3
8	Washington Justice	0

== Matches ==
=== Upper round 1 ===
Upper round 1	September 21	Washington Justice	1	–	3	Dallas Fuel	Online
	4:00 pm PDT	Details					
		2	Lijiang Tower			1	
		1	Volskaya Industries			2	
		2	King's Row			3	
		3	Havana			4	

Upper round 1	September 21	Philadelphia Fusion	1	–	3	Los Angeles Gladiators	Online
	5:30 pm PDT	Details					
		0	Ilios			2	
		2	Temple of Anubis			1	
		2	King's Row			3	
		1	Havana			3	

Upper round 1	September 21	San Francisco Shock	0	–	3	Shanghai Dragons	Online
	7:00 pm PDT	Details					
		1	Ilios			2	
		0	Hanamura			1	
		2	King's Row			3	

Upper round 1	September 21	Atlanta Reign	2	–	3	Chengdu Hunters	Online
	8:30 pm PDT	Details					
		2	Nepal			0	
		3	Temple of Anubis			4	
		4	King's Row			3	
		2	Dorado			3	
		0	Oasis			2	

=== Lower round 1 ===
Lower round 1	September 22	Washington Justice	0	–	3	Atlanta Reign	Online
	4:00 pm PDT	Details					
		0	Nepal			2	
		0	Temple of Anubis			2	
		1	King's Row			3	

Lower round 1	September 22	Philadelphia Fusion	2	–	3	San Francisco Shock	Online
	5:30 pm PDT	Details					
		1	Nepal			2	
		3	Volskaya Industries			2	
		3	King's Row			4	
		3	Route 66			2	
		0	Ilios			2	

=== Upper round 2 ===
Upper round 2	September 22	Chengdu Hunters	0	–	3	Dallas Fuel	Online
	7:00 pm PDT	Details					
		0	Lijiang Tower			2	
		2	Volskaya Industries			3	
		0	Eichenwalde			3	

Upper round 2	September 22	Los Angeles Gladiators	1	–	3	Shanghai Dragons	Online
	8:30 pm PDT	Details					
		0	Ilios			2	
		2	Hanamura			0	
		0	Numbani			1	
		0	Havana			1	

=== Lower round 2 ===
Lower round 2	September 23	Atlanta Reign	3	–	2	Los Angeles Gladiators	Online
	4:00 pm PDT	Details					
		0	Ilios			2	
		3	Hanamura			2	
		5	King's Row			4	
		1	Dorado			2	
		2	Nepal			0	

Lower round 2	September 23	San Francisco Shock	3	–	2	Chengdu Hunters	Online
	6:00 pm PDT	Details					
		2	Lijiang Tower			0	
		3	Temple of Anubis			3	
		4	King's Row			3	
		2	Dorado			3	
		0	Ilios			2	
		2	Havana			0	

=== Upper final ===
Upper final	September 23	Dallas Fuel	1	–	3	Shanghai Dragons	Online
	7:30 pm PDT	Details					
		0	Ilios			2	
		3	Volskaya Industries			2	
		2	Numbani			3	
		1	Dorado			3	

=== Lower round 3 ===
Lower round 3	September 24	San Francisco Shock	1	–	3	Atlanta Reign	Online
	6:00 pm PDT	Details					
		2	Nepal			2	
		2	Hanamura			3	
		1	King's Row			3	
		2	Havana			3	

=== Lower final ===
Lower final	September 24	Atlanta Reign	3	–	1	Dallas Fuel	Online
	7:30 pm PDT	Details					
		1	Lijiang Tower			2	
		2	Hanamura			1	
		4	King's Row			3	
		3	Dorado			2	

=== Grand Finals ===
Grand Finals	September 25	Atlanta Reign	0	–	4	Shanghai Dragons	Online
	6:00 pm PDT	Details					
		0	Ilios			2	
		2	Hanamura			3	
		5	King's Row			6	
		2	Havana			3	

== Winnings ==
Teams in the season playoffs competed for a total prize pool of US$3.2 million, with the payout division detailed below.

Pos	Team	Bonus
1	Shanghai Dragons	$1,500,000
2	Atlanta Reign	$700,000
3	Dallas Fuel	$350,000
4	San Francisco Shock	$250,000
5	Chengdu Hunters	$150,000
6	Los Angeles Gladiators	$150,000
7	Philadelphia Fusion	$50,000
8	Washington Justice	$50,000
