= Galen Center =

Multipurpose indoor arena in Los Angeles, US

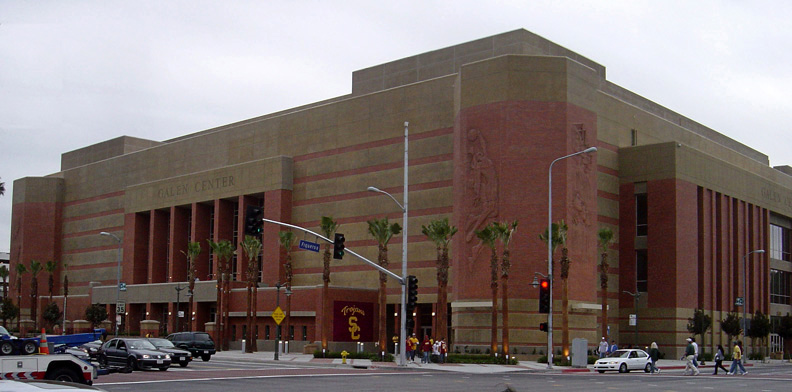
- The arena's north corner in November 2006

- Location in L.A. metro area Location in California Location in the United States
- Address: 3400 S. Figueroa Street
- Location: Los Angeles, California, U.S.
- Coordinates: 34.021°N 118.280°W
- Owner: University of Southern California
- Capacity: Basketball: 10,258; Ice Hockey: 8,500
- Public transit: Jefferson/USC

Construction
- Groundbreaking: October 30, 2004
- Opened: October 12, 2006
- Cost: US$147 million (US$235 million in 2025 dollars)
- Architect: HNTB
- Structural engineers: John A. Martin & Associates
- Services engineers: M-E Engineers, Inc.
- General contractor: Clark Construction Group

Tenant
- USC Trojans (NCAA) (2006–present)

Website
- galencenter.org

The Galen Center is a multipurpose indoor arena and athletic facility owned and operated by the University of Southern California. Located at the southeast corner of Jefferson Boulevard and Figueroa Street in the Exposition Park area of Los Angeles, California, United States, it is right across the street from the campus and near the Shrine Auditorium. The Galen Center is the home of the USC Trojans basketball and USC volleyball; in addition it hosts concerts, pageants, theatrical performances, high school graduation ceremonies, CIF championships and the Academic Decathlon. The annual Kids' Choice Awards were held here from 2011 to 2014, and returned in 2017 and 2019.

== History ==
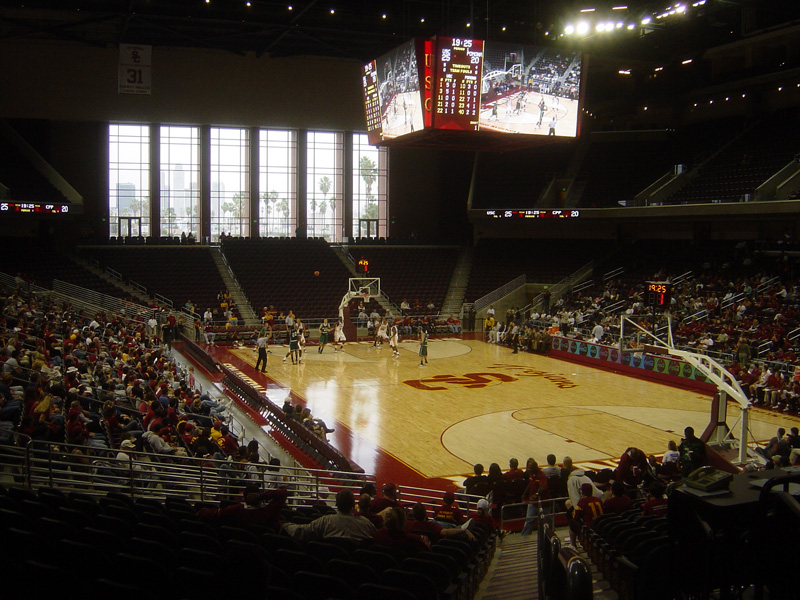
Interior during an exhibition basketball game against Cal Poly Pomona

USC had planned to build an on-campus indoor arena for more than 100 years. Before the Galen Center, USC basketball had been played at a variety of locations, including the neighboring Shrine Auditorium stage, the old Pan-Pacific Auditorium in the Fairfax District, and from 1959 onward at the Los Angeles Memorial Sports Arena.

The final push to build the new facility began in 2002, when Louis Galen, a successful banker and longtime Trojan fan, and his wife Helene donated $10 million to the new center immediately after USC football quarterback Carson Palmer won the 2002 Heisman Trophy. The Galens donated an additional $25 million to the project to have the building named after them and later upped their donation an additional $15 million to make sure that a connected practice facility would also bear their name, bringing the total donation to $50 million. Previously, the USC men's and women's basketball teams practiced at the smaller, on-campus North Gym. The Galen Center replaced the Los Angeles Memorial Sports Arena as the home for USC men's and women's basketball.

Construction cost an estimated $147 million, which includes the arena, team offices, and a state-of-the-art practice facility. The largest tax revenue would be generated by the city of Los Angeles' 10% parking tax. Other sources of tax revenue will include sales tax, utility users tax, business license tax, and income from advertising. In addition, two new parking structures were built: a 1,200-space structure located between the USC Hotel and the arena, with access from Flower Street, and a second structure at the southeast corner of Figueroa Street and Exposition Boulevard. The additional parking structures also increased the available parking for both the USC campus and the nearby Los Angeles Memorial Coliseum.

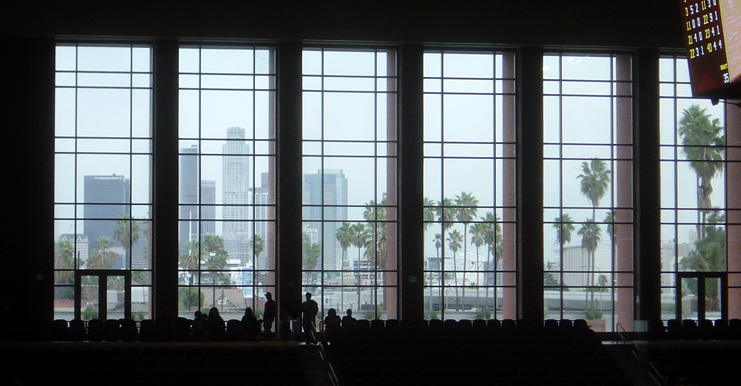
View of Downtown Los Angeles from the Galen Center's unique window

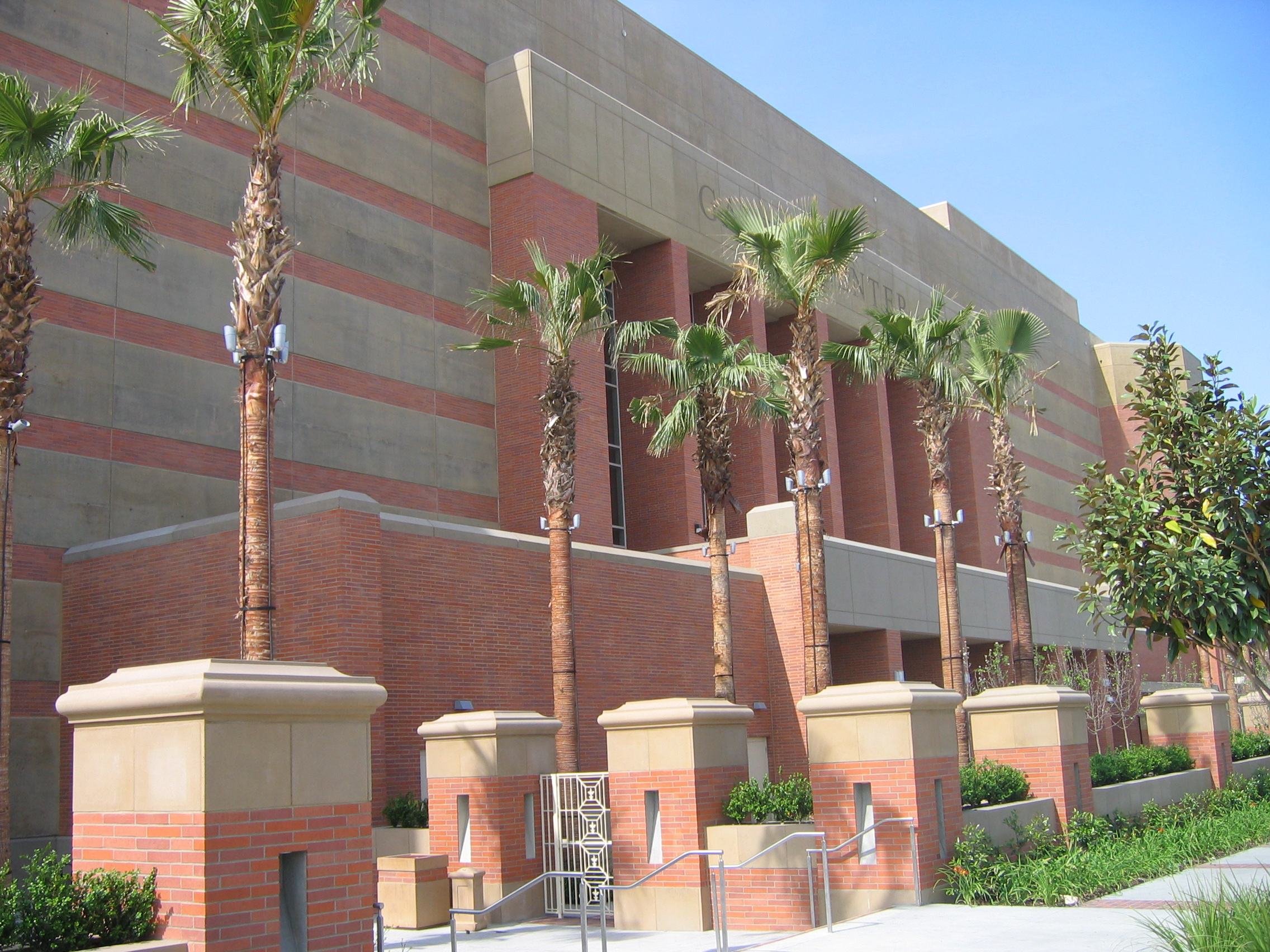
Building exterior

The architectural firm behind the design of the Galen Center is HNTB. Construction officially began on October 31, 2004, with a groundbreaking ceremony including Los Angeles City Council members Bernard Parks and Jan Perry along with Helene and Louis Galen, longtime USC fans for whom the facility is named.

The first event, a women's volleyball game between USC and Stanford, took place on October 12, 2006. The first concert at the center was October 21, 2006 and featured Al Green. The first men's basketball game was held on November 16 against the University of South Carolina. The first sellout crowd was the men's basketball game against the UCLA Bruins on January 12, 2007, with an attendance of 9,682. The highest attendance in the first year was for the Cal Bears men's basketball game on February 24, 2007, at 10,027.

On January 31, 2008, the USC men's basketball game against the Arizona Wildcats set the arena's attendance record with crowd of 10,258 in attendance.

On May 10, 2014, the arena hosted a heavyweight title boxing fight between Chris Arreola and Bermane Stiverne for the vacant World Boxing Council Heavyweight Title. Stiverne won the title after a sixth-round knockout of Arreola, becoming the first Haitian-born boxer to win a world heavyweight championship, as well as the first out of the province of Quebec, to win the WBC world heavyweight championship.

== Jim Sterkel Court ==
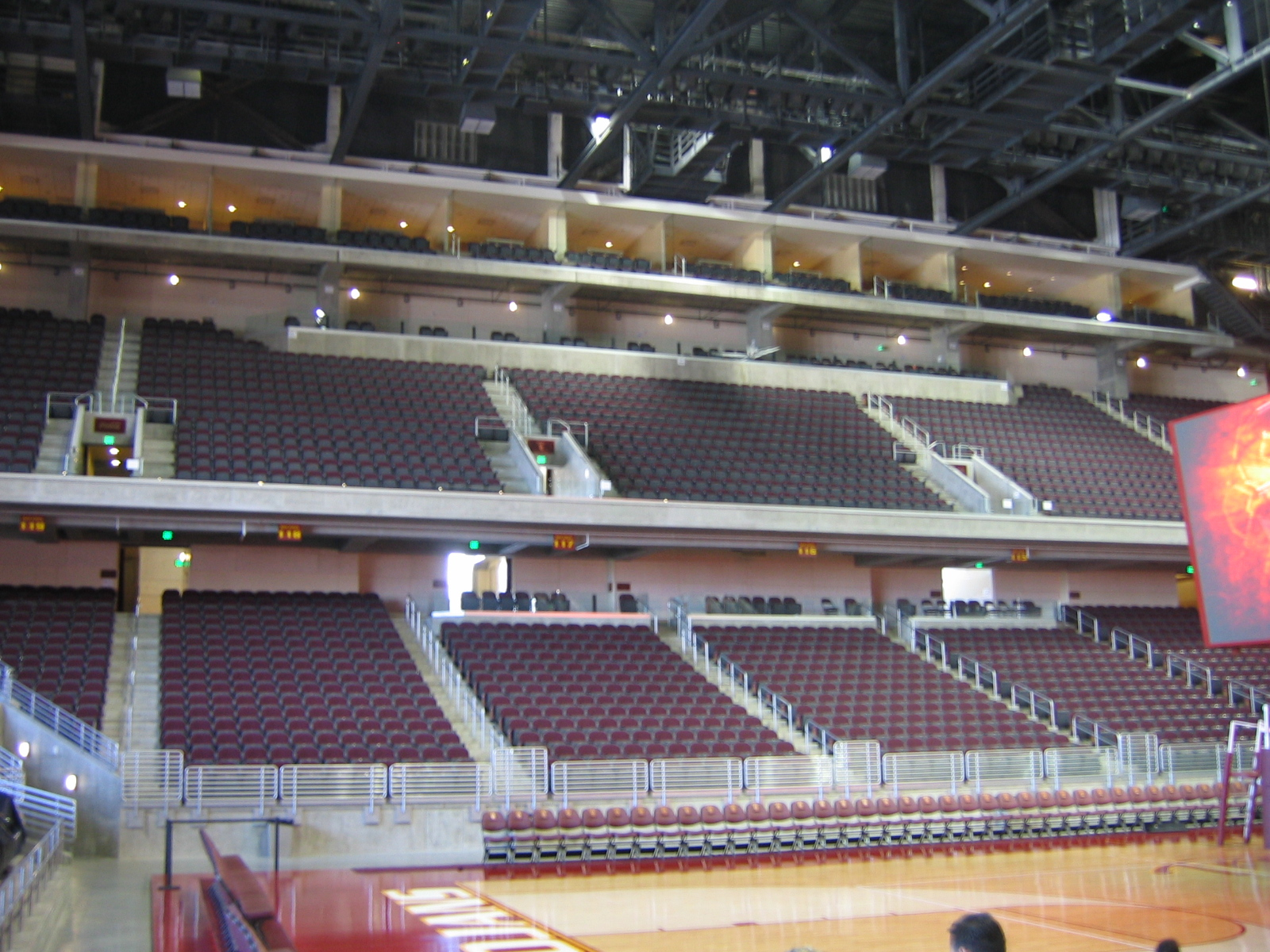
Interior, with premium seating on third Level

The Galen Center's basketball court was named after former USC basketball player Jim Sterkel, who played for the Trojans for two seasons in the 1950s, averaging 10 points a game. Two unique factors in the naming rights were the obscurity of the name choice and that the Sterkel family was not aware that the court was named after the late Jim Sterkel until after the facility had already opened. An anonymous donor made the $5 million donation under the agreement that his name never be revealed. In an interview with Los Angeles Times columnist Bill Plaschke, who tracked down the donor but did not reveal his name, 'Anonymous' said that he grew up with Sterkel: both attended Mark Keppel High School, both began at USC in 1955 and were roommates. 'Anonymous' later hired Sterkel and helped pay for his treatment when Sterkel was diagnosed with cancer. When the son of the anonymous donor contracted leukemia, Sterkel wrote a poem and sealed it to be read only when the son had died. Sterkel later died in 1997, with the son dying two years later. Inspired by the poem and his friendship with Sterkel, 'Anonymous' made the donation and named the court after his friend, saying, "Some people don't deserve to be forgotten." B. Wayne Hughes, a longtime friend of Sterkel's, was revealed to be the donor by the Times in 2019, as part of a longer profile of Hughes.

== Facility information ==
The facility is 255,000 square feet (23,700 m^{2}), with a 45,000 square feet (4,200 m^{2}) pavilion, and has three practice courts and offices. The seating capacity is 10,258 and there are 22 private suites. The rights to purchase tickets for approximately ⅓ of the seats are being sold through lifetime personal seat licenses, ranging from $2,500–$10,000 per seat.

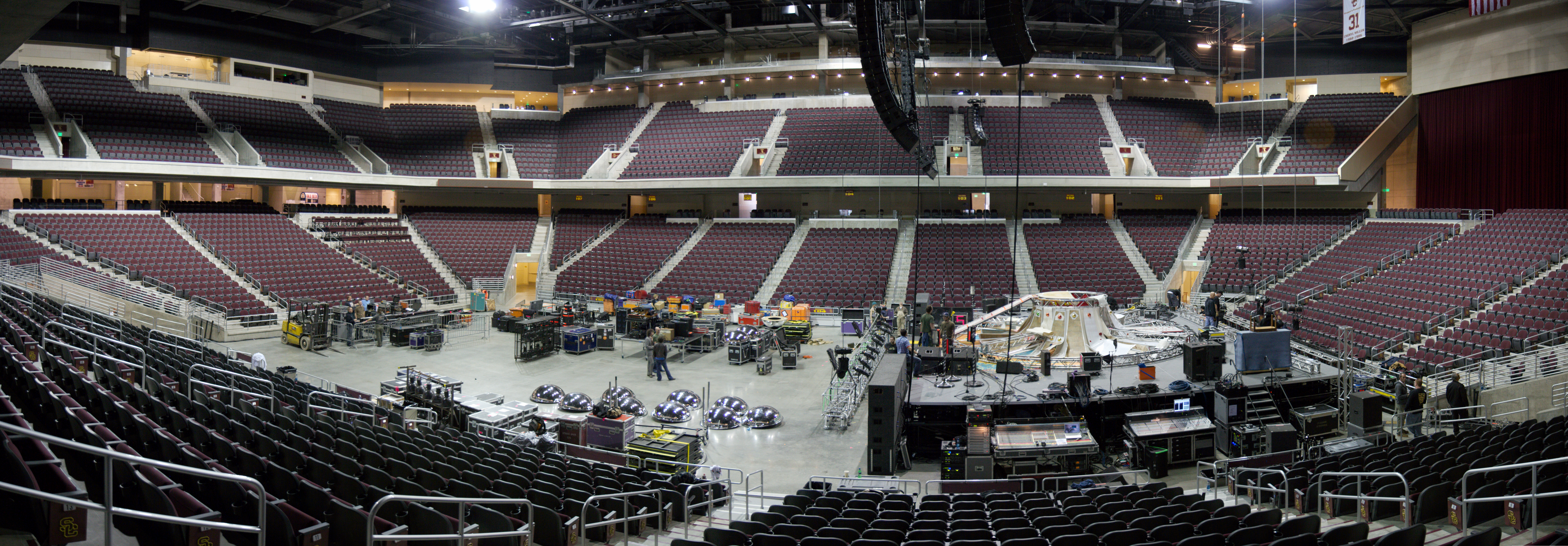
The full arena in concert configuration

== Events ==
- Taiwanese singer Jay Chou held his first concert on December 24, 2007, for his World Tour 2007.
- Jeopardy! taped its 2007 College Championship at the venue on April 30 and May 11 of that year.
- The venue was the temporary home of the Nickelodeon's Kids' Choice Awards while renovations occurred at UCLA's Pauley Pavilion beginning with the 2011 ceremony. The Galen hosted the KCA ceremonies from 2011 to 2014, then the network returned in 2017, and once again in 2019.
- LAPD Cadets of Class 1-11 was held in May 2011.
- A Los Angeles Lakers practice game was held on December 16, 2011.
- Microsoft's E3 press conferences are held traditionally at the arena.
- The 2012 League of Legends Season 2 World Championship finals, and the 2013 World Championship semi-finals were held at Galen Center.
- In 2011 and 2013, it played host to the Los Angeles audition stages of the Fox singer search program The X Factor. The 2013 auditions were held on March 6.
- WBA Heavyweights Chris Arreola and Bermane Stiverne battled for the Championship Belt on May 10, 2014.
- For the first time, the 2015 Teen Choice Awards were held in the Galen Center on August 16, 2015.
- Morrissey performed a special New Year's Eve concert on December 31, 2015.
- Game 3 of the 2016 WNBA Finals between the Los Angeles Sparks and the Minnesota Lynx was held on October 14, 2016.
- Showtime Championship Boxing presented Jesus Cuellar vs. Abner Mares on December 10, 2016.
- Maze featuring Frankie Beverly performed an R&B concert on June 23, 2017.
- The 2021 Call of Duty League Championship was held from August 19–22, 2021.
- Livestreamer Ludwig Ahgren hosted the Mogul Chessboxing Championship in the Galen Center on December 11, 2022.
- Ring of Honor held the pay-per-view event Supercard of Honor on March 31, 2023
- The 2024 Apex Legends Global Series Split 1 Playoffs was held from May 2–5, 2024.

=== 2028 Summer Olympics and Paralympics ===
During the 2028 Summer Olympics, Galen Center will host rhythmic gymnastics and badminton. During the 2028 Summer Paralympics, it will host badminton and wheelchair rugby.

== See also ==
- List of NCAA Division I basketball arenas

== Bibliography ==
- Norwood, Robyn (October 12, 2006). "Galen Center Time Flies When They Have Funds". Los Angeles Times.
