= USC Trojans basketball =

USC Trojans basketball may refer to either of the basketball teams that represent the University of Southern California:

- USC Trojans men's basketball
- USC Trojans women's basketball
