= 2019 Boston Uprising season =

- Head coach: Vacant
- Owner: Robert Kraft
- Division: Atlantic

Results
- Record: 8–20 (.286)
- Place: Atlantic: 9th; League: 19th
- Stage 1 Playoffs: Quarterfinals
- Stage 2 Playoffs: Did not qualify
- Stage 3 Playoffs: Did not qualify
- Season Playoffs: Did not qualify
- Total Earnings: $25,000

The 2019 Boston Uprising season was the second season of Boston Uprising's existence in the Overwatch League.

The team finished the season with an 8–20 record – a far cry from their 26–14 record from 2018. A 3–2 victory over the Dallas Fuel in the final match of Stage 1 gave the Uprising a 4–3 record and qualified them for the Stage 1 Playoffs. However, they were eliminated in the quarterfinals after a 0–3 loss to the Vancouver Titans. Boston struggled to repeat the success they found in Stage 1, only winning four of their next fourteen matches before the implementation of an enforced 2-2-2 role lock by the league. The Uprising did not perform well under the new format, as a 0–4 loss to the Atlanta Reign on August 25 gave Boston a winless 0–7 Stage 4 record.

== Preceding offseason ==
=== Player re-signings ===
From August 1 to September 9, 2018, all Overwatch League teams that competed in the 2018 season could choose to extend their team's players' contracts. Uprising released four of their ten players – tied with Los Angeles Gladiators for the most in the league by a playoff team – in Shin "Kalios" Woo-yeol, Connor "Avast" Prince, Mikias "Snow" Yohannes, and Stanislav "Mistakes" Danilov.

=== Free agency ===
Boston's first offseason acquisition was on October 22, when Uprising signed DPS player Jeffrey "blasé" Tsang from Overwatch Contenders team Gladiators Legion. On October 27, it was announced that flex support player Park "Neko" Seh-yeon had been signed to new expansion team Toronto Defiant. The team promoted Kelsey "ColourHex" Birse and Minseob "Axxiom" Park from their academy team Toronto Esports three days later. On November 4, Uprising signed main tank Cameron "Fusions" Bosworth, who had just recently competed in the 2018 Overwatch World Cup for team UK, on a two-way contract with Toronto Esports. On December 3, Uprising transferred Kwon "Striker" Nam-joo to San Francisco Shock. Two day later, the team signed Renan "alemao" Moretto, the first Brazilian player to sign to an Overwatch League roster. The team's final offseason transaction occurred on February 12, two days before the beginning of the regular season, when Uprising transferred main tank Noh "Gamsu" Young-jin to Shanghai Dragons.

== Regular season ==
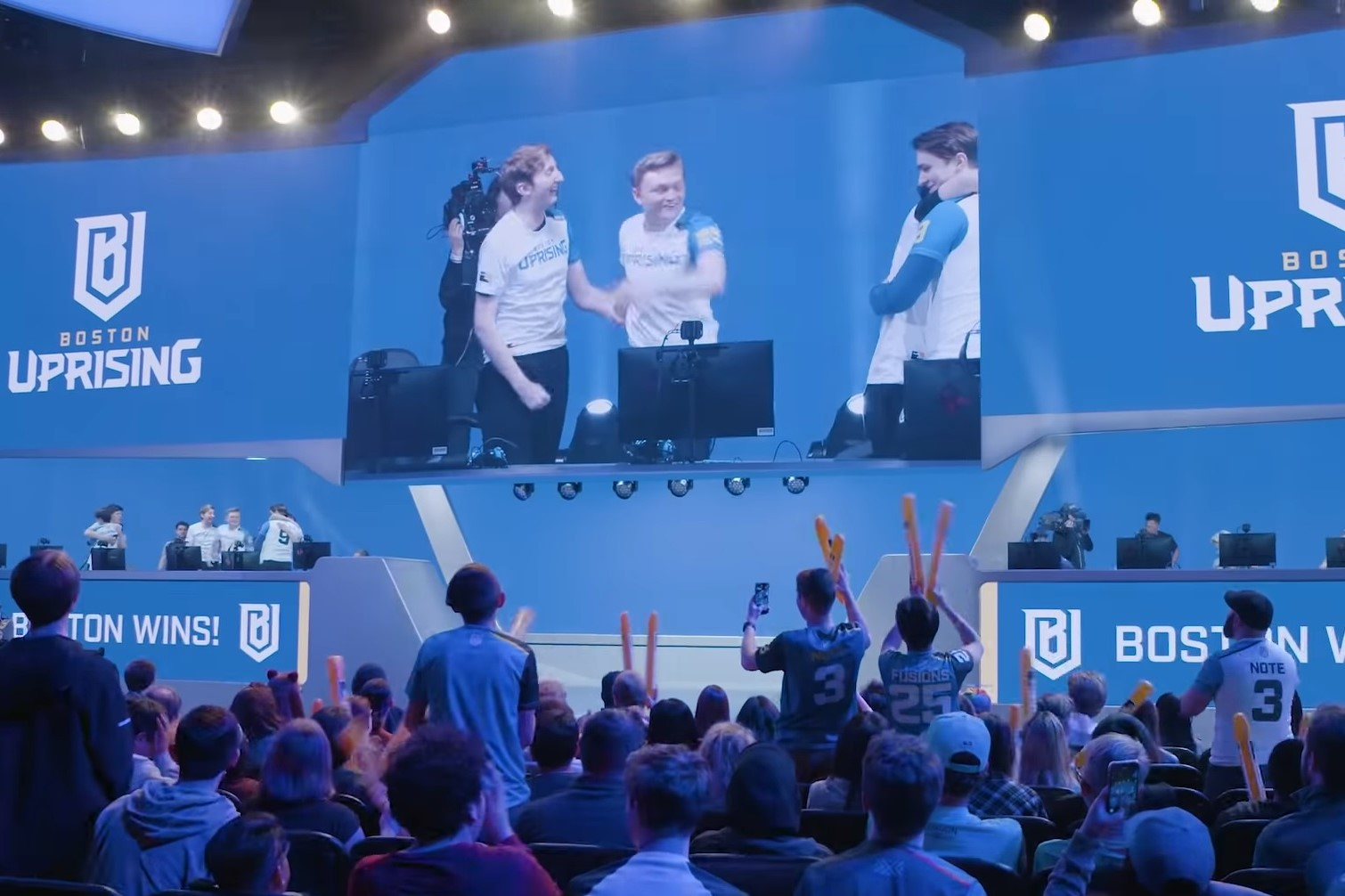
Boston Uprising defeated Dallas Fuel on March 16.

Boston opened their season on February 14 with a match against the New York Excelsior; Boston lost the match 2–1 loss. The Uprising's next match was against the Houston Outlaws three days later. Main tank Cameron "Fusions" Bosworth performed solidly in the match, as the team took a 3–2 victory. The following week, Boston lost to the Shanghai Dragons by a 1–3 score, giving the Dragon's their first-ever franchise victory. Boston clinched the sixth, and final, seed of the Stage 1 Playoffs. The Uprising faced the top-seeded Vancouver Titans in the Stage 1 Quarterfinals on March 21. They did not win a single map against the Titans, losing the match 0–3.

Two days prior to Boston's first match of Stage 2, the Uprising signed support player Zion "Persia" Yang, who had most recently played for Talon Esports of Overwatch Contenders Pacific. On the same day, Boston traded flex tank Lucas "NotE" Meissner to the Dallas Fuel in exchange for flex tank Richard "rCk" Kanerva. Boston failed to claim a Stage 2 playoff berth.

In Stage 3, the Uprising went on a season-high 6-game losing streak, which was snapped on June 23 with a 3–2 win over the Paris Eternal. The team ended Stage 3 with a 1–6 record.

Prior to the start of Stage 4, which would debut the League's enforcement of a 2-2-2 role lock, the Uprising acquired DPS Lee "Stellar" Do-hyung, who had retired earlier in the season, from the Toronto Defiant. The team did not fare well with the new change, losing all seven of their matches in Stage 4.

== Final roster ==
2019 Boston Uprising roster
Players
Coaches

| Role | No. | Handle | Name | Nationality |
|---|---|---|---|---|
| Damage | 17 | Colourhex | Birse, Kelsey | New Zealand |
| Damage | 22 | blasé | Tsang, Jeffrey | United States |
| Damage | 7 | Stellar | Lee Do-hyung | South Korea |
| Tank | 10 | Axxiom | Park Min-seob | South Korea |
| Tank | 25 | Fusions | Bosworth, Cameron | United Kingdom |
| Tank | 34 | rCk | Kanerva, Richard | Finland |
| Support | 9 | Kellex | Keller, Kristian | Denmark |
| Support | 14 | alemao | Moretto, Renan | Brazil |
| Support | 21 | Persia | Yang Zi-on | South Korea |
| Support | 31 | AimGod | Kwon Min-Seok | South Korea |

Head coach

- Vacant

Legend:
- (I) Inactive
- (S) Suspended
- (2W) Two-way player
- Substitute
- (injured) Injury / Illness

Latest roster transaction: July 15, 2019.

=== Transactions ===
Transactions of/for players on the roster during the 2019 regular season:

- On April 2, Uprising signed Yang "Persia" Zi-on.
- On April 2, Uprising traded Richard "rCk" Kanerva to Dallas Fuel in exchange for Lucas "NotE" Meissner.
- On July 15, Uprising acquired Lee "Stellar" Do-hyung from Toronto Defiant.

== Standings ==
=== Record by stage ===
| Stage | Pld | W | L | Pct | MW | ML | MT | MD | Pos |
|---|---|---|---|---|---|---|---|---|---|
| 1 | 7 | 4 | 3 | .571 | 16 | 13 | 1 | +3 | 8 |
| 2 | 7 | 3 | 4 | .429 | 13 | 19 | 0 | -6 | 13 |
| 3 | 7 | 1 | 6 | .143 | 7 | 22 | 1 | -15 | 16 |
| 4 (Note: No stage playoffs were held for Stage 4.) | 7 | 0 | 7 | .000 | 5 | 24 | 0 | -19 | 20 |
| Overall | 28 | 8 | 20 | .286 | 41 | 78 | 2 | -37 | 19 |
Qualified for playoffs • Qualified for play-in tournament

=== League ===
| Pos | Div | Team | Pld | W | L | PCT | MW | ML | MT | MD | Qualification |
|---|---|---|---|---|---|---|---|---|---|---|---|
| 1 | PAC | Vancouver Titans | 28 | 25 | 3 | 0.893 | 89 | 28 | 0 | +61 | Advance to season playoffs (division leaders) |
| 2 | ATL | New York Excelsior | 28 | 22 | 6 | 0.786 | 78 | 38 | 3 | +40 | Advance to season playoffs (division leaders) |
| 3 | PAC | San Francisco Shock | 28 | 23 | 5 | 0.821 | 92 | 26 | 0 | +66 | Advance to season playoffs |
| 4 | PAC | Hangzhou Spark | 28 | 18 | 10 | 0.643 | 64 | 52 | 4 | +12 | Advance to season playoffs |
| 5 | PAC | Los Angeles Gladiators | 28 | 17 | 11 | 0.607 | 67 | 48 | 3 | +19 | Advance to season playoffs |
| 6 | ATL | Atlanta Reign | 28 | 16 | 12 | 0.571 | 69 | 50 | 1 | +19 | Advance to season playoffs |
| 7 | ATL | London Spitfire | 28 | 16 | 12 | 0.571 | 58 | 52 | 6 | +6 | Advance to play-ins |
| 8 | PAC | Seoul Dynasty | 28 | 15 | 13 | 0.536 | 64 | 50 | 3 | +14 | Advance to play-ins |
| 9 | PAC | Guangzhou Charge | 28 | 15 | 13 | 0.536 | 61 | 57 | 1 | +4 | Advance to play-ins |
| 10 | ATL | Philadelphia Fusion | 28 | 15 | 13 | 0.536 | 57 | 60 | 3 | −3 | Advance to play-ins |
| 11 | PAC | Shanghai Dragons | 28 | 13 | 15 | 0.464 | 51 | 61 | 3 | −10 | Advance to play-ins |
| 12 | PAC | Chengdu Hunters | 28 | 13 | 15 | 0.464 | 55 | 66 | 1 | −11 | Advance to play-ins |
| 13 | PAC | Los Angeles Valiant | 28 | 12 | 16 | 0.429 | 56 | 61 | 4 | −5 | |
| 14 | ATL | Paris Eternal | 28 | 11 | 17 | 0.393 | 46 | 67 | 3 | −21 | |
| 15 | PAC | Dallas Fuel | 28 | 10 | 18 | 0.357 | 43 | 70 | 3 | −27 | |
| 16 | ATL | Houston Outlaws | 28 | 9 | 19 | 0.321 | 47 | 69 | 3 | −22 | |
| 17 | ATL | Toronto Defiant | 28 | 8 | 20 | 0.286 | 39 | 72 | 4 | −33 | |
| 18 | ATL | Washington Justice | 28 | 8 | 20 | 0.286 | 39 | 72 | 6 | −33 | |
| 19 | ATL | Boston Uprising | 28 | 8 | 20 | 0.286 | 41 | 78 | 2 | −37 | |
| 20 | ATL | Florida Mayhem | 28 | 6 | 22 | 0.214 | 36 | 75 | 5 | −39 | |

Source: The Overwatch League
Rules for classification: 1) winning percentage; 2) map differential; 3) head-to-head record; 4) head-to-head map differential

== Game log ==
=== Regular season ===
2019 game log (Regular season record: 8–20)
Stage 1 (4–3)

| 1 | February 14 | New York Excelsior | 2 | – | 1 | Boston Uprising | Burbank, CA |
| | | Recap | | | | | Blizzard Arena |
| | | 2 | Nepal | | | 0 | |
| | | 3 | Numbani | | | 4 | |
| | | 4 | Horizon Lunar Colony | | | 4 | |
| | | 3 | Route 66 | | | 2 | |

| 2 | February 17 | Houston Outlaws | 2 | – | 3 | Boston Uprising | Burbank, CA |
| | | Recap | | | | | Blizzard Arena |
| | | 2 | Nepal | | | 0 | |
| | | 2 | Hollywood | | | 3 | |
| | | 3 | Volskaya Industries | | | 4 | |
| | | 4 | Dorado | | | 3 | |
| | | 1 | Ilios | | | 2 | |

| 3 | February 22 | Shanghai Dragons | 3 | – | 1 | Boston Uprising | Burbank, CA |
| | | Recap | | | | | Blizzard Arena |
| | | 2 | Ilios | | | 0 | |
| | | 4 | King's Row | | | 3 | |
| | | 5 | Horizon Lunar Colony | | | 4 | |
| | | 0 | Rialto | | | 1 | |

| 4 | February 28 | Seoul Dynasty | 1 | – | 3 | Boston Uprising | Burbank, CA |
| | | Recap | | | | | Blizzard Arena |
| | | 1 | Nepal | | | 2 | |
| | | 4 | Numbani | | | 5 | |
| | | 4 | Temple of Anubis | | | 3 | |
| | | 2 | Route 66 | | | 3 | |

| 5 | March 03 | Boston Uprising | 1 | – | 3 | Toronto Defiant | Burbank, CA |
| | | Recap | | | | | Blizzard Arena |
| | | 0 | Busan | | | 2 | |
| | | 2 | Hollywood | | | 3 | |
| | | 4 | Temple of Anubis | | | 2 | |
| | | 1 | Rialto | | | 2 | |

| 6 | March 10 | Florida Mayhem | 0 | – | 4 | Boston Uprising | Burbank, CA |
| | | Recap | | | | | Blizzard Arena |
| | | 0 | Busan | | | 2 | |
| | | 2 | Numbani | | | 3 | |
| | | 4 | Horizon Lunar Colony | | | 5 | |
| | | 1 | Dorado | | | 2 | |

| 7 | March 16 | Boston Uprising | 3 | – | 2 | Dallas Fuel | Burbank, CA |
| | | Recap | | | | | Blizzard Arena |
| | | 1 | Ilios | | | 2 | |
| | | 2 | King's Row | | | 3 | |
| | | 4 | Volskaya Industries | | | 3 | |
| | | 3 | Dorado | | | 0 | |
| | | 2 | Nepal | | | 1 | |

Stage 1 Playoffs

| Quarterfinals | March 21 | Boston Uprising | 0 | – | 3 | Vancouver Titans | Burbank, CA |
| | 8:00 pm PST | Recap | | | | | Blizzard Arena |
| | | 0 | Ilios | | | 2 | |
| | | 1 | King's Row | | | 2 | |
| | | 1 | Temple of Anubis | | | 2 | |

Stage 2 (3–4)

| 8 | April 04 | Boston Uprising | 3 | – | 2 | Atlanta Reign | Burbank, CA |
| | 5:25 pm PST | Recap | | | | | Blizzard Arena |
| | | 1 | Lijang Tower | | | 2 | |
| | | 1 | Temple of Anubis | | | 2 | |
| | | 3 | Eichenwalde | | | 2 | |
| | | 4 | Watchpoint: Gibraltar | | | 3 | |
| | | 3 | Busan | | | 2 | |

| 9 | April 06 | Toronto Defiant | 2 | – | 3 | Boston Uprising | Burbank, CA |
| | 1:45 pm PST | Recap | | | | | Blizzard Arena |
| | | 2 | Busan | | | 0 | |
| | | 4 | Hanamura | | | 3 | |
| | | 1 | Eichenwalde | | | 3 | |
| | | 0 | Rialto | | | 1 | |
| | | 1 | Oasis | | | 2 | |

| 10 | April 12 | Boston Uprising | 2 | – | 3 | Hangzhou Spark | Burbank, CA |
| | 5:30 pm PST | Recap | | | | | Blizzard Arena |
| | | 1 | Oasis | | | 2 | |
| | | 3 | Temple of Anubis | | | 2 | |
| | | 4 | Blizzard World | | | 3 | |
| | | 0 | Junkertown | | | 1 | |
| | | 1 | Lijang Tower | | | 2 | |

| 11 | April 20 | London Spitfire | 4 | – | 0 | Boston Uprising | Burbank, CA |
| | 12:00 noon PST | Recap | | | | | Blizzard Arena |
| | | 2 | Busan | | | 0 | |
| | | 3 | Paris | | | 2 | |
| | | 6 | King's Row | | | 5 | |
| | | 2 | Junkertown | | | 0 | |

| 12 | April 21 | Vancouver Titans | 4 | – | 0 | Boston Uprising | Burbank, CA |
| | 12:00 noon PST | Recap | | | | | Blizzard Arena |
| | | 2 | Lijiang Tower | | | 0 | |
| | | 3 | Paris | | | 2 | |
| | | 3 | King's Row | | | 2 | |
| | | 5 | Watchpoint: Gibraltar | | | 3 | |

| 13 | May 03 | Boston Uprising | 3 | – | 1 | Los Angeles Gladiators | Burbank, CA |
| | 5:30 pm PST | Recap | | | | | Blizzard Arena |
| | | 2 | Oasis | | | 1 | |
| | | 2 | Hanamura | | | 1 | |
| | | 2 | Blizzard World | | | 3 | |
| | | 3 | Rialto | | | 2 | |

| 14 | May 05 | Washington Justice | 3 | – | 2 | Boston Uprising | Burbank, CA |
| | 1:30 pm PST | Details | | | | | Blizzard Arena |
| | | 0 | Lijiang Tower | | | 2 | |
| | | 0 | Temple of Anubis | | | 2 | |
| | | 2 | Blizzard World | | | 1 | |
| | | 4 | Rialto | | | 3 | |
| | | 2 | Busan | | | 1 | |

Stage 3 (1–6)

| 15 | June 07 | Boston Uprising | 0 | – | 4 | London Spitfire | Burbank, CA |
| | 5:45 pm PST | Details | | | | | Blizzard Arena |
| | | 0 | Oasis | | | 2 | |
| | | 0 | Horizon Lunar Colony | | | 1 | |
| | | 1 | Eichenwalde | | | 2 | |
| | | 1 | Dorado | | | 2 | |

| 16 | June 09 | Paris Eternal | 3 | – | 1 | Boston Uprising | Burbank, CA |
| | 1:45 pm PST | Details | | | | | Blizzard Arena |
| | | 0 | Ilios | | | 2 | |
| | | 5 | Paris | | | 4 | |
| | | 3 | Eichenwalde | | | 2 | |
| | | 4 | Watchpoint: Gibraltar | | | 3 | |

| 17 | June 14 | Boston Uprising | 0 | – | 4 | Houston Outlaws | Burbank, CA |
| | 7:30 pm PST | Details | | | | | Blizzard Arena |
| | | 0 | Nepal | | | 2 | |
| | | 1 | Volskaya Industries | | | 2 | |
| | | 1 | Numbani | | | 2 | |
| | | 0 | Havana | | | 1 | |

| 18 | June 16 | Philadelphia Fusion | 2 | – | 1 | Boston Uprising | Burbank, CA |
| | 3:30 pm PST | Details | | | | | Blizzard Arena |
| | | 0 | Ilios | | | 2 | |
| | | 4 | Paris | | | 4 | |
| | | 1 | Hollywood | | | 0 | |
| | | 1 | Watchpoint: Gibraltar | | | 0 | |

| 19 | June 20 | San Francisco Shock | 4 | – | 0 | Boston Uprising | Burbank, CA |
| | 4:00 pm PST | Details | | | | | Blizzard Arena |
| | | 2 | Oasis | | | 0 | |
| | | 3 | Paris | | | 2 | |
| | | 2 | Hollywood | | | 1 | |
| | | 1 | Dorado | | | 0 | |

| 20 | June 23 | Boston Uprising | 3 | – | 2 | Paris Eternal | Burbank, CA |
| | 1:45 pm PST | Details | | | | | Blizzard Arena |
| | | 0 | Oasis | | | 2 | |
| | | 1 | Volskaya Industries | | | 2 | |
| | | 5 | Eichenwalde | | | 4 | |
| | | 3 | Dorado | | | 2 | |
| | | 2 | Nepal | | | 0 | |

| 21 | June 29 | Boston Uprising | 2 | – | 3 | Philadelphia Fusion | Burbank, CA |
| | 1:45 pm PST | Details | | | | | Blizzard Arena |
| | | 0 | Nepal | | | 2 | |
| | | 2 | Horizon Lunar Colony | | | 1 | |
| | | 0 | Numbani | | | 1 | |
| | | 2 | Havana | | | 1 | |
| | | 1 | Ilios | | | 2 | |

Stage 4 (0–7)

| 22 | July 27 | Boston Uprising | 0 | – | 4 | Guangzhou Charge | Burbank, CA |
| | 1:45 pm PST | Details | | | | | Blizzard Arena |
| | | 0 | Busan | | | 2 | |
| | | 1 | Temple of Anubis | | | 2 | |
| | | 1 | Hollywood | | | 2 | |
| | | 4 | Havana | | | 5 | |

| 23 | July 28 | Boston Uprising | 2 | – | 3 | Chengdu Hunters | Burbank, CA |
| | 5:15 pm PST | Details | | | | | Blizzard Arena |
| | | 1 | Busan | | | 2 | |
| | | 3 | Volskaya Industries | | | 2 | |
| | | 0 | Blizzard World | | | 3 | |
| | | 2 | Havana | | | 0 | |
| | | 0 | Ilios | | | 2 | |

| 24 | August 09 | Boston Uprising | 1 | – | 3 | Washington Justice | Burbank, CA |
| | 4:00 pm PST | Details | | | | | Blizzard Arena |
| | | 1 | Lijiang Tower | | | 2 | |
| | | 1 | Temple of Anubis | | | 2 | |
| | | 2 | Blizzard World | | | 1 | |
| | | 1 | Route 66 | | | 2 | |

| 25 | August 15 | Boston Uprising | 0 | – | 4 | Florida Mayhem | Burbank, CA |
| | 4:00 pm PST | Details | | | | | Blizzard Arena |
| | | 0 | Ilios | | | 2 | |
| | | 2 | Hanamura | | | 3 | |
| | | 1 | Hollywood | | | 2 | |
| | | 0 | Route 66 | | | 1 | |

| 26 | August 17 | Los Angeles Valiant | 3 | – | 1 | Boston Uprising | Burbank, CA |
| | 1:45 pm PST | Details | | | | | Blizzard Arena |
| | | 2 | Busan | | | 0 | |
| | | 2 | Hanamura | | | 1 | |
| | | 2 | King's Row | | | 3 | |
| | | 5 | Havana | | | 4 | |

| 27 | August 24 | Boston Uprising | 1 | – | 3 | New York Excelsior | Los Angeles, CA |
| | 3:45 pm PST | Details | | | | | The Novo |
| | | 1 | Ilios | | | 2 | |
| | | 0 | Hanamura | | | 1 | |
| | | 3 | King's Row | | | 2 | |
| | | 2 | Junkertown | | | 3 | |

| 28 | August 25 | Atlanta Reign | 4 | – | 0 | Boston Uprising | Los Angeles, CA |
| | 1:45 pm PST | Details | | | | | The Novo |
| | | 2 | Lijiang Tower | | | 0 | |
| | | 2 | Volskaya Industries | | | 1 | |
| | | 3 | King's Row | | | 2 | |
| | | 3 | Junkertown | | | 2 | |

== Awards ==
On May 1, Cameron "Fusions" Bosworth was named as a starter for the 2019 Overwatch League All-Star Game.
