= 2019 Houston Outlaws season =

- Head coach: Tae-yeong Kim
- General manager: Matt Rodriguez
- Owner: Hector Rodriguez (until Jun 12); Immortals Gaming Club
- Division: Atlantic

Results
- Record: 9–19 (.321)
- Place: Atlantic: 6th; League: 16th
- Stage 1 Playoffs: Did not qualify
- Stage 2 Playoffs: Did not qualify
- Stage 3 Playoffs: Quarterfinals
- Season Playoffs: Did not qualify
- Total Earnings: $25,000

The 2019 Houston Outlaws season was the second season of the Houston Outlaws's existence in the Overwatch League (OWL) and their second under head coach Tae-yeong Kim. After finishing 22–18 the previous season, the Outlaws were looking to improve on their record and qualify for the season playoffs for the first time.

The Outlaws began the season winning three of their matches in Stage 1. The stage was capped off by a 1–3 loss to the Atlanta Reign that prevented Houston from qualifying for the Stage 1 Playoffs. Houston performed poorly in Stage 2, as the team did not claim a single victory in their seven matches of the stage. After the All-Star break, the Outlaws hit their stride, posting a 5–2 record in Stage 3 and qualifying for the Stage 3 Playoffs. However, lost to the Vancouver Titans 0–3 in the quarterfinals. A 1–3 loss to the London Spitfire in Week 3 of Stage 4 officially eliminated the Outlaws from season playoff contention. Houston ended the season on a 5-game losing streak to finish the season with a disappointing 9–19 record.

== Preceding offseason ==
=== Player re-signings ===
From August 1 to September 9, 2018, all Overwatch League teams that competed in the 2018 season could choose to extend their team's players' contracts. Outlaws elected to release three of its players, Russell "FCTFCTN" Campbell, Lucas "Mendokusaii" Håkansson, and Matthew "Clockwork" Dias; Mendokusaii and Clockwork were moved to non-player roles with the team.

=== Free agency ===
All non-expansion teams could not enter the free agency period until October 8; they were able to sign members from their respective academy team and make trades until then. On September 18, Outlaws traded GG Esports Academy player Yoo "Smurf" Myeong-hwan to San Francisco Shock in exchange for Dante "Danteh" Cruz.

== Regular season ==
The Outlaws opened their 2019 season with a match against the new expansion franchise Toronto Defiant on February 15; the Outlaws lost 2–3. Houston finished Stage 1 with a 3–4 record and did not qualify for the stage playoffs.

In Stage 2, the Outlaws faced their in-state rivals, the Dallas Fuel. Houston, who had never lost to Dallas, lost the match 1–3. The Outlaws ended the stage with a winless 0–7 record.

In Stage 3, Houston found themselves in an eight-game losing streak; however, a win over the San Francisco Shock snapped both Houston's losing streak and San Francisco's eleven-game winning streak. The Outlaws, who had a winless Stage 2, finished Stage 3 with a 5–2 record and secured a spot in the Stage 3 Playoffs. The Outlaws faced the second-seeded Vancouver Titans in the Stage 3 Quarterfinals on July 11; Houston was unable secure a map win and lost the match 0–3.

The Outlaws were officially eliminated from playoff contention after a loss to the London Spitfire on August 10.

== Sale of the franchise ==
On June 12, Immortals Gaming Club (IGC), the parent company of Immortals and Los Angeles Valiant, acquired Infinite Esports, the parent company of Houston Outlaws and OpTic Gaming, marking the first major sale of any Overwatch League franchise. By OWL rules, one company may not own more than one OWL franchise. Both Riot Games and Activision Blizzard approved the sale, but IGC must operate Valiant and Outlaws as entirely separate entities, with oversight by OWL representatives, until IGC sell the Outlaws.

== Final roster ==
2019 Houston Outlaws roster
Players
Coaches

Role	No.	Handle	Name	Nationality
Damage	6	Danteh	Cruz, Dante	United States
Damage	49	LiNkzr	Masalin, Jiri	Finland
Damage	57	ArHaN	Jung Won-hyeop	South Korea
Damage	76	JAKE	Lyon, Jacob	United States
Tank	7	SPREE	Vanhomwegen, Alexandre	Belgium
Tank	17	Muma	Wilmot, Austin	United States
Tank	69	Coolmatt	Iorio, Matt	United States
Support	1	Rawkus	Flaherty, Shane	United States
Support	3	Bani	Benell, Christopher	Canada
Support	13	Boink	Pence, Daniel	United States

Head coach

- Kim Tae-yeong

Legend:
- (I) Inactive
- (S) Suspended
- (2W) Two-way player
- Substitute
- (injured) Injury / Illness

Latest roster transaction: September 18, 2018.

== Standings ==
=== Record by stage ===
Stage	Pld	W	L	Pct	MW	ML	MT	MD	Pos
1	7	3	4	.429	13	16	1	-3	12
2	7	0	7	.000	4	24	1	-20	20
3	7	5	2	.714	19	10	1	+9	7
4 (Note: No stage playoffs were held for Stage 4.)	7	1	6	.143	11	19	0	-8	16
Overall	28	9	19	.321	47	69	3	-22	16
Qualified for playoffs • Qualified for play-in tournament

=== League ===
Pos	Div	Team	Pld	W	L	PCT	MW	ML	MT	MD	Qualification
1	PAC	Vancouver Titans	28	25	3	0.893	89	28	0	+61	Advance to season playoffs (division leaders)
2	ATL	New York Excelsior	28	22	6	0.786	78	38	3	+40	Advance to season playoffs (division leaders)
3	PAC	San Francisco Shock	28	23	5	0.821	92	26	0	+66	Advance to season playoffs
4	PAC	Hangzhou Spark	28	18	10	0.643	64	52	4	+12	Advance to season playoffs
5	PAC	Los Angeles Gladiators	28	17	11	0.607	67	48	3	+19	Advance to season playoffs
6	ATL	Atlanta Reign	28	16	12	0.571	69	50	1	+19	Advance to season playoffs
7	ATL	London Spitfire	28	16	12	0.571	58	52	6	+6	Advance to play-ins
8	PAC	Seoul Dynasty	28	15	13	0.536	64	50	3	+14	Advance to play-ins
9	PAC	Guangzhou Charge	28	15	13	0.536	61	57	1	+4	Advance to play-ins
10	ATL	Philadelphia Fusion	28	15	13	0.536	57	60	3	−3	Advance to play-ins
11	PAC	Shanghai Dragons	28	13	15	0.464	51	61	3	−10	Advance to play-ins
12	PAC	Chengdu Hunters	28	13	15	0.464	55	66	1	−11	Advance to play-ins
13	PAC	Los Angeles Valiant	28	12	16	0.429	56	61	4	−5	
14	ATL	Paris Eternal	28	11	17	0.393	46	67	3	−21	
15	PAC	Dallas Fuel	28	10	18	0.357	43	70	3	−27	
16	ATL	Houston Outlaws	28	9	19	0.321	47	69	3	−22	
17	ATL	Toronto Defiant	28	8	20	0.286	39	72	4	−33	
18	ATL	Washington Justice	28	8	20	0.286	39	72	6	−33	
19	ATL	Boston Uprising	28	8	20	0.286	41	78	2	−37	
20	ATL	Florida Mayhem	28	6	22	0.214	36	75	5	−39	

Source: The Overwatch League
Rules for classification: 1) winning percentage; 2) map differential; 3) head-to-head record; 4) head-to-head map differential

== Game log ==
=== Regular season ===
2019 game log (Regular season record: 9–19)
Stage 1 (3–4)

1	February 15	Toronto Defiant	3	–	2	Houston Outlaws	Burbank, CA
		Recap					Blizzard Arena
		1	Nepal			2	
		4	Numbani			5	
		1	Volskaya Industries			0	
		2	Route 66			1	
		2	Busan			1	

2	February 17	Houston Outlaws	2	–	3	Boston Uprising	Burbank, CA
		Recap					Blizzard Arena
		2	Nepal			0	
		2	Hollywood			3	
		3	Volskaya Industries			4	
		4	Dorado			3	
		1	Ilios			2	

3	February 23	Houston Outlaws	3	–	1	Hangzhou Spark	Burbank, CA
		Recap					Blizzard Arena
		2	Busan			0	
		5	King's Row			4	
		4	Temple of Anubis			3	
		0	Dorado			1	

4	February 24	New York Excelsior	4	–	0	Houston Outlaws	Burbank, CA
		Recap					Blizzard Arena
		2	Nepal			0	
		3	Hollywood			0	
		2	Temple of Anubis			0	
		2	Route 66			1	

5	March 02	Florida Mayhem	1	–	3	Houston Outlaws	Burbank, CA
		Recap					Blizzard Arena
		1	Ilios			2	
		3	King's Row			5	
		3	Horizon Lunar Colony			4	
		2	Rialto			1	

6	March 09	Los Angeles Valiant	1	–	2	Houston Outlaws	Burbank, CA
		Recap					Blizzard Arena
		1	Busan			2	
		3	Numbani			2	
		3	Volskaya Industries			3	
		0	Route 66			2	

7	March 17	Houston Outlaws	1	–	3	Atlanta Reign	Burbank, CA
		Recap					Blizzard Arena
		1	Ilios			2	
		2	King's Row			1	
		0	Horizon Lunar Colony			1	
		2	Rialto			3	

Stage 2 (0–7)

8	April 13	Vancouver Titans	3	–	1	Houston Outlaws	Burbank, CA
	1:30 pm PST	Recap					Blizzard Arena
		0	Busan			2	
		1	Paris			0	
		2	Eichenwalde			1	
		1	Rialto			0	

9	April 19	Philadelphia Fusion	4	–	0	Houston Outlaws	Burbank, CA
	5:30 pm PST	Recap					Blizzard Arena
		2	Busan			1	
		3	Temple of Anubis			2	
		2	Eichenwalde			0	
		3	Watchpoint: Gibraltar			0	

10	April 21	Houston Outlaws	0	–	3	Shanghai Dragons	Burbank, CA
	1:30 pm PST	Recap					Blizzard Arena
		0	Oasis			2	
		0	Temple of Anubis			0	
		0	Blizzard World			1	
		2	Junkertown			3	

11	April 27	Houston Outlaws	0	–	4	Seoul Dynasty	Allen, TX
	1:10 pm PST	Recap					Allen Event Center
		1	Oasis			2	
		3	Paris			4	
		0	Blizzard World			3	
		3	Rialto			4	

12	April 28	Houston Outlaws	1	–	3	Dallas Fuel	Allen, TX
	4:15 pm PST	Recap					Allen Event Center
		0	Lijiang Tower			2	
		2	Temple of Anubis			1	
		2	King's Row			3	
		3	Watchpoint: Gibraltar			4	

13	May 02	Guangzhou Charge	3	–	2	Houston Outlaws	Burbank, CA
	8:30 pm PST	Recap					Blizzard Arena
		2	Lijiang Tower			1	
		2	Hanamura			0	
		1	King's Row			2	
		2	Rialto			3	
		2	Busan			0	

14	May 04	London Spitfire	4	–	0	Houston Outlaws	Burbank, CA
	12:00 noon PST	Recap					Blizzard Arena
		2	Lijiang Tower			0	
		2	Hanamura			0	
		3	King's Row			2	
		2	Junkertown			0	

Stage 3 (5–2)

15	June 07	Houston Outlaws	2	–	3	New York Excelsior	Burbank, CA
	7:30 pm PST	Details					Blizzard Arena
		2	Ilios			1	
		0	Horizon Lunar Colony			1	
		4	Numbani			3	
		3	Watchpoint: Gibraltar			4	
		0	Oasis			2	

16	June 13	Houston Outlaws	3	–	2	San Francisco Shock	Burbank, CA
	4:00 pm PST	Details					Blizzard Arena
		2	Nepal			1	
		0	Horizon Lunar Colony			1	
		0	Eichenwalde			3	
		1	Havana			0	
		2	Ilios			0	

17	June 14	Boston Uprising	0	–	4	Houston Outlaws	Burbank, CA
	7:30 pm PST	Details					Blizzard Arena
		0	Nepal			2	
		1	Volskaya Industries			2	
		1	Numbani			2	
		0	Havana			1	

18	June 20	Paris Eternal	1	–	3	Houston Outlaws	Burbank, CA
	5:45 pm PST	Details					Blizzard Arena
		0	Oasis			2	
		2	Paris			4	
		2	Hollywood			1	
		1	Dorado			2	

19	June 23	Houston Outlaws	1	–	3	Florida Mayhem	Burbank, CA
	3:30 pm PST	Details					Blizzard Arena
		2	Ilios			0	
		2	Paris			3	
		2	Hollywood			3	
		2	Watchpoint: Gibraltar			3	

20	June 28	Houston Outlaws	3	–	0	Washington Justice	Burbank, CA
	9:00 pm PST	Details					Blizzard Arena
		2	Oasis			0	
		4	Volskaya Industries			4	
		3	Eichenwalde			2	
		1	Dorado			0	

21	June 30	Houston Outlaws	3	–	1	Toronto Defiant	Burbank, CA
	3:30 pm PST	Details					Blizzard Arena
		0	Oasis			2	
		3	Horizon Lunar Colony			2	
		2	Eichenwalde			1	
		3	Dorado			1	

Stage 3 Playoffs

Quarterfinals	July 11	Houston Outlaws	0	–	3	Vancouver Titans	Burbank, CA
	6:00 pm PST	Details					Blizzard Arena
		0	Ilios			2	
		2	Eichenwalde			3	
		2	Volskaya Industries			3	

Stage 4 (1–6)

22	July 25	Houston Outlaws	1	–	3	Paris Eternal	Burbank, CA
	4:00 pm PST	Details					Blizzard Arena
		2	Busan			0	
		0	Volskaya Industries			1	
		0	Blizzard World			3	
		2	Junkertown			3	

23	July 27	Los Angeles Gladiators	1	–	3	Houston Outlaws	Burbank, CA
	3:30 pm PST	Details					Blizzard Arena
		1	Busan			2	
		2	Hanamura			3	
		2	Hollywood			1	
		2	Havana			3	

24	August 02	Houston Outlaws	1	–	3	Philadelphia Fusion	Burbank, CA
	5:45 pm PST	Details					Blizzard Arena
		0	Ilios			2	
		2	Temple of Anubis			1	
		1	Hollywood			2	
		3	Havana			6	

25	August 04	Atlanta Reign	3	–	1	Houston Outlaws	Burbank, CA
	12:00 noon PST	Details					Blizzard Arena
		2	Lijiang Tower			0	
		2	Hanamura			3	
		1	Blizzard World			0	
		3	Route 66			2	

26	August 10	Houston Outlaws	1	–	3	London Spitfire	Burbank, CA
	12:00 noon PST	Details					Blizzard Arena
		0	Lijiang Tower			2	
		3	Volskaya Industries			4	
		2	King's Row			3	
		1	Route 66			0	

27	August 11	Washington Justice	3	–	2	Houston Outlaws	Burbank, CA
	1:45 pm PST	Details					Blizzard Arena
		1	Lijiang Tower			2	
		2	Hanamura			1	
		1	King's Row			2	
		3	Route 66			2	
		2	Busan			1	

28	August 17	Chengdu Hunters	3	–	2	Houston Outlaws	Burbank, CA
	5:15 pm PST	Details					Blizzard Arena
		1	Ilios			2	
		2	Temple of Anubis			1	
		2	Hollywood			1	
		2	Junkertown			3	
		2	Lijiang Tower			1	

== Awards ==
On May 8, Dante "Danteh" Cruz was named as a reserve for the 2019 Overwatch League All-Star Game.
