= 2019 Florida Mayhem season =

- Head coach: Vytis Lasaitis (rel. Apr 4); Oh Nam-hun (rel. Aug)
- General manager: Matt Akhavan
- Owner: Ben Spoont
- Division: Atlantic

Results
- Record: 6–22 (.214)
- Place: Atlantic: 10th; League: 20th
- Stage 1 Playoffs: Did not qualify
- Stage 2 Playoffs: Did not qualify
- Stage 3 Playoffs: Did not qualify
- Season Playoffs: Did not qualify

The 2019 Florida Mayhem season was the second season of the Florida Mayhem's existence in the Overwatch League and the team's second season under head coach Vytis "Mineral" Lasaitis.

The Mayhem looked to improve from their 2018 campaign, when they only amassed seven wins. After finishing Stage 1 with only one win, the Mayhem announced their intention to implement an all-Korean team and fired two coaches, including head coach Mineral. The team's struggles continued in Stage 2, as they did not win a single match. Prior to Stage 3, the Mayhem's all-Korean overhaul continued, as they made several roster changes. Florida hired Oh "Unread" Nam-hun amidst a one-win Stage 3 as the team's new head coach. The Mayhem found success in Stage 4, when the league implemented a 2-2-2 role lock, as they were able to win four of their final five matches.

== Preceding offseason ==
=== Player re-signings ===
From August 1 to September 9, 2018, all Overwatch League teams that competed in the 2018 season could choose to extend their team's players' contracts. After a disappointing season, Mayhem retained three of their nine players, releasing Andreas "Logix" Berghmans, Tim "Manneten" Bylund, Johan "CWoosH" Klingestedt, Sebastian "Zebbosai" Olsson, Aleksi "Zuppeh" Kuntsi, and Joonas "zappis" Alakurtti.

=== Free agency ===
All non-expansion teams could not enter the free agency period until October 8; they were able to sign members from their respective academy team and make trades until then. On September 11, when Mayhem acquired Koo "xepheR" Jae-mo from Seoul Dynasty. Mayhem promoted HyeonWoo "HaGoPeun" Jo and Damon "Apply" Conti from Mayhem Academy on September 21 and 24, respectively.

Florida made three free agency signings on October 15, signing Junsu "Kris" Choe, Sangbum "bqb" Lee, and Sangwon "SWoN" Yoon.

== Regular season ==
The Mayhem opened their season on February 15 with a match against the Atlanta Reign; Florida was swept 0–4 in the match. The following week, Mayhem announced the signing of flex tank Caleb "McGravy" McGarvey. Florida struggles throughout the stage, finishing with a 1–6 record.

One day prior to their first match of Stage 2, Florida announced its plan to implement an all-Korean roster, citing that there were "multiple issues with communication and overall team synergy, in part due to the lack of a common language among players and coaching staff." As such, Mayhem released head coach Vytis "Mineral" Lasaitis and assistant coach Jung "Yeah" Young-su; additionally, all non-Korean players (Kevyn "TviQ" Lindström, Damon "Apply" Conti, and Caleb "McGravy" McGarvey) were inactive for the entirety of Stage 2. The team did not perform well in Stage 2, losing all seven of their matches. After the end of Stage 2, Mayhem made several roster moves. Mayhem traded Caleb "Mcgravy" McGarvy and Mayhem Academy players Russell "FCTFCTN" Campbell and Johannes "Shax" Nielsen to Los Angeles Valiant in exchange for Koo "Fate" Pan-seung on May 10, signed Lee "Byrem" Seong-ju on May 13, released Damon "Apply" Conti on May 29, and released Kevyn "TviQ" Lindström and Kim "SNT" Sung-hoon on June 2.

In Stage 3, Florida's all-Korean roster overhaul continued. The team signed support Park "RaiN" Jae-ho from Overwatch Contenders team O2 Blast on June 17, and two days later, they signed three players from Korean Contenders team Armament Esports: off-tank Lee "Gargoyle" Beom-jun, flex DPS Choi "DPI" Yong-joon, and main tank Choi "Karayan" San-ha. Additionally, the team signed three staff members: head coach Oh "Unread" Nam-hun, assistant coach Kim "KH1" Hyung-il, and analyst Daumantas "RyuuTsubasa" Krugliakovas. Florida defeated the Houston Outlaws, 3–1, in the third week of Stage 3 to claim their second win of the season and snapped their 15-game losing streak. Looking to carry that momentum into week four, Florida took on the Hangzhou Spark on June 29. The match saw the debut of Florida's Gargoyle and DPI, but the team was ultimately swept 0–4 by the Spark, who set the record for the fastest completion of Eichenwalde at 4 minutes and 12 seconds in the process. The team ended Stage 3 with a 1–6 record.

Although not announced at the time, the team mutually parted ways with head coach Unread at some point in Stage 4. The Mayhem's first match of Stage 4, along with the first match with an enforced 2-2-2 role lock by the League, was against the Vancouver Titans on July 28, and were swept 0–4. The loss marked the fourth match in a row in which Mayhem had failed to secure a map win. Florida defeated the Washington Justice and Toronto Defiant to claim their first back-to-back victories of season. The Mayhem ended the Stage with a 3–4 record.

== Final roster ==
2019 Florida Mayhem roster
Players
Coaches

Role	No.	Handle	Name	Nationality
Damage	4	Sayaplayer	Ha Jeong-woo	South Korea
Damage	22	BQB	Lee Sang-bum	South Korea
Damage	99	DPI	Choi Yong-joon	South Korea
Tank	1	Fate	Koo Pan-seung	South Korea
Tank	15	Karayan	Choi San-ha	South Korea
Tank	16	Swon	Yoon Sang-won	South Korea
Tank	32	xepheR	Koo Jae-mo	South Korea
Tank	98	Gargoyle	Lee Beom-jun	South Korea
Support	24	HaGoPeun	Jo Hyeon-woo	South Korea
Support	41	Byrem	Lee Seong-ju	South Korea
Support	77	RaiN	Park Jae-ho	South Korea
Support	96	Kris	Choi Jun-doo	South Korea

Head coach

- Oh Nam-hun

Legend:
- (I) Inactive
- (S) Suspended
- (2W) Two-way player
- Substitute
- (injured) Injury / Illness

Latest roster transaction: June 19, 2019.

=== Transactions ===
Transactions of/for players on the roster during the 2019 regular season:

- On February 22, Mayhem signed Caleb "Mcgravy" McGarvy.
- On May 10, Mayhem traded Caleb "Mcgravy" McGarvy, Russell "FCTFCTN" Campbell, (Note: Traded from Mayhem Academy.) and Johannes "Shax" Nielsen to Los Angeles Valiant in exchange for Koo "Fate" Pan-seung.
- On May 13, Mayhem signed Lee "Byrem" Seong-ju.
- On May 29, Mayhem released Damon "Apply" Conti.
- On June 2, Mayhem released Kevyn "TviQ" Lindström and Kim "SNT" Sung-hoon.
- On June 17, Mayhem signed Park "RaiN" Jae-ho.
- On June 19, Mayhem signed Lee "Gargoyle" Beom-jun, Choi "DPI" Yong-joon, and Choi "Karayan" San-ha.

== Standings ==
=== Record by stage ===
Stage	Pld	W	L	Pct	MW	ML	MT	MD	Pos
1	7	1	6	.143	9	21	1	-12	19
2	7	0	7	.000	6	21	1	-15	19
3	7	1	6	.143	4	23	1	-19	18
4 (Note: No stage playoffs were held for Stage 4.)	7	4	3	.571	17	10	2	+7	6
Overall	28	6	22	.214	36	75	5	-39	20
Qualified for playoffs • Qualified for play-in tournament

=== League ===
Pos	Div	Team	Pld	W	L	PCT	MW	ML	MT	MD	Qualification
1	PAC	Vancouver Titans	28	25	3	0.893	89	28	0	+61	Advance to season playoffs (division leaders)
2	ATL	New York Excelsior	28	22	6	0.786	78	38	3	+40	Advance to season playoffs (division leaders)
3	PAC	San Francisco Shock	28	23	5	0.821	92	26	0	+66	Advance to season playoffs
4	PAC	Hangzhou Spark	28	18	10	0.643	64	52	4	+12	Advance to season playoffs
5	PAC	Los Angeles Gladiators	28	17	11	0.607	67	48	3	+19	Advance to season playoffs
6	ATL	Atlanta Reign	28	16	12	0.571	69	50	1	+19	Advance to season playoffs
7	ATL	London Spitfire	28	16	12	0.571	58	52	6	+6	Advance to play-ins
8	PAC	Seoul Dynasty	28	15	13	0.536	64	50	3	+14	Advance to play-ins
9	PAC	Guangzhou Charge	28	15	13	0.536	61	57	1	+4	Advance to play-ins
10	ATL	Philadelphia Fusion	28	15	13	0.536	57	60	3	−3	Advance to play-ins
11	PAC	Shanghai Dragons	28	13	15	0.464	51	61	3	−10	Advance to play-ins
12	PAC	Chengdu Hunters	28	13	15	0.464	55	66	1	−11	Advance to play-ins
13	PAC	Los Angeles Valiant	28	12	16	0.429	56	61	4	−5	
14	ATL	Paris Eternal	28	11	17	0.393	46	67	3	−21	
15	PAC	Dallas Fuel	28	10	18	0.357	43	70	3	−27	
16	ATL	Houston Outlaws	28	9	19	0.321	47	69	3	−22	
17	ATL	Toronto Defiant	28	8	20	0.286	39	72	4	−33	
18	ATL	Washington Justice	28	8	20	0.286	39	72	6	−33	
19	ATL	Boston Uprising	28	8	20	0.286	41	78	2	−37	
20	ATL	Florida Mayhem	28	6	22	0.214	36	75	5	−39	

Source: The Overwatch League
Rules for classification: 1) winning percentage; 2) map differential; 3) head-to-head record; 4) head-to-head map differential

== Game log ==
2019 game log (Regular season record: 6–22)
Stage 1 (1–6)

1	February 15	Atlanta Reign	4	–	0	Florida Mayhem	Burbank, CA
		Recap					Blizzard Arena
		2	Ilios			0	
		2	Hollywood			1	
		5	Volskaya Industries			4	
		2	Route 66			1	

2	February 21	Philadelphia Fusion	1	–	2	Florida Mayhem	Burbank, CA
		Recap					Blizzard Arena
		0	Nepal			2	
		4	Numbani			3	
		4	Temple of Anubis			4	
		0	Route 66			1	

3	February 23	Chengdu Hunters	3	–	2	Florida Mayhem	Burbank, CA
		Recap					Blizzard Arena
		2	Nepal			1	
		2	King's Row			3	
		2	Temple of Anubis			0	
		2	Rialto			3	
		2	Busan			0	

4	February 28	Florida Mayhem	2	–	3	Guangzhou Charge	Burbank, CA
		Recap					Blizzard Arena
		0	Busan			2	
		2	Numbani			1	
		0	Horizon Lunar Colony			1	
		2	Rialto			1	
		0	Ilios			2	

5	March 02	Florida Mayhem	1	–	3	Houston Outlaws	Burbank, CA
		Recap					Blizzard Arena
		1	Ilios			2	
		3	King's Row			5	
		3	Horizon Lunar Colony			4	
		2	Rialto			1	

6	March 10	Florida Mayhem	0	–	4	Boston Uprising	Burbank, CA
		Recap					Blizzard Arena
		0	Busan			2	
		2	Numbani			3	
		4	Horizon Lunar Colony			5	
		2	Dorado			3	

7	March 17	Washington Justice	3	–	2	Florida Mayhem	Burbank, CA
		Recap					Blizzard Arena
		2	Nepal			1	
		3	Hollywood			2	
		4	Volskaya Industries			5	
		4	Dorado			5	
		2	Ilios			1	

Stage 2 (0–7)

8	April 05	London Spitfire	2	–	1	Florida Mayhem	Burbank, CA
	4:00 pm PST	Recap					Blizzard Arena
		2	Lijang Tower			0	
		2	Hanamura			3	
		3	Eichenwalde			3	
		1	Watchpoint: Gibraltar			0	

9	April 06	Florida Mayhem	1	–	3	Philadelphia Fusion	Burbank, CA
	12:00 noon PST	Recap					Blizzard Arena
		2	Oasis			0	
		2	Temple of Anubis			3	
		3	King's Row			4	
		4	Junkertown			5	

10	April 11	Paris Eternal	3	–	1	Florida Mayhem	Burbank, CA
	4:00 pm PST	Recap					Blizzard Arena
		2	Oasis			0	
		4	Hanamura			3	
		3	Blizzard World			2	
		1	Watchpoint: Gibraltar			2	

11	April 14	New York Excelsior	4	–	0	Florida Mayhem	Burbank, CA
	3:00 pm PST	Recap					Blizzard Arena
		2	Oasis			0	
		2	Paris			1	
		3	King's Row			2	
		3	Junkertown			2	

12	April 18	Florida Mayhem	1	–	3	Los Angeles Gladiators	Burbank, CA
	7:00 pm PST	Recap					Blizzard Arena
		2	Busan			0	
		1	Paris			2	
		2	Blizzard World			3	
		2	Junkertown			3	

13	April 20	Shanghai Dragons	3	–	1	Florida Mayhem	Burbank, CA
	1:30 pm PST	Recap					Blizzard Arena
		2	Lijiang Tower			1	
		3	Hanamura			4	
		3	Eichenwalde			1	
		3	Rialto			0	

14	May 02	Dallas Fuel	3	–	1	Florida Mayhem	Burbank, CA
	5:30 pm PST	Details					Blizzard Arena
		2	Busan			1	
		5	Temple of Anubis			6	
		3	King's Row			2	
		3	Rialto			0	

Stage 3 (1–6)

15	June 07	Florida Mayhem	0	–	4	Seoul Dynasty	Burbank, CA
	5:45 pm PST	Details					Blizzard Arena
		0	Oasis			2	
		1	Paris			2	
		2	Hollywood			3	
		1	Havana			2	

16	June 16	Florida Mayhem	1	–	3	Paris Eternal	Burbank, CA
	1:45 pm PST	Details					Blizzard Arena
		0	Nepal			2	
		4	Horizon Lunar Colony			5	
		1	Numbani			0	
		2	Havana			3	

17	June 21	San Francisco Shock	4	–	0	Florida Mayhem	Burbank, CA
	5:45 pm PST	Details					Blizzard Arena
		2	Nepal			0	
		3	Volskaya Industries			2	
		5	Numbani			4	
		3	Watchpoint: Gibraltar			0	

18	June 23	Houston Outlaws	1	–	3	Florida Mayhem	Burbank, CA
	3:30 pm PST	Details					Blizzard Arena
		2	Ilios			0	
		2	Paris			3	
		2	Hollywood			3	
		2	Watchpoint: Gibraltar			3	

19	June 29	Florida Mayhem	0	–	4	Hangzhou Spark	Burbank, CA
	3:30 pm PST	Details					Blizzard Arena
		0	Nepal			2	
		1	Volskaya Industries			2	
		0	Eichenwalde			3	
		1	Dorado			3	

20	July 06	Florida Mayhem	0	–	3	New York Excelsior	Atlanta, GA
	8:30 am PST	Details					Cobb Energy Center
		1	Oasis			2	
		2	Volskaya Industries			2	
		2	Eichenwalde			3	
		0	Havana			1	

21	July 07	Florida Mayhem	0	–	4	Atlanta Reign	Atlanta, GA
	12:45 pm PST	Details					Cobb Energy Center
		1	Ilios			2	
		2	Horizon Lunar Colony			3	
		1	Eichenwalde			3	
		1	Dorado			2	

Stage 4 (4–3)

22	July 28	Vancouver Titans	4	–	0	Florida Mayhem	Burbank, CA
	3:30 pm PST	Details					Blizzard Arena
		2	Lijiang Tower			1	
		2	Temple of Anubis			1	
		3	Blizzard World			1	
		3	Junkertown			2	

23	August 01	Florida Mayhem	2	–	3	Washington Justice	Burbank, CA
	5:45 pm PST	Details					Blizzard Arena
		2	Busan			1	
		2	Volskaya Industries			0	
		1	King's Row			2	
		0	Havana			3	
		0	Ilios			2	

24	August 03	Florida Mayhem	3	–	0	London Spitfire	Burbank, CA
	1:45 pm PST	Details					Blizzard Arena
		2	Lijiang Tower			0	
		1	Volskaya Industries			0	
		3	Blizzard World			3	
		3	Junkertown			2	

25	August 08	Toronto Defiant	1	–	3	Florida Mayhem	Burbank, CA
	7:30 pm PST	Details					Blizzard Arena
		2	Ilios			0	
		1	Hanamura			2	
		1	King's Row			3	
		2	Havana			3	

26	August 10	Florida Mayhem	1	–	2	Los Angeles Valiant	Burbank, CA
	3:30 pm PST	Details					Blizzard Arena
		0	Ilios			2	
		1	Temple of Anubis			1	
		1	Hollywood			0	
		4	Junkertown			5	

27	August 15	Boston Uprising	0	–	4	Florida Mayhem	Burbank, CA
	4:00 pm PST	Details					Blizzard Arena
		0	Ilios			2	
		2	Hanamura			3	
		1	Hollywood			2	
		0	Route 66			1	

28	August 18	Florida Mayhem	4	–	0	Toronto Defiant	Burbank, CA
	3:30 pm PST	Details					Blizzard Arena
		2	Busan			0	
		4	Hanamura			2	
		3	Blizzard World			1	
		6	Route 66			4	

== Awards ==
On May 8, Ha "Sayaplayer" Jeong-Woo was named as a reserve for the 2019 Overwatch League All-Star Game.
