= 2019 Philadelphia Fusion season =

- Head coach: Go Se-hwi; Elliot Hayes
- General manager: Yann Luu
- Owner: Comcast Spectacor
- Division: Atlantic

Results
- Record: 15–13 (.536)
- Place: Atlantic: 4th; League: 10th
- Stage 1 Playoffs: Semifinals
- Stage 2 Playoffs: Did not qualify
- Stage 3 Playoffs: Did not qualify
- Season Playoffs: Did not qualify
- Total Earnings: $50,000

The 2019 Philadelphia Fusion season was the second season of the Philadelphia Fusion's existence in the Overwatch League and their first under co-head coaches Go Se-hwi and Elliot Hayes. They entered the season looking to bounce back after their 2018 Grand Finals loss to the London Spitfire.

The Fusion had a solid Stage 1 performance, finishing the stage with a 5–2 record and making it to the Stage 1 Playoffs, but they lost in the semifinals to the San Francisco Shock. After posting 3–4 and 4–3 records for Stage 2 and Stage 3, respectively, Philadelphia failed to qualify any other stage playoffs. A 3–1 victory over the Seoul Dynasty in their final regular season match gave the Fusion a 15–13 season record and qualified them for the Play-In Tournament. Philadelphia fell 2–4 to the Shanghai Dragons in the first round of the tournament, ending their hope of qualifying for the season playoffs.

== Preceding offseason ==
=== Player re-signings and free agency ===
From August 1 to September 9, 2018, all Overwatch League teams that competed in the 2018 season could choose to extend their team's players' contracts. Fusion elected to release Georgii "ShaDowBurn" Gushcha, Park "DayFly" Jeong-hwan, and Joseph "Joemeister" Gramano.

All non-expansion teams could not enter the free agency period until October 8, 2018; they were able to sign members from their respective academy team and make trades until then. On September 25, Fusion promoted support player Elijah "Elk" Gallagher from Fusion University on a two-way contract. On October 17, Fusion transferred Choi "Hotba" Hong-jun to the new expansion team Guangzhou Charge.

=== Head coach change ===
In January, the Fusion announced that head coach Yann Luu would be acting as the organization's Director of Overwatch Operations. In his replacement, assistant coaches Elliot Hayes and Se-Hwi Go were promoted to co-head coaches.

== Regular season ==
Philadelphia opened their season on February 14 against the London Spitfire – a rematch of the 2018 Overwatch League Grand Finals. Philadelphia went on to win the match by a score of 3–1. The team finished with a 5–2 Stage 1 record and a Stage 1 Playoff berth. At the end of Stage 1, the Fusion was tied with the Toronto Defiant for the third seed of the playoffs. By rule, the teams would have to compete in an offline match to determine seeding; however, both teams agreed on a coin-flip, instead. Philadelphia received the fourth seed and would take on the Atlanta Reign in the quarterfinals. The Fusion's quarterfinal match took place on March 22 against the Atlanta Reign; the Fusion won the match, 3–1, advancing them to the Stage 1 semifinals. In the semifinals, Philadelphia was swept, 0–4, by the San Francisco Shock.

In Stage 2, on April 19, the Fusion defeated the Houston Outlaws, 4–0, marking their first 4–0 sweep of the 2019 season. The team finished the stage with a 3–4 record and did not qualify for the Stage 2 Playoffs.

In the last week of Stage 3, the Fusion headed to the Cobb Energy Performing Arts Centre in Atlanta to play at the "Atlanta Reign Homestand Weekend"; Philadelphia's final match of the stage was against the Shanghai Dragons. With both teams holding a 4–2 record in Stage 3, the winner of the match would qualify for the final spot in the Stage 3 Playoffs. The Fusion were unable to pull out the win, however, and fell in the match by a score of 1–3.

Prior to the start of Stage 4, which would include the implementation of an enforced 2-2-2 role lock by the League, the Fusion traded main tank Joona "Fragi" Laine to the Guangzhou Charge in exchange for DPS Finley "Kyb" Adisi. Philadelphia finished the regular season in 10th place in the season standings with a 15–13 record and qualified for the Play-In Tournament.

== Postseason ==
Finishing in tenth place in the regular season standings, the Dragons qualified for the Play-In Tournament for the chance to qualify for the season playoffs. The team took on the eleventh-seeded Shanghai Dragons in the first round on August 30. The Dragon jumped out to an early 2–0 lead after winning on Busan and King's Row, but after the match break, Philadelphia forced a tie on Temple of Anubis and won on Watchpoint: Gibraltar. Shanghai recovered and took a win on Lijiang Tower, but the Fusion struck back with a win on King's Row. The Fusion selected Dorado for what would be the final map of the series; both teams completed the map on their respective attacks, but the Dragons managed to grab the map win in overtime rounds. The 2–4 loss eliminated the Fusion from playoff contention.

== Final roster ==
2019 Philadelphia Fusion roster
Players
Coaches

Role	No.	Handle	Name	Nationality
Damage	3	snillo (TW)	Ekström, Simon	Sweden
Damage	15	Eqo	Corona, Josue	Israel
Damage	18	Carpe	Lee Jae-hyeok	South Korea
Damage	1	Kyb	Adisi, Finley	United Kingdom
Tank	9	SADO	Kim Su-min	South Korea
Tank	21	Poko	Gouzerch, Gael	France
Support	8	neptuNo	González, Alberto	Spain
Support	17	Elk (TW, I)	Gallagher, Elijah	United States
Support	42	Boombox	Charles, Isaac	United Kingdom

Head coach

- Go Se-hwi
- Elliot Hayes

Legend:
- (I) Inactive
- (S) Suspended
- (2W) Two-way player
- Substitute
- (injured) Injury / Illness

Latest roster transaction: July 17, 2019.

=== Transactions ===
Transactions of/for players on the roster during the 2019 regular season:

- On July 17, Fusion traded Joona "Fragi" Laine to Guangzhou Charge in exchange for Finley "Kyb" Adisi.

== Standings ==
=== Record by stage ===
Stage	Pld	W	L	Pct	MW	ML	MT	MD	Pos
1	7	5	2	.714	17	12	1	+5	3
2	7	3	4	.429	12	15	1	-3	11
3	7	4	3	.571	13	16	1	-3	11
4 (Note: No stage playoffs were held for Stage 4.)	7	3	4	.429	15	17	0	-2	12
Overall	28	15	13	.536	57	60	3	-3	10
Qualified for playoffs • Qualified for play-in tournament

=== League ===
Pos	Div	Team	Pld	W	L	PCT	MW	ML	MT	MD	Qualification
1	PAC	Vancouver Titans	28	25	3	0.893	89	28	0	+61	Advance to season playoffs (division leaders)
2	ATL	New York Excelsior	28	22	6	0.786	78	38	3	+40	Advance to season playoffs (division leaders)
3	PAC	San Francisco Shock	28	23	5	0.821	92	26	0	+66	Advance to season playoffs
4	PAC	Hangzhou Spark	28	18	10	0.643	64	52	4	+12	Advance to season playoffs
5	PAC	Los Angeles Gladiators	28	17	11	0.607	67	48	3	+19	Advance to season playoffs
6	ATL	Atlanta Reign	28	16	12	0.571	69	50	1	+19	Advance to season playoffs
7	ATL	London Spitfire	28	16	12	0.571	58	52	6	+6	Advance to play-ins
8	PAC	Seoul Dynasty	28	15	13	0.536	64	50	3	+14	Advance to play-ins
9	PAC	Guangzhou Charge	28	15	13	0.536	61	57	1	+4	Advance to play-ins
10	ATL	Philadelphia Fusion	28	15	13	0.536	57	60	3	−3	Advance to play-ins
11	PAC	Shanghai Dragons	28	13	15	0.464	51	61	3	−10	Advance to play-ins
12	PAC	Chengdu Hunters	28	13	15	0.464	55	66	1	−11	Advance to play-ins
13	PAC	Los Angeles Valiant	28	12	16	0.429	56	61	4	−5	
14	ATL	Paris Eternal	28	11	17	0.393	46	67	3	−21	
15	PAC	Dallas Fuel	28	10	18	0.357	43	70	3	−27	
16	ATL	Houston Outlaws	28	9	19	0.321	47	69	3	−22	
17	ATL	Toronto Defiant	28	8	20	0.286	39	72	4	−33	
18	ATL	Washington Justice	28	8	20	0.286	39	72	6	−33	
19	ATL	Boston Uprising	28	8	20	0.286	41	78	2	−37	
20	ATL	Florida Mayhem	28	6	22	0.214	36	75	5	−39	

Source: The Overwatch League
Rules for classification: 1) winning percentage; 2) map differential; 3) head-to-head record; 4) head-to-head map differential

== Game log ==
=== Regular season ===
2019 game log (Regular season record: 15–13)
Stage 1 (5–2)

1	February 14	Philadelphia Fusion	3	–	1	London Spitfire	Burbank, CA
		Recap					Blizzard Arena
		2	Ilios			1	
		3	Hollywood			2	
		4	Volskaya Industries			5	
		1	Rialto			0	

2	February 17	Philadelphia Fusion	3	–	2	Atlanta Reign	Burbank, CA
		Recap					Blizzard Arena
		1	Nepal			2	
		2	King's Row			1	
		4	Volskaya Industries			5	
		2	Dorado			1	
		2	Ilios			1	

3	February 21	Philadelphia Fusion	1	–	2	Florida Mayhem	Burbank, CA
		Recap					Blizzard Arena
		0	Nepal			2	
		4	Numbani			3	
		4	Temple of Anubis			4	
		0	Route 66			1	

4	February 23	Philadelphia Fusion	1	–	3	Dallas Fuel	Burbank, CA
		Recap					Blizzard Arena
		0	Busan			2	
		1	Numbani			3	
		4	Horizon Lunar Colony			3	
		2	Dorado			3	

5	February 28	Washington Justice	1	–	3	Philadelphia Fusion	Burbank, CA
		Recap					Blizzard Arena
		2	Ilios			1	
		1	Hollywood			2	
		3	Temple of Anubis			4	
		1	Route 66			3	

6	March 07	Los Angeles Valiant	2	–	3	Philadelphia Fusion	Burbank, CA
		Recap					Blizzard Arena
		0	Nepal			2	
		2	Numbani			3	
		2	Temple of Anubis			1	
		3	Route 66			0	
		1	Busan			2	

7	March 17	Philadelphia Fusion	3	–	1	Paris Eternal	Burbank, CA
		Recap					Blizzard Arena
		1	Busan			2	
		3	King's Row			2	
		1	Horizon Lunar Colony			0	
		3	Rialto			0	

Stage 1 Playoffs

Quarterfinals	March 22	Atlanta Reign	1	–	3	Philadelphia Fusion	Burbank, CA
	6:00 pm PST	Recap					Blizzard Arena
		2	Ilios			1	
		1	King's Row			2	
		3	Volskaya Industries			4	
		1	Route 66			2	

Semifinals	March 23	San Francisco Shock	4	–	0	Philadelphia Fusion	Burbank, CA
	3:00 pm PST	Recap					Blizzard Arena
		2	Ilios			0	
		3	Hollywood			0	
		4	Horizon Lunar Colony			2	
		3	Rialto			0	

Stage 2 (3–4)

8	April 04	Philadelphia Fusion	0	–	4	New York Excelsior	Burbank, CA
	4:00 pm PST	Recap					Blizzard Arena
		0	Lijang Tower			2	
		1	Paris			2	
		2	Eichenwalde			3	
		1	Rialto			3	

9	April 06	Florida Mayhem	1	–	3	Philadelphia Fusion	Burbank, CA
	12:00 noon PST	Recap					Blizzard Arena
		2	Oasis			0	
		2	Temple of Anubis			3	
		3	King's Row			4	
		4	Junkertown			5	

10	April 11	Toronto Defiant	1	–	3	Philadelphia Fusion	Burbank, CA
	8:30 pm PST	Details					Blizzard Arena
		0	Busan			2	
		4	Paris			3	
		2	Blizzard World			3	
		2	Watchpoint: Gibraltar			3	

11	April 13	London Spitfire	2	–	1	Philadelphia Fusion	Burbank, CA
	12:00 noon PST	Recap					Blizzard Arena
		2	Lijiang Tower			1	
		2	Hanamura			2	
		3	Blizzard World			4	
		3	Rialto			2	

12	April 18	New York Excelsior	3	–	1	Philadelphia Fusion	Burbank, CA
	4:00 pm PST	Recap					Blizzard Arena
		2	Busan			0	
		3	Temple of Anubis			2	
		2	Blizzard World			3	
		1	Watchpoint: Gibraltar			0	

13	April 19	Philadelphia Fusion	4	–	0	Houston Outlaws	Burbank, CA
	5:30 pm PST	Recap					Blizzard Arena
		2	Busan			1	
		3	Temple of Anubis			2	
		2	Eichenwalde			0	
		3	Watchpoint: Gibraltar			0	

14	May 02	Philadelphia Fusion	0	–	4	San Francisco Shock	Burbank, CA
	7:00 pm PST	Details					Blizzard Arena
		1	Oasis			2	
		1	Hanamura			2	
		1	King's Row			3	
		0	Junkertown			3	

Stage 3 (4–3)

15	June 08	Hangzhou Spark	4	–	0	Philadelphia Fusion	Burbank, CA
	12:00 noon PST	Details					Blizzard Arena
		2	Oasis			0	
		2	Paris			1	
		3	Eichenwalde			0	
		3	Watchpoint: Gibraltar			2	

16	June 14	Los Angeles Gladiators	3	–	1	Philadelphia Fusion	Burbank, CA
	9:15 pm PST	Details					Blizzard Arena
		2	Oasis			0	
		6	Volskaya Industries			5	
		2	Eichenwalde			1	
		1	Dorado			2	

17	June 16	Philadelphia Fusion	2	–	1	Boston Uprising	Burbank, CA
	3:30 pm PST	Details					Blizzard Arena
		0	Ilios			2	
		4	Paris			4	
		1	Hollywood			0	
		1	Watchpoint: Gibraltar			0	

18	June 22	Atlanta Reign	2	–	3	Philadelphia Fusion	Burbank, CA
	1:45 pm PST	Details					Blizzard Arena
		2	Nepal			1	
		1	Horizon Lunar Colony			2	
		0	Numbani			2	
		2	Havana			1	
		0	Ilios			2	

19	June 29	Boston Uprising	2	–	3	Philadelphia Fusion	Burbank, CA
	1:45 pm PST	Details					Blizzard Arena
		0	Nepal			2	
		2	Horizon Lunar Colony			1	
		0	Numbani			1	
		2	Havana			1	
		1	Ilios			2	

20	July 06	Philadelphia Fusion	3	–	1	Washington Justice	Atlanta, GA
	10:15 am PST	Details					Cobb Energy Center
		1	Ilios			2	
		3	Horizon Lunar Colony			2	
		3	Hollywood			1	
		3	Watchpoint: Gibraltar			2	

21	July 07	Philadelphia Fusion	1	–	3	Shanghai Dragons	Atlanta, GA
	9:00 am PST	Details					Cobb Energy Center
		1	Ilios			2	
		3	Volskaya Industries			4	
		4	Hollywood			3	
		0	Dorado			2	

Stage 4 (3–4)

22	July 25	Guangzhou Charge	3	–	2	Philadelphia Fusion	Burbank, CA
	7:10 pm PST	Details					Blizzard Arena
		0	Busan			2	
		2	Volskaya Industries			1	
		4	King's Row			3	
		3	Junkertown			4	
		2	Ilios			0	

23	July 26	Philadelphia Fusion	2	–	3	Chengdu Hunters	Burbank, CA
	9:15 pm PST	Details					Blizzard Arena
		0	Busan			2	
		3	Hanamura			2	
		2	Blizzard World			3	
		2	Junkertown			1	
		1	Ilios			2	

24	August 02	Houston Outlaws	1	–	3	Philadelphia Fusion	Burbank, CA
	5:45 pm PST	Details					Blizzard Arena
		0	Ilios			2	
		2	Temple of Anubis			1	
		1	Hollywood			2	
		3	Havana			6	

25	August 04	Philadelphia Fusion	3	–	2	Toronto Defiant	Burbank, CA
	1:45 pm PST	Details					Blizzard Arena
		2	Lijiang Tower			0	
		0	Volskaya Industries			1	
		0	King's Row			1	
		3	Havana			2	
		2	Busan			0	

26	August 08	Paris Eternal	3	–	2	Philadelphia Fusion	Burbank, CA
	5:45 pm PST	Details					Blizzard Arena
		1	Ilios			2	
		1	Temple of Anubis			2	
		2	Hollywood			1	
		3	Route 66			2	
		2	Lijiang Towe			1	

27	August 11	Philadelphia Fusion	0	–	4	Vancouver Titans	Burbank, CA
	12:00 noon PST	Details					Blizzard Arena
		1	Busan			2	
		2	Hanamura			3	
		1	Blizzard World			3	
		0	Route 66			3	

28	August 17	Seoul Dynasty	1	–	3	Philadelphia Fusion	Burbank, CA
	3:30 pm PST	Details					Blizzard Arena
		1	Lijiang Tower			2	
		1	Volskaya Industries			0	
		2	Blizzard World			3	
		1	Havana			2	

=== Playoffs ===
2019 playoff game log
Play-In Tournament (0–1)

Quarterfinals	August 30	Shanghai Dragons	4	–	2	Philadelphia Fusion	Burbank, CA
	9:00 pm PST	Details					Blizzard Arena
		2	Busan			1	
		5	King's Row			4	
		3	Temple of Anubis			3	
		3	Watchpoint: Gibraltar			4	
		2	Lijiang Tower			1	
		1	King's Row			3	
		5	Dorado			4	

== Awards ==
On May 1, Lee "Carpe" Jae-hyeok was named as a starter for the 2019 Overwatch League All-Star Game. A week later Gael "Poko" Gouzerch was named as a reserve for the All-Star Game.
