= 2019 Overwatch League season =

- League: Overwatch League
- Sport: Overwatch
- Duration: February 14 – August 25; September 5 – 29 (Playoffs)
- Matches: 28
- Teams: 20
- TV partners: Global: Major League Gaming; Twitch; United States: ESPN; Disney XD; ABC (Playoffs); France: AB1; Germany: Esports1

Regular season
- Top seed: Vancouver Titans
- Season MVP: Jay "sinatraa" Won

Stage Champions
- Stage 1: Vancouver Titans
- Stage 2: San Francisco Shock
- Stage 3: Shanghai Dragons

Grand Finals
- Venue: Wells Fargo Center, Philadelphia, Pennsylvania
- Champions: San Francisco Shock
- Runners-up: Vancouver Titans
- Finals MVP: Choi "ChoiHyoBin" Hyo-Bin

Overwatch League seasons
- ← 2018 2020 →

The 2019 Overwatch League season was the second season of the Overwatch League (OWL), an esport based on the video game Overwatch. The league expanded from 12 teams from the inaugural season to 20 teams. Of the eight new teams, two were from the United States, two were from Canada, one was from France, and three were from China.

The season began on February 14, 2019, and ended on August 25. Postseason play began in late August. The San Francisco Shock won the Grand Finals over the Vancouver Titans to become the league champions.

== League changes ==
=== Expansion ===
The Overwatch League initially launched with twelve teams in the 2018 season. During this season, Blizzard stated it planned to expand out the league to add six teams, ideally gaining more teams in European and Asian regions, and started meeting with potential owners in March 2018. By September 2018, Blizzard confirmed it had signed eight additional teams based in Atlanta, Guangzhou, Hangzhou, Toronto, Paris, Washington D.C., Vancouver, and Chengdu, bringing the total team count to twenty. Whereas the franchising fee was estimated to be US$20 million in the inaugural season, the fee was estimated by observers to have gone as high as US$50 million for these new teams. The eight teams were distributed evenly between the two Divisions, with the North American East Coast and European teams joining the Atlantic Division, and the Chinese and North American West Coast teams added to the Pacific Division.

=== Schedule ===
The 2019 season's revised schedule format was announced on December 12, 2018. The season kept the four-stage format that was used in the 2018 season, though only the first three stages had playoffs, while the fourth stage's playoffs were replaced by a six-team play-in tournament to determine the final two postseason teams. The top six season playoff teams were determined by the same way they were in 2018; the top two teams from each division and the next four teams, regardless of division. The season playoffs were contested in a double-elimination tournament. Teams played 28 regular season games instead of 40, with the league citing players' mental health and additional chances to interact with their home cities as reasons for the change. Each stage still lasted five weeks, though the break between stages increased from one week to two weeks (except for the break between stages 2 and 3, which was four weeks due to the league's All-Star Weekend). Each week featured three to four games on Thursday and Friday and four games on Saturday and Sunday, totaling either fourteen or sixteen games per week, up from twelve in 2018. Teams played zero, one, or two matches per week. The stage playoffs doubled in size from 2018, expanding to eight teams, up from the four team system introduced in 2018's third stage. The top team from each division held the first and second seed, followed by the next six teams, regardless of division.

The Grand Finals were held at the Wells Fargo Center in Philadelphia, Pennsylvania on September 29, 2019.

=== Prize pool ===
The prize pool was increased from US$3,500,000 to $5,000,000. All eight teams who qualified for each Stage Playoffs earned at least $25,000. Each stage champion earned $200,000 (up from $100,000 in 2018), while the amount earned by the runners-up quadrupled from 2018 to $100,000. Third and fourth place teams earned $50,000 while fifth through eighth place teams earned $25,000. For the postseason earnings, the Grand Champion team will earn $1.1 million (up from $1 million), second place will earn $600,000, third place will earn $450,000, fourth place will earn $350,000, fifth and sixth place will earn $300,000, and seventh and eighth place will earn $200,000.

=== Player contracts ===
The season's free agency signing window opened to expansion teams on September 10, 2018, and closed on October 7, the day before the window for all teams opened. Each teams had to sign at least 12 players by December 1.

The 2019 season was also the first in which two-way contracts were in effect. Players signed to these contracts primarily played for their OWL team's academy team that played in Overwatch Contenders. They were unable to play in more than two OWL matches in a stage, nor could they play in an OWL match and a Contenders match in the same week. These players counted towards the OWL team's 12-player limit.

=== Venues ===
Though most matches were still played at the 350-seat Blizzard Arena, the 2019 season introduced three "Homestand Weeks," which took place in three Overwatch League cities. These were held as practice runs for the planned expansion of the Overwatch League into true home-and-away formats for the 2020 season, seeing teams travel across the globe to compete. The fourth week of Stage 2 was held at the Allen Event Center in Allen, Texas and was hosted by the Dallas Fuel. The fifth week of Stage 3 was held at the Cobb Energy Performing Arts Centre in Cumberland, Georgia and was hosted by the Atlanta Reign. The fifth week of Stage 4, dubbed "Kit Kat Rivalry Weekend," was held at The Novo by Microsoft in Los Angeles, California and was hosted by the Los Angeles Valiant.

== Broadcasting ==
All matches were broadcast on the Overwatch League's website and through Major League Gaming (owned by Blizzard), and by third-party broadcaster Twitch. On the first day of the 2018 season playoffs, Disney and Blizzard announced a multi-year partnership that would bring OWL and other organized Overwatch competitive events to ESPN, Disney XD, and ABC, starting with the playoffs and continuing through the 2019 season. On January 28, 2019, Blizzard announced that new dedicated esports channel Esports1, owned by German sports channel Sport1, would be broadcasting Overwatch League events in Germany, Switzerland, and Austria.

== Regular season ==
A team's standing was based on their overall match win–loss record, with ties broken by map differential, head-to-head map record, and head-to-head match record, in that order. If a tie that affects the qualification for Stage or Postseason playoffs still cannot be broken, the teams were to play a tiebreaker match.

The season playoff teams consisted of the two division winners, four wild card teams with the best regular season records regardless of division, and the top two teams from the play-in tournament.

=== Overall standings ===
Pos	Div	Team	Pld	W	L	PCT	MW	ML	MT	MD	Qualification
1	PAC	Vancouver Titans	28	25	3	0.893	89	28	0	+61	Advance to season playoffs (division leaders)
2	ATL	New York Excelsior	28	22	6	0.786	78	38	3	+40	Advance to season playoffs (division leaders)
3	PAC	San Francisco Shock	28	23	5	0.821	92	26	0	+66	Advance to season playoffs
4	PAC	Hangzhou Spark	28	18	10	0.643	64	52	4	+12	Advance to season playoffs
5	PAC	Los Angeles Gladiators	28	17	11	0.607	67	48	3	+19	Advance to season playoffs
6	ATL	Atlanta Reign	28	16	12	0.571	69	50	1	+19	Advance to season playoffs
7	ATL	London Spitfire	28	16	12	0.571	58	52	6	+6	Advance to play-ins
8	PAC	Seoul Dynasty	28	15	13	0.536	64	50	3	+14	Advance to play-ins
9	PAC	Guangzhou Charge	28	15	13	0.536	61	57	1	+4	Advance to play-ins
10	ATL	Philadelphia Fusion	28	15	13	0.536	57	60	3	−3	Advance to play-ins
11	PAC	Shanghai Dragons	28	13	15	0.464	51	61	3	−10	Advance to play-ins
12	PAC	Chengdu Hunters	28	13	15	0.464	55	66	1	−11	Advance to play-ins
13	PAC	Los Angeles Valiant	28	12	16	0.429	56	61	4	−5	
14	ATL	Paris Eternal	28	11	17	0.393	46	67	3	−21	
15	PAC	Dallas Fuel	28	10	18	0.357	43	70	3	−27	
16	ATL	Houston Outlaws	28	9	19	0.321	47	69	3	−22	
17	ATL	Toronto Defiant	28	8	20	0.286	39	72	4	−33	
18	ATL	Washington Justice	28	8	20	0.286	39	72	6	−33	
19	ATL	Boston Uprising	28	8	20	0.286	41	78	2	−37	
20	ATL	Florida Mayhem	28	6	22	0.214	36	75	5	−39	

Source: The Overwatch League
Rules for classification: 1) winning percentage; 2) map differential; 3) head-to-head record; 4) head-to-head map differential

=== Stage 1 ===
Stage 1 ran from February 14 to March 17, 2019, with stage playoffs taking place from March 21–24, 2019. The two division leaders, and the following top six teams, regardless of division, in the Stage 1 standings qualified for the Stage 1 Playoffs. The division winners were awarded the top two seeds, while the remaining teams received seeds three through eight based on their Stage 1 records. All matches emanated from the Blizzard Arena in Burbank, California.

At the conclusion of the first stage, both the Fusion and Defiant were tied for third place after considering all tie-breaking resolutions; similarly, the San Francisco Shock and the Seoul Dynasty were tied for sixth place. By league rules, both ties were to broken by an off-stream match. While the sixth-place tie was decided in this manner, the Defiant and Fusion mutually agreed to settle the third-place tie by a coin flip. Due to issues on reporting the coin flip, league commissioner Nate Nanzer stated that the league would not allow teams to decides such ties by one in the future.

==== Standings ====
Pos	Div	Team	Pld	W	L	PCT	MW	ML	MT	MD	Qualification
1	PAC	Vancouver Titans	7	7	0	1.00	24	6	0	+18	Advance to stage playoffs (division leaders)
2	ATL	New York Excelsior	7	7	0	1.00	22	6	1	+16	Advance to stage playoffs (division leaders)
3	ATL	Toronto Defiant	7	5	2	0.71	16	11	2	+5	Advance to stage playoffs
4	ATL	Philadelphia Fusion	7	5	2	0.71	17	12	1	+5	Advance to stage playoffs
5	ATL	Atlanta Reign	7	4	3	0.57	18	12	0	+6	Advance to stage playoffs
6	PAC	San Francisco Shock	7	4	3	0.57	17	12	0	+5	Advance to stage playoffs
7	PAC	Seoul Dynasty	7	4	3	0.57	16	11	1	+5	Advance to stage playoffs
8	ATL	Boston Uprising	7	4	3	0.57	16	13	1	+3	Advance to stage playoffs
9	PAC	Dallas Fuel	7	4	3	0.57	15	15	0	0	
10	PAC	Los Angeles Gladiators	7	3	4	0.43	14	13	2	+1	
11	PAC	Guangzhou Charge	7	3	4	0.43	15	16	0	−1	
12	ATL	Houston Outlaws	7	3	4	0.43	13	16	1	−3	
13	PAC	Hangzhou Spark	7	3	4	0.43	12	16	1	−4	
14	PAC	Shanghai Dragons	7	3	4	0.43	13	17	0	−4	
15	ATL	London Spitfire	7	3	4	0.43	12	16	2	−4	
16	PAC	Chengdu Hunters	7	3	4	0.43	12	20	0	−8	
17	ATL	Paris Eternal	7	3	4	0.43	9	17	2	−8	
18	ATL	Washington Justice	7	1	6	0.14	9	20	1	−11	
19	ATL	Florida Mayhem	7	1	6	0.14	9	21	1	−12	
20	PAC	Los Angeles Valiant	7	0	7	0.00	10	19	2	−9	

Source: The Overwatch League
Rules for classification: 1) winning percentage; 2) map differential; 3) head-to-head record; 4) head-to-head map differential

==== Playoffs ====
Stage Quarterfinals
1	Vancouver Titans	3
8	Boston Uprising	0
4	Philadelphia Fusion	3
5	Atlanta Reign	1
(Pairings are reseeded after the first round)
3	Toronto Defiant	0
6	San Francisco Shock	3
2	New York Excelsior	1
7	Seoul Dynasty	3

Stage Semifinals
1	Vancouver Titans	4
7	Seoul Dynasty	0
4	Philadelphia Fusion	0
6	San Francisco Shock	4

Stage Finals
1	Vancouver Titans	4
6	San Francisco Shock	3

=== Stage 2 ===
Stage 2 ran from April 4 to May 5, 2019, with stage playoffs taking place from May 9–12. The playoff format did not change from Stage 1. All matches emanated from the Blizzard Arena in Burbank, California, except for the fourth week of play, which took place at the Allen Event Center in Allen, Texas – the first of three "Homestand Weeks" of the season. This stage's Homestand Week was hosted by Dallas Fuel.

The second stage was the first in which assault map Paris was available for play. It was also the introduction of new support character Baptiste into professional play. Baptiste was designed by Blizzard as to disrupt a three-tank, three-support composition (frequently called GOATS in the game's player base in reference to the non-league team that popularized it) which had been dominating Overwatch's metagame for several months prior to the 2019 season and had been frequently used by teams during Stage 1.

Due to the tiebreaking issues in Stage 1, the League updated their tiebreaker rules to include head-to-head records across all stages, strength of schedule, and common opponents records.

==== Standings ====
Pos	Div	Team	Pld	W	L	PCT	MW	ML	MT	MD	Qualification
1	PAC	San Francisco Shock	7	7	0	1.00	28	0	0	+28	Advance to stage playoffs (division leaders)
2	ATL	London Spitfire	7	6	1	0.86	21	5	2	+16	Advance to stage playoffs (division leaders)
3	PAC	Vancouver Titans	7	7	0	1.00	25	3	0	+22	Advance to stage playoffs
4	PAC	Los Angeles Gladiators	7	6	1	0.86	19	9	1	+10	Advance to stage playoffs
5	ATL	New York Excelsior	7	5	2	0.71	21	7	1	+14	Advance to stage playoffs
6	PAC	Dallas Fuel	7	5	2	0.71	16	11	1	+5	Advance to stage playoffs
7	PAC	Hangzhou Spark	7	5	2	0.71	15	16	0	−1	Advance to stage playoffs
8	PAC	Shanghai Dragons	7	4	3	0.57	13	13	2	0	Advance to stage playoffs
9	PAC	Chengdu Hunters	7	3	4	0.43	15	14	0	+1	
10	PAC	Seoul Dynasty	7	3	4	0.43	15	15	0	0	
11	ATL	Philadelphia Fusion	7	3	4	0.43	12	15	1	−3	
12	ATL	Atlanta Reign	7	3	4	0.43	14	17	0	−3	
13	ATL	Boston Uprising	7	3	4	0.43	13	19	0	−6	
14	PAC	Los Angeles Valiant	7	3	4	0.43	12	18	1	−6	
15	ATL	Toronto Defiant	7	2	5	0.29	11	18	0	−7	
16	ATL	Paris Eternal	7	2	5	0.29	10	18	1	−8	
17	PAC	Guangzhou Charge	7	2	5	0.29	8	22	0	−14	
18	ATL	Washington Justice	7	1	6	0.14	8	21	0	−13	
19	ATL	Florida Mayhem	7	0	7	0.00	6	21	1	−15	
20	ATL	Houston Outlaws	7	0	7	0.00	4	24	1	−20	

Source: The Overwatch League
Rules for classification: 1) winning percentage; 2) map differential; 3) head-to-head record; 4) head-to-head map differential

==== Playoffs ====
Stage Quarterfinals
1	San Francisco Shock	3
8	Shanghai Dragons	1
4	Los Angeles Gladiators	0
5	New York Excelsior	3
(Pairings are reseeded after the first round)
3	Vancouver Titans	3
6	Dallas Fuel	0
2	London Spitfire	1
7	Hangzhou Spark	3

Stage Semifinals
1	San Francisco Shock	4
7	Hangzhou Spark	0
3	Vancouver Titans	4
5	New York Excelsior	1

Stage Finals
1	San Francisco Shock	4
3	Vancouver Titans	2

=== Stage 3 ===
Stage 3 ran from June 6 to July 7, with the stage playoffs taking place from July 11 to 14. The stage marked the first time that assault map Havana was played in the Overwatch League. All matches in the fifth week of Stage 3 were played at the Cobb Energy Performing Arts Centre in Atlanta, Georgia. The event was the second of three "Homestand Weeks" of the season and was hosted by Atlanta Reign. Additionally, the Overwatch League hosted LGBTQ community Pride Day on June 7 at Blizzard Arena.

==== Standings ====
Pos	Div	Team	Pld	W	L	PCT	MW	ML	MT	MD	Qualification
1	ATL	New York Excelsior	7	7	0	1.00	23	7	1	+16	Advance to stage playoffs (division leaders)
2	PAC	Vancouver Titans	7	6	1	0.86	21	7	0	+14	Advance to stage playoffs (division leaders)
3	PAC	Hangzhou Spark	7	6	1	0.86	21	7	2	+14	Advance to stage playoffs
4	PAC	San Francisco Shock	7	5	2	0.71	23	8	0	+15	Advance to stage playoffs
5	PAC	Seoul Dynasty	7	5	2	0.71	20	8	1	+12	Advance to stage playoffs
6	PAC	Los Angeles Valiant	7	5	2	0.71	20	9	0	+11	Advance to stage playoffs
7	ATL	Houston Outlaws	7	5	2	0.71	19	10	1	+9	Advance to stage playoffs
8	PAC	Shanghai Dragons	7	5	2	0.71	17	12	0	+5	Advance to stage playoffs
9	PAC	Los Angeles Gladiators	7	4	3	0.57	17	11	0	+6	
10	PAC	Guangzhou Charge	7	4	3	0.57	16	12	0	+4	
11	ATL	Philadelphia Fusion	7	4	3	0.57	13	16	1	−3	
12	ATL	Paris Eternal	7	3	4	0.43	14	15	0	−1	
13	PAC	Chengdu Hunters	7	3	4	0.43	12	16	1	−4	
14	ATL	London Spitfire	7	3	4	0.43	11	17	1	−6	
15	ATL	Atlanta Reign	7	2	5	0.29	14	17	0	−3	
16	ATL	Boston Uprising	7	1	6	0.14	7	22	1	−15	
17	PAC	Dallas Fuel	7	1	6	0.14	6	21	2	−15	
18	ATL	Florida Mayhem	7	1	6	0.14	4	23	1	−19	
19	ATL	Toronto Defiant	7	0	7	0.00	4	24	0	−20	
20	ATL	Washington Justice	7	0	7	0.00	2	22	4	−20	

Source: The Overwatch League
Rules for classification: 1) winning percentage; 2) map differential; 3) head-to-head record; 4) head-to-head map differential

==== Playoffs ====
Stage Quarterfinals
1	New York Excelsior	1
8	Shanghai Dragons	3
4	San Francisco Shock	3
5	Seoul Dynasty	1
(Pairings are reseeded after the first round)
3	Hangzhou Spark	2
6	Los Angeles Valiant	3
2	Vancouver Titans	3
7	Houston Outlaws	0

Stage Semifinals
2	Vancouver Titans	1
8	Shanghai Dragons	4
4	San Francisco Shock	4
6	Los Angeles Valiant	0

Stage Finals
4	San Francisco Shock	3
8	Shanghai Dragons	4

=== Stage 4 ===
Stage 4 ran from July 25 through August 25, with matches in the fifth week taking place at The Novo by Microsoft in Los Angeles as the final "Homestand Week".

Stage 4 introduced a forced 2-2-2 team composition – 2 damage heroes, 2 support heroes, and 2 tank heroes, as a means of eliminating a metagame composition that became dominant in the league made of three tanks and three supports, otherwise known as "GOATS," named after the Overwatch Contenders team that popularized it. This GOATS composition was difficult to counter at this level of play and was deemed boring to watch. Blizzard had tried to introduce changes in the game to better counter GOATS, but these failed to materialize. In the forced 2-2-2 composition, players are role locked at a start of a map, though they are free to switch heroes within that role during the map. Between maps, along with normal player substitutions, players can then swap roles. This change also came to normal quickplay and competitive mode in Overwatch outside of the league at the end of September 2019.

==== Standings ====
Pos	Div	Team	Pld	W	L	PCT	MW	ML	MT	MD
1	ATL	Atlanta Reign	7	7	0	1.00	23	4	1	+19
2	PAC	San Francisco Shock	7	7	0	1.00	24	6	0	+18
3	PAC	Guangzhou Charge	7	6	1	0.86	22	7	1	+15
4	ATL	Washington Justice	7	6	1	0.86	20	9	1	+11
5	PAC	Vancouver Titans	7	5	2	0.71	19	12	0	+7
6	ATL	Florida Mayhem	7	4	3	0.57	17	10	2	+7
7	PAC	Hangzhou Spark	7	4	3	0.57	16	13	1	+3
8	PAC	Los Angeles Gladiators	7	4	3	0.57	17	15	0	+2
9	ATL	London Spitfire	7	4	3	0.57	14	14	1	0
10	PAC	Chengdu Hunters	7	4	3	0.57	16	16	0	0
11	PAC	Los Angeles Valiant	7	4	3	0.57	14	15	1	−1
12	ATL	Philadelphia Fusion	7	3	4	0.43	15	17	0	−2
13	PAC	Seoul Dynasty	7	3	4	0.43	13	16	1	−3
14	ATL	Paris Eternal	7	3	4	0.43	13	17	0	−4
15	ATL	New York Excelsior	7	3	4	0.43	12	18	0	−6
16	ATL	Houston Outlaws	7	1	6	0.14	11	19	0	−8
17	PAC	Shanghai Dragons	7	1	6	0.14	8	19	1	−11
18	ATL	Toronto Defiant	7	1	6	0.14	8	19	2	−11
19	PAC	Dallas Fuel	7	0	7	0.00	6	23	0	−17
20	ATL	Boston Uprising	7	0	7	0.00	5	24	0	−19

Source: The Overwatch League
Rules for classification: 1) winning percentage; 2) map differential; 3) head-to-head record; 4) head-to-head map differential

== Postseason ==
=== Play-in tournament ===
The play-in tournament is a single-elimination tournament that took place August 30–31. Each match were first-to-four maps, with the higher seed selecting the first map and the loser of each subsequent map selecting the next. The winners of each quarterfinal match advanced to the semifinals, where they faced either the seventh- or eighth-seeded team, depending on their own seed. The winners of the semifinals qualified for the season playoffs and were seeded according to their regular season records.

==== Bracket ====
Quarterfinals; August 30
9	Guangzhou Charge	4
12	Chengdu Hunters	1
10	Philadelphia Fusion	2
11	Shanghai Dragons	4

Semifinals; August 31
7	London Spitfire	4
11	Shanghai Dragons	3
8	Seoul Dynasty	4
9	Guangzhou Charge	1

=== Playoffs ===
Eight teams competed in the OWL Playoffs – a double-elimination tournament – from September 5 to 29. The winner of each round of the Playoffs was determined by a single-match, where each match winner was determined by which team wins four maps. The final two teams remaining in the tournament advanced to the Grand Finals, which took place at Wells Fargo Center in Philadelphia, Pennsylvania on September 29.

==== Bracket ====
First Round; September 5–6	Winners Round 1 September 8	Winners Round 2 September 13	Grand Finals; September 29
1	Vancouver Titans	4
8	Seoul Dynasty	2
1	Vancouver Titans	4
5	Los Angeles Gladiators	2
4	Hangzhou Spark	3
5	Los Angeles Gladiators	4
1	Vancouver Titans	4
2	New York Excelsior	3
2	New York Excelsior	4
7	London Spitfire	1
2	New York Excelsior	4
6	Atlanta Reign	2
3	San Francisco Shock	3
6	Atlanta Reign	4	1	Vancouver Titans	0
3	San Francisco Shock	4
Losers Round 1 September 7	Losers Round 2 September 12	Losers Round 3 September 14	Losers Round 4 September 15
6	Atlanta Reign	0
4	Hangzhou Spark	4	4	Hangzhou Spark	4	2	New York Excelsior	0
8	Seoul Dynasty	1	4	Hangzhou Spark	0	3	San Francisco Shock	4
3	San Francisco Shock	4
5	Los Angeles Gladiators	0
3	San Francisco Shock	4	3	San Francisco Shock	4
7	London Spitfire	0

== Notable events ==
=== Shanghai Dragons win first match ===
In the 2018 season, the Shanghai Dragons failed to win a match, going 0–40 throughout the regular season. The franchise released eight of their eleven players going into the 2019 season. The Dragons lost their first two matches of the 2019 regular season, bringing their loss streak to 42 matches — the longest loss streak in professional sports history at the time. On February 22, 2019, the Dragons defeated the Boston Uprising, giving the franchise their first win.

=== Sale of the Houston Outlaws ===
On June 12, 2019, Immortals Gaming Club (IGC), the parent company of Immortals and Los Angeles Valiant, acquired Infinite Esports, the parent company of Houston Outlaws and OpTic Gaming, marking the first sale of any Overwatch League franchise. Both Riot Games and Activision Blizzard approved the sale. By OWL rules, one company may not own more than one OWL franchise, so IGC had to operate the Valiant and Outlaws as entirely separate entities, with oversight by OWL representatives, until IGC sold the Outlaws. In November 2019, IGC sold the Outlaws to the Beasley Media Group.

== Awards ==
=== Individual awards ===
Award	Recipient
Most Valuable Player (MVP)	Jay "sinatraa" Won (San Francisco Shock)
Dennis Hawelka Award	Scott "Custa" Kennedy (Los Angeles Valiant)
Rookie of the Year	Kim "Haksal" Hyo-jong (Vancouver Titans)
Grand Finals MVP	Choi "ChoiHyoBin" Hyo-bin (San Francisco Shock)

=== Role Stars ===
Damage	Tank	Support
Corey "Corey" Nigra (Washington Justice)	Choi "Choihyobin" Hyo-bin (San Francisco Shock)	Park "iDK" Ho-jin (Hangzhou Spark)
Yang "DDing" Jin-hyeok (Shanghai Dragons)	Qiulin "Guxue" Xu (Hangzhou Spark)	Park "Kariv" Young-seo (Los Angeles Valiant)
Kim "Haksal" Hyo-jong (Vancouver Titans)	Kim "mano" Dong-gyu (New York Excelsior)	Grant "Moth" Espe (San Francisco Shock)
Jay "sinatraa" Won (San Francisco Shock)	Matthew "super" DeLisi (San Francisco Shock)	Lee "Twilight" Ju-seok (Vancouver Titans)

== All-Star Game ==
The 2019 Overwatch League All-Star Game was the Overwatch League's second edition of an all-star game that involved the All-Star players of the league. The game was played on May 16, 2019, and was the culmination of the league's All-Star Weekend, a two-day event that consisted of the Talent Takedown, a Widowmaker 1v1 tournament, and the All-Star Arcade. All of the events were played at Blizzard Arena in Burbank, California. The game was televised by ESPN2 and streamed live on Twitch.

Team	Map 1	Map 2	Map 3	Map 4	Map 5	Map Wins
Atlantic Division	2	3	2	1	2	4
Pacific Division	0	2	1	2	0	1

== Winnings ==
Teams in the 2019 season competed for a total prize pool of US$5 million across regular season play, stage finals, and playoffs. By League rules, at least 50% of these winnings are split among the team's members, the remaining going to the team's owner.

Stage 1 Playoffs

Pos	Team	Bonus
1	Vancouver Titans	$200,000
2	San Francisco Shock	$100,000
3	Philadelphia Fusion	$50,000
4	Seoul Dynasty	$50,000
5	New York Excelsior	$25,000
6	Toronto Defiant	$25,000
7	Atlanta Reign	$25,000
8	Boston Uprising	$25,000

Stage 2 Playoffs

Pos	Team	Bonus
1	San Francisco Shock	$200,000
2	Vancouver Titans	$100,000
3	New York Excelsior	$50,000
4	Hangzhou Spark	$50,000
5	London Spitfire	$25,000
6	Los Angeles Gladiators	$25,000
7	Dallas Fuel	$25,000
8	Shanghai Dragons	$25,000

Stage 3 Playoffs

Pos	Team	Bonus
1	Shanghai Dragons	$200,000
2	San Francisco Shock	$100,000
3	Vancouver Titans	$50,000
4	Los Angeles Valiant	$50,000
5	New York Excelsior	$25,000
6	Hangzhou Spark	$25,000
7	Seoul Dynasty	$25,000
8	Houston Outlaws	$25,000

Season Playoffs

Pos	Team	Bonus
1	San Francisco Shock	$1,100,000
2	Vancouver Titans	$600,000
3	New York Excelsior	$450,000
4	Hangzhou Spark	$350,000
5	Los Angeles Gladiators	$300,000
6	Atlanta Reign	$300,000
7	London Spitfire	$200,000
8	Seoul Dynasty	$200,000
