= 2019 Washington Justice season =

- Head coach: Kim Hyeong-seok
- General manager: Analynn Dang
- Owner: Mark Ein
- Division: Atlantic

Results
- Record: 8–20 (.286)
- Place: Atlantic: 8th; League: 17th
- Stage 1 Playoffs: Did not qualify
- Stage 2 Playoffs: Did not qualify
- Stage 3 Playoffs: Did not qualify
- Season Playoffs: Did not qualify

The 2019 Washington Justice season was the first season of Washington Justice's existence in the Overwatch League as one of eight expansion franchises added for the 2019 season. The Justice struggled throughout the first three stages of the season, posting a 2–19 record in the first 21 games. However, the Justice flourished after the League's implementation of an enforced 2-2-2 role lock for Stage 4, as the team lost only one match in their final seven games to finish the season in 17th place with an 8–20 record.

== Preceding offseason ==
On September 12, Washington announced the signing of former New York Excelsior coach Kim "WizardHyeong" Hyeong-seok as the team's head coach. Eight days later, Washington signed Molly "AVALLA" Kim as an analyst; AVALLA is the first female coach to be signed in the history of the Overwatch League. Justice announced its inaugural season starting roster between September and December, consisting of the following players:

- Song "Janus" Junhwa,
- Kim "Sansam" Hyang-ki,
- Ethan "Stratus" Yankel,
- Corey "Corey" Nigra,
- Chon "Ado" Gi-hyeon,
- Moon "Gido" Gi-do,
- Riley "Fahzix" Taylor, and
- Cho "Hyeonu" Hyeon-woo.

== Regular season ==
The Justice's first regular season match was against the New York Excelsior on February 16; Washington lost the series 1–3. The team lost their first six matches of the season. Washington's final match of Stage 1 was against the Florida Mayhem on March 17; the Justice won 3–2, giving the franchise their first-ever win, and ended the stage with a 1–6 record. The following day, the Justice acquired support player Hong "ArK" Yeon-jun from New York Excelsior.

On April 19, in the middle of Stage 2, the Justice acquired support Nikola "Sleepy" Andrews from the San Francisco Shock. In Stage 2, the Justice again lost their first six matches. Their final match of Stage 2 was against the Boston Uprising. Washing took a 3–2 win and finished Stage 2 with a 1–6 record.

In Stage 3, week 2, the Justice faced the Hangzhou Spark on June 15. In the match, Washington was handed one of the most dominant map losses in the history of the Overwatch League on Hollywood, as the team only secured two eliminations in the entire map. The Justice lost all seven of their matches in Stage 3.

Prior to the start of Stage 4, which would include the implementation of an enforced 2-2-2 role lock by the League, the Justice signed tanks Elliot "ELLIVOTE" Vaneryd and Lukas "LullSiSH" Wiklund from the Dallas Fuel's academy team Team Envy. The Justice's first match of Stage 4 was against the Toronto Defiant on July 26; Washington came out of the match with a 3–1 victory, ending their seven-game losing streak. The following week, the team took on the league-leading Vancouver Titans. In a major upset, the Justice handed the Titans their first ever 0–4 loss and only their second loss in the entire regular season. DPS Corey "Corey" Nigra led the Justice throughout the match and broke the Overwatch League record for critical hit accuracy while playing as the hero Hanzo. The team continued to thrive under the 2-2-2 rule, going undefeated in their first four matches of the stage. The winning streak increased to five after defeating the Houston Outlaws on August 11. The Justice's first loss of the stage was on August 16 against the Atlanta Reign. The team's final match of the regular season was against the Paris Eternal two days later; Washington won 3–1.

== Final roster ==
2019 Washington Justice roster
Players
Coaches

Role	No.	Handle	Name	Nationality
Damage	11	Corey	Nigra, Corey	United States
Damage	27	Stratus	Yankel, Ethan	United States
Damage	99	Ado	Chon Gi-hyeon	South Korea
Tank	33	Sansam	Kim Hyang-ki	South Korea
Tank	39	Janus	Song Jun-hwa	South Korea
Tank	15	LullSiSH (I)	Wiklund, Lukas	Sweden
Tank	28	ELLIVOTE (I)	Vaneryd, Elliot	Sweden
Support	0	sleepy	Andrews, Nikola	United States
Support	2	ArK	Hong Yeon-jun	South Korea
Support	13	Gido	Moon Gi-do	South Korea
Support	23	Hyeonu	Cho Hyeon-woo	South Korea

Head coach

- Kim Hyeong-seok

Legend:
- (I) Inactive
- (S) Suspended
- (2W) Two-way player
- Substitute
- (injured) Injury / Illness

Latest roster transaction: August 12, 2019.

=== Transactions ===
Transactions of/for players on the roster during the 2019 regular season:

- On March 18, Justice acquired Hong "ArK Yeon-jun from New York Excelsior.
- On April 19, Justice acquired Nikola "Sleepy" Andrews from San Francisco Shock.
- On July 14, Justice signed Elliot "ELLIVOTE" Vaneryd and Lukas "LullSiSH" Wiklund.
- On August 12, Justice released Riley "Fahzix" Taylor.

== Standings ==
=== Record by stage ===
Stage	Pld	W	L	Pct	MW	ML	MT	MD	Pos
1	7	1	6	.143	9	20	1	-11	18
2	7	1	6	.143	8	21	0	-13	18
3	7	0	7	.000	2	22	4	-20	19
4 (Note: No stage playoffs were held for Stage 4.)	7	6	1	.857	20	9	1	+11	4
Overall	28	8	20	.286	39	72	6	-33	17
Qualified for playoffs • Qualified for play-in tournament

=== League ===
Pos	Div	Team	Pld	W	L	PCT	MW	ML	MT	MD	Qualification
1	PAC	Vancouver Titans	28	25	3	0.893	89	28	0	+61	Advance to season playoffs (division leaders)
2	ATL	New York Excelsior	28	22	6	0.786	78	38	3	+40	Advance to season playoffs (division leaders)
3	PAC	San Francisco Shock	28	23	5	0.821	92	26	0	+66	Advance to season playoffs
4	PAC	Hangzhou Spark	28	18	10	0.643	64	52	4	+12	Advance to season playoffs
5	PAC	Los Angeles Gladiators	28	17	11	0.607	67	48	3	+19	Advance to season playoffs
6	ATL	Atlanta Reign	28	16	12	0.571	69	50	1	+19	Advance to season playoffs
7	ATL	London Spitfire	28	16	12	0.571	58	52	6	+6	Advance to play-ins
8	PAC	Seoul Dynasty	28	15	13	0.536	64	50	3	+14	Advance to play-ins
9	PAC	Guangzhou Charge	28	15	13	0.536	61	57	1	+4	Advance to play-ins
10	ATL	Philadelphia Fusion	28	15	13	0.536	57	60	3	−3	Advance to play-ins
11	PAC	Shanghai Dragons	28	13	15	0.464	51	61	3	−10	Advance to play-ins
12	PAC	Chengdu Hunters	28	13	15	0.464	55	66	1	−11	Advance to play-ins
13	PAC	Los Angeles Valiant	28	12	16	0.429	56	61	4	−5	
14	ATL	Paris Eternal	28	11	17	0.393	46	67	3	−21	
15	PAC	Dallas Fuel	28	10	18	0.357	43	70	3	−27	
16	ATL	Houston Outlaws	28	9	19	0.321	47	69	3	−22	
17	ATL	Toronto Defiant	28	8	20	0.286	39	72	4	−33	
18	ATL	Washington Justice	28	8	20	0.286	39	72	6	−33	
19	ATL	Boston Uprising	28	8	20	0.286	41	78	2	−37	
20	ATL	Florida Mayhem	28	6	22	0.214	36	75	5	−39	

Source: The Overwatch League
Rules for classification: 1) winning percentage; 2) map differential; 3) head-to-head record; 4) head-to-head map differential

== Game log ==
2019 game log (Regular season record: 8–20)
Stage 1 (1–6)

1	February 16	Washington Justice	1	–	3	New York Excelsior	Burbank, CA
		Recap					Blizzard Arena
		0	Ilios			2	
		0	King's Row			1	
		1	Horizon Lunar Colony			0	
		1	Rialto			2	

2	February 21	Washington Justice	2	–	3	London Spitfire	Burbank, CA
		Recap					Blizzard Arena
		2	Busan			1	
		3	Numbani			2	
		2	Horizon Lunar Colony			4	
		2	Rialto			3	
		0	Nepal			2	

3	February 28	Washington Justice	1	–	3	Philadelphia Fusion	Burbank, CA
		Recap					Blizzard Arena
		2	Ilios			1	
		1	Hollywood			2	
		3	Temple of Anubis			4	
		1	Route 66			3	

4	March 02	San Francisco Shock	4	–	0	Washington Justice	Burbank, CA
		Recap					Blizzard Arena
		2	Nepal			1	
		3	Numbani			2	
		2	Temple of Anubis			0	
		3	Route 66			1	

5	March 09	Seoul Dynasty	3	–	1	Washington Justice	Burbank, CA
		Recap					Blizzard Arena
		2	Busan			0	
		4	Hollywood			3	
		3	Temple of Anubis			2	
		3	Dorado			4	

6	March 16	Washington Justice	1	–	2	Paris Eternal	Burbank, CA
		Recap					Blizzard Arena
		0	Busan			2	
		3	King's Row			3	
		3	Volskaya Industries			2	
		2	Dorado			3	

7	March 17	Washington Justice	3	–	2	Florida Mayhem	Burbank, CA
		Recap					Blizzard Arena
		2	Nepal			1	
		3	Hollywood			2	
		4	Volskaya Industries			5	
		4	Dorado			5	
		2	Ilios			1	

Stage 2 (1–6)

8	April 05	Washington Justice	1	–	3	Toronto Defiant	Burbank, CA
	5:45 pm PST	Recap					Blizzard Arena
		0	Lijang Tower			2	
		0	Hanamura			1	
		2	Eichenwalde			3	
		3	Watchpoint: Gibraltar			2	

9	April 07	Washington Justice	1	–	3	Chengdu Hunters	Burbank, CA
	5:15 pm PST	Recap					Blizzard Arena
		0	Oasis			2	
		1	Temple of Anubis			0	
		0	King's Row			1	
		3	Watchpoint: Gibraltar			4	

10	April 11	New York Excelsior	4	–	0	Washington Justice	Burbank, CA
	5:30 pm PST	Recap					Blizzard Arena
		2	Lijiang Tower			0	
		3	Hanamura			2	
		3	Eichenwalde			1	
		3	Junkertown			2	

11	April 14	Atlanta Reign	3	–	1	Washington Justice	Burbank, CA
	1:30 pm PST	Recap					Blizzard Arena
		2	Busan			0	
		0	Paris			1	
		2	Eichenwalde			1	
		4	Rialto			3	

12	April 19	Los Angeles Valiant	3	–	1	Washington Justice	Burbank, CA
	7:00 pm PST	Recap					Blizzard Arena
		2	Oasis			0	
		3	Temple of Anubis			4	
		3	King's Row			2	
		3	Rialto			0	

13	May 03	Shanghai Dragons	3	–	1	Washington Justice	Burbank, CA
	8:30 pm PST	Recap					Blizzard Arena
		2	Busan			0	
		2	Paris			1	
		0	Blizzard World			1	
		2	Watchpoint: Gibraltar			1	

14	May 05	Washington Justice	3	–	2	Boston Uprising	Burbank, CA
	1:30 pm PST	Details					Blizzard Arena
		0	Lijiang Tower			2	
		0	Temple of Anubis			2	
		2	Blizzard World			1	
		4	Rialto			3	
		2	Busan			1	

Stage 3 (0–7)

15	June 09	Washington Justice	0	–	3	Dallas Fuel	Burbank, CA
	3:30 pm PST	Details					Blizzard Arena
		0	Oasis			2	
		4	Volskaya Industries			4	
		2	Eichenwalde			3	
		0	Havana			3	

16	June 15	Washington Justice	0	–	3	Hangzhou Spark	Burbank, CA
	12:00 noon PST	Details					Blizzard Arena
		0	Ilios			2	
		1	Paris			1	
		0	Hollywood			3	
		0	Watchpoint: Gibraltar			3	

17	June 16	Washington Justice	0	–	4	Los Angeles Gladiators	Burbank, CA
	5:15 pm PST	Details					Blizzard Arena
		0	Nepal			2	
		0	Horizon Lunar Colony			2	
		0	Numbani			1	
		1	Havana			3	

18	June 22	London Spitfire	2	–	1	Washington Justice	Burbank, CA
	12:00 noon PST	Details					Blizzard Arena
		1	Nepal			2	
		2	Paris			2	
		4	Numbani			3	
		4	Dorado			3	

19	June 28	Houston Outlaws	3	–	0	Washington Justice	Burbank, CA
	9:00 pm PST	Details					Blizzard Arena
		2	Oasis			0	
		4	Volskaya Industries			4	
		3	Eichenwalde			2	
		1	Dorado			0	

20	July 06	Philadelphia Fusion	3	–	1	Washington Justice	Atlanta, GA
	10:15 am PST	Details					Cobb Energy Center
		1	Ilios			2	
		3	Horizon Lunar Colony			2	
		3	Hollywood			1	
		3	Watchpoint: Gibraltar			2	

21	July 07	Washington Justice	0	–	4	Guangzhou Charge	Atlanta, GA
	11:00 am PST	Details					Cobb Energy Center
		1	Nepal			2	
		0	Volskaya Industries			2	
		0	Eichenwalde			3	
		2	Watchpoint: Gibraltar			3	

Stage 4 (6–1)

22	July 26	Toronto Defiant	1	–	3	Washington Justice	Burbank, CA
	4:00 pm PST	Details					Blizzard Arena
		1	Busan			2	
		2	Temple of Anubis			1	
		1	Blizzard World			2	
		2	Havana			3	

23	August 01	Florida Mayhem	2	–	3	Washington Justice	Burbank, CA
	5:45 pm PST	Details					Blizzard Arena
		2	Busan			1	
		2	Volskaya Industries			0	
		1	King's Row			2	
		0	Havana			3	
		0	Ilios			2	

24	August 04	Vancouver Titans	0	–	4	Washington Justice	Burbank, CA
	3:30 pm PST	Details					Blizzard Arena
		0	Ilios			2	
		1	Volskaya Industries			2	
		3	Hollywood			4	
		0	Havana			3	

25	August 09	Boston Uprising	1	–	3	Washington Justice	Burbank, CA
	4:00 pm PST	Details					Blizzard Arena
		1	Lijiang Tower			2	
		1	Temple of Anubis			2	
		2	Blizzard World			1	
		1	Route 66			2	

26	August 11	Washington Justice	3	–	2	Houston Outlaws	Burbank, CA
	1:45 pm PST	Details					Blizzard Arena
		1	Lijiang Tower			2	
		2	Hanamura			1	
		1	King's Row			2	
		3	Route 66			2	
		2	Busan			1	

27	August 16	Washington Justice	1	–	2	Atlanta Reign	Burbank, CA
	4:00 pm PST	Details					Blizzard Arena
		1	Busan			2	
		1	Hanamura			1	
		1	Hollywood			0	
		2	Junkertown			3	

28	August 18	Paris Eternal	1	–	3	Washington Justice	Burbank, CA
	1:45 pm PST	Details					Blizzard Arena
		1	Ilios			2	
		1	Hanamura			2	
		6	King's Row			5	
		1	Junkertown			2	
