= 2019 Toronto Defiant season =

- Head coach: Lee Beom-joon (rel. Aug. 7)
- General manager: Won Jae-sun
- Owner: Chris Overholt
- Division: Atlantic

Results
- Record: 8–20 (.286)
- Place: Atlantic: 7th; League: 17th
- Stage 1 Playoffs: Quarterfinals
- Stage 2 Playoffs: Did not qualify
- Stage 3 Playoffs: Did not qualify
- Season Playoffs: Did not qualify
- Total Earnings: $25,000

The 2019 Toronto Defiant season was the first season of Toronto Defiant's existence in the Overwatch League as one of eight expansion franchises added for the 2019 season. After posting a 5–2 record in Stage 1, the Defiant qualified for the Stage 1 Playoffs, but a 0–3 loss against the Shock eliminated the team in the quarterfinals. The team failed to recreate the success they found in Stage 1 in the following stages, going 2–5, 0–7, and 1–6 in Stages 2, 3, and 4, respectively. A 2–3 loss to the Fusion on August 4 officially eliminated Toronto from postseason contention, and three days later, the team released head coach Lee "Bishop" Beom-joon. Despite numerous roster changes throughout the season, the Defiant finished the season in 17th place overall with an 8–20 record.

== Preceding offseason ==
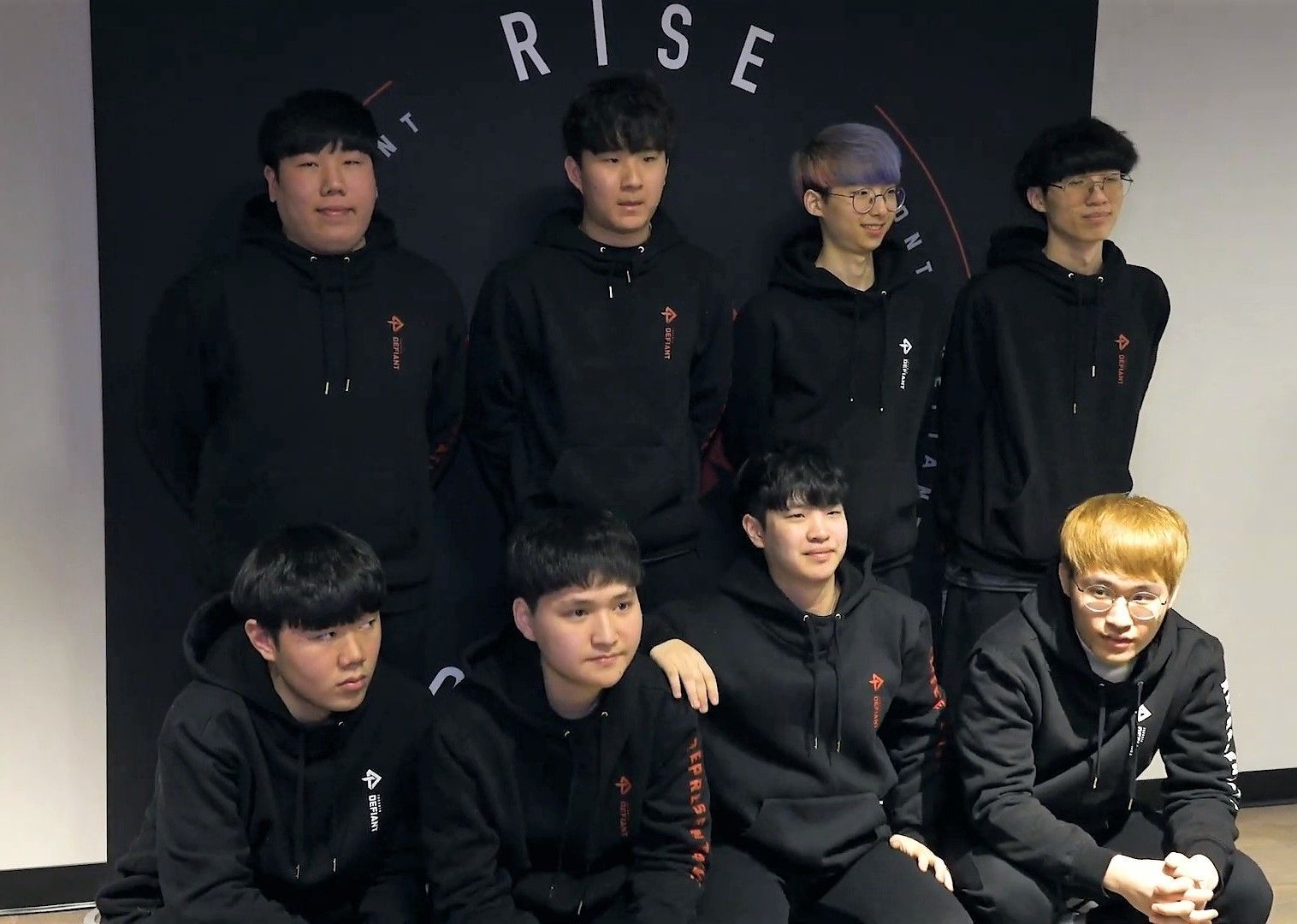
The roster of Toronto Defiant at the beginning of the 2019 Overwatch League season: Left to right, top to bottom: Aid, envy, RoKy, Neko, Ivy, Yakpung, Asher, Stellar.

Toronto announced their initial inaugural season roster over a span from October 27 to November 27; the team's roster consisted of the following players:

- Lee "envy" Kang-Jae,
- Park "Neko" Se-hyeon,
- Lee "ivy" Seung-hyun,
- Lee "Stellar" Do-hyung,
- Jo "Yakpung" Gyeong-mu,
- Ko "Aid" Jae-yoon,
- Choi "Asher" Jun-sung, and
- Park "RoKy" Joo-seong.

== Regular season ==
The Defiant opened their 2019 season with a match against the Houston Outlaws on February 15; Toronto won the match 3–2. Toronto finished Stage 1 with a 5–2 record and secured a Stage 1 Playoff berth. At the end of Stage 1, the Defiant were tied with the Philadelphia Fusion for the third seed of the Stage 1 Playoffs. By rule, the teams would have to compete in an offline match to determine seeding; however, both teams agreed on a coin-flip, instead. The Defiant received the third seed and faced sixth-seeded San Francisco Shock in the quarterfinals on March 22. The Defiant lost the series 0–3.

A few days prior to the beginning of Stage 2, Toronto Defiant parted ways with their strategic coach Kim "Don" Dong-wook. A day later, DPS player Lee "Stellar" Do-hyung retired from professional Overwatch for personal reasons. To take his place, Defiant signed Jin "im37" Hong, who had been playing Overwatch professionally for only just over a month, hours before the beginning of Stage 2. In Stage 2, Toronto faced the undefeated Vancouver Titans on May 3. The Defiant lost the series 1–3, putting the team on a five-game losing streak. The loss also officially eliminated them from Stage 2 Playoff contention. The team's final match of Stage 2 was against the Paris Eternal. Toronto went on to win, 4–0, marking their first sweep of the season.

There were more roster changes for Toronto heading into Stage 3. Both tank Daniel "Gods" Graeser and tank Normunds "sharyk" Faterins were moved up from the Defiant's academy team Montreal Rebellion in mid-May. The Defiant also had another roster member leave, as Choi "Asher" Joon-seong retired from competitive Overwatch on May 29. In the middle of Stage 3, Toronto transferred off-tank Lee "envy" Kang-jae, who had not played in a match since Stage 2, to the Shanghai Dragons on June 18. More roster transactions took place the following week, as the team promoted veteran DPS Andreas "Logix" Berghmans from the Montreal Rebellion and signed DPS Liam "Mangachu" Campbell, who had played for Team Canada in the 2017 and 2018 Overwatch World Cup. Toronto performed poorly throughout the stage, losing all seven of their matches.

Toronto snapped their nine-game losing streak on August 1, after defeating the Stage 3 Champions Shanghai Dragons, 2–1. The Defiant faced the Philadelphia Fusion three days later, but the team was unable to scrim prior to the match due to an upper-management decision to send Daniel "Gods" Graeser and Go "Aid" Jae-yoon to a media event in Toronto. Toronto lost the match against Philadelphia by a score of 2–3; the loss officially eliminated the Defiant from postseason contention. Following the loss, on August 7, the Defiant released head coach Lee "Bishop" Beom-joon and announced that assistant coach May "Optidox" Sims, assistant coach Shim "Mobydik" Seung-bo, and analyst Dennis "Barroi" Matz would be taking on the role of head coaches by committee for the remainder of the season. Toronto finished the season in 17th place with a 8–20 record.

== Final roster ==
2019 Toronto Defiant roster
Players
Coaches

Role	No.	Handle	Name	Nationality
Damage	2	Ivy	Lee Seung-hyun	South Korea
Damage	37	im37	Hong Jin-ui	South Korea
Damage	22	Logix	Andreas Berghmans	Belgium
Damage	51	Mangachu	Liam Campbell	Canada
Tank	1	Yakpung	Jo Gyeong-mu	South Korea
Tank	11	Gods	Daniel Graeser	United States
Tank	77	sharyk	Normunds Faterins	Latvia
Support	6	Aid	Ko Jae-yoon	South Korea
Support	7	RoKy	Park Joo-seong	South Korea
Support	79	Neko	Park Se-hyeon	South Korea

Head coach

- Vacant

Legend:
- (I) Inactive
- (S) Suspended
- (2W) Two-way player
- Substitute
- (injured) Injury / Illness

Latest roster transaction: June 28, 2019.

=== Transactions ===
Transactions of/for players on the roster during the 2019 regular season:

- On April 3, Lee "Stellar" Do-hyung retired.
- On April 4, Defiant signed Jin "im37" Hong.
- On May 21, Defiant promoted Daniel "Gods" Graeser and Normunds "sharyk" Faterins from Montreal Rebellion.
- On May 29, Choi "Asher" Jun-sung retired.
- On June 18, Defiant transferred Lee "envy" Kang-jae to Shanghai Dragons.
- On June 28, Defiant promoted Andreas "Logix" Berghmans from Montreal Rebellion.
- On June 28, Defiant signed Liam "Mangachu" Campbell.
- On July 15, Defiant transferred Lee "Stellar" Do-hyung to Boston Uprising.

== Standings ==
=== Record by stage ===
Stage	Pld	W	L	Pct	MW	ML	MT	MD	Pos
1	7	5	2	.714	16	11	2	+5	3
2	7	2	5	.286	11	18	0	-7	15
3	7	0	7	.000	4	24	0	-20	19
4 (Note: No stage playoffs were held for Stage 4.)	7	1	6	.143	8	19	2	-11	17
Overall	28	8	20	.286	39	72	4	-33	17
Qualified for playoffs • Qualified for play-in tournament

=== League ===
Pos	Div	Team	Pld	W	L	PCT	MW	ML	MT	MD	Qualification
1	PAC	Vancouver Titans	28	25	3	0.893	89	28	0	+61	Advance to season playoffs (division leaders)
2	ATL	New York Excelsior	28	22	6	0.786	78	38	3	+40	Advance to season playoffs (division leaders)
3	PAC	San Francisco Shock	28	23	5	0.821	92	26	0	+66	Advance to season playoffs
4	PAC	Hangzhou Spark	28	18	10	0.643	64	52	4	+12	Advance to season playoffs
5	PAC	Los Angeles Gladiators	28	17	11	0.607	67	48	3	+19	Advance to season playoffs
6	ATL	Atlanta Reign	28	16	12	0.571	69	50	1	+19	Advance to season playoffs
7	ATL	London Spitfire	28	16	12	0.571	58	52	6	+6	Advance to play-ins
8	PAC	Seoul Dynasty	28	15	13	0.536	64	50	3	+14	Advance to play-ins
9	PAC	Guangzhou Charge	28	15	13	0.536	61	57	1	+4	Advance to play-ins
10	ATL	Philadelphia Fusion	28	15	13	0.536	57	60	3	−3	Advance to play-ins
11	PAC	Shanghai Dragons	28	13	15	0.464	51	61	3	−10	Advance to play-ins
12	PAC	Chengdu Hunters	28	13	15	0.464	55	66	1	−11	Advance to play-ins
13	PAC	Los Angeles Valiant	28	12	16	0.429	56	61	4	−5	
14	ATL	Paris Eternal	28	11	17	0.393	46	67	3	−21	
15	PAC	Dallas Fuel	28	10	18	0.357	43	70	3	−27	
16	ATL	Houston Outlaws	28	9	19	0.321	47	69	3	−22	
17	ATL	Toronto Defiant	28	8	20	0.286	39	72	4	−33	
18	ATL	Washington Justice	28	8	20	0.286	39	72	6	−33	
19	ATL	Boston Uprising	28	8	20	0.286	41	78	2	−37	
20	ATL	Florida Mayhem	28	6	22	0.214	36	75	5	−39	

Source: The Overwatch League
Rules for classification: 1) winning percentage; 2) map differential; 3) head-to-head record; 4) head-to-head map differential

== Game log ==
=== Regular season ===
2019 game log (Regular season record: 8–20)
Stage 1 (5–2)

1	February 15	Toronto Defiant	3	–	2	Houston Outlaws	Burbank, CA
		Recap					Blizzard Arena
		1	Nepal			2	
		4	Numbani			5	
		1	Volskaya Industries			0	
		2	Route 66			1	
		2	Busan			1	

2	February 22	Atlanta Reign	3	–	1	Toronto Defiant	Burbank, CA
		Recap					Blizzard Arena
		1	Busan			2	
		2	Numbani			1	
		6	Horizon Lunar Colony			4	
		3	Dorado			0	

3	February 24	Toronto Defiant	2	–	1	Los Angeles Valiant	Burbank, CA
		Recap					Blizzard Arena
		2	Ilios			1	
		3	Hollywood			3	
		4	Horizon Lunar Colony			3	
		2	Dorado			3	

4	March 01	Toronto Defiant	1	–	3	New York Excelsior	Burbank, CA
		Recap					Blizzard Arena
		1	Busan			2	
		2	King's Row			3	
		1	Temple of Anubis			2	
		3	Dorado			0	

5	March 03	Boston Uprising	1	–	3	Toronto Defiant	Burbank, CA
		Recap					Blizzard Arena
		0	Busan			2	
		2	Hollywood			3	
		4	Temple of Anubis			2	
		1	Rialto			2	

6	March 07	Toronto Defiant	3	–	1	Chengdu Hunters	Burbank, CA
		Recap					Blizzard Arena
		2	Ilios			1	
		1	King's Row			0	
		2	Volskaya Industries			3	
		3	Route 66			2	

7	March 09	Hangzhou Spark	0	–	3	Toronto Defiant	Burbank, CA
		Recap					Blizzard Arena
		1	Nepal			2	
		1	King's Row			3	
		2	Volskaya Industries			2	
		3	Rialto			4	

Stage 1 Playoffs

Quarterfinals	March 22	San Francisco Shock	3	–	0	Toronto Defiant	Burbank, CA
	8:00 pm PST	Recap					Blizzard Arena
		2	Busan			1	
		3	King's Row			0	
		3	Horizon Lunar Colony			2	

Stage 2 (2–5)

8	April 05	Washington Justice	1	–	3	Toronto Defiant	Burbank, CA
	5:45 pm PST	Recap					Blizzard Arena
		0	Lijang Tower			2	
		0	Hanamura			1	
		2	Eichenwalde			3	
		3	Watchpoint: Gibraltar			2	

9	April 06	Toronto Defiant	2	–	3	Boston Uprising	Burbank, CA
	1:45 pm PST	Recap					Blizzard Arena
		2	Busan			0	
		4	Hanamura			3	
		1	Eichenwalde			3	
		0	Rialto			1	
		1	Oasis			2	

10	April 11	Toronto Defiant	1	–	3	Philadelphia Fusion	Burbank, CA
	8:30 pm PST	Recap					Blizzard Arena
		0	Busan			2	
		4	Paris			3	
		2	Blizzard World			3	
		2	Watchpoint: Gibraltar			3	

11	April 13	Dallas Fuel	4	–	0	Toronto Defiant	Burbank, CA
	3:00 pm PST	Recap					Blizzard Arena
		2	Oasis			0	
		5	Paris			4	
		3	King's Row			0	
		3	Rialto			2	

12	April 18	San Francisco Shock	4	–	0	Toronto Defiant	Burbank, CA
	5:30 pm PST	Recap					Blizzard Arena
		2	Lijiang Tower			0	
		2	Hanamura			1	
		2	Eichenwalde			1	
		3	Watchpoint: Gibraltar			0	

13	May 03	Toronto Defiant	1	–	3	Vancouver Titans	Burbank, CA
	7:00 pm PST	Recap					Blizzard Arena
		0	Oasis			2	
		2	Temple of Anubis			0	
		1	King's Row			2	
		2	Junkertown			3	

14	May 05	Toronto Defiant	4	–	0	Paris Eternal	Burbank, CA
	12:00 noon PST	Details					Blizzard Arena
		2	Lijiang Tower			1	
		2	Temple of Anubis			1	
		3	King's Row			2	
		6	Watchpoint: Gibraltar			5	

Stage 3 (0–7)

15	June 07	Paris Eternal	3	–	1	Toronto Defiant	Burbank, CA
	4:00 pm PST	Details					Blizzard Arena
		0	Ilios			2	
		1	Paris			0	
		2	Hollywood			1	
		3	Havana			2	

16	June 14	Toronto Defiant	1	–	3	London Spitfire	Burbank, CA
	5:45 pm PST	Details					Blizzard Arena
		2	Ilios			1	
		0	Volskaya Industries			1	
		3	Hollywood			4	
		2	Watchpoint: Gibraltar			3	

17	June 22	Toronto Defiant	0	–	4	Guangzhou Charge	Burbank, CA
	3:30 pm PST	Details					Blizzard Arena
		0	Ilios			2	
		2	Paris			4	
		0	Hollywood			3	
		0	Watchpoint: Gibraltar			3	

18	June 28	Toronto Defiant	0	–	4	Los Angeles Gladiators	Burbank, CA
	7:15 pm PST	Details					Blizzard Arena
		0	Nepal			2	
		1	Horizon Lunar Colony			2	
		3	Numbani			4	
		3	Dorado			4	

19	June 30	Houston Outlaws	3	–	1	Toronto Defiant	Burbank, CA
	3:30 pm PST	Details					Blizzard Arena
		0	Oasis			2	
		3	Horizon Lunar Colony			2	
		2	Eichenwalde			1	
		3	Dorado			1	

20	July 06	Toronto Defiant	1	–	3	Atlanta Reign	Atlanta, GA
	12:00 noon PST	Details					Cobb Energy Center
		0	Oasis			2	
		1	Volskaya Industries			0	
		3	Eichenwalde			4	
		2	Dorado			3	

21	July 07	New York Excelsior	4	–	0	Toronto Defiant	Atlanta, GA
	2:30 pm PST	Details					Cobb Energy Center
		2	Nepal			0	
		2	Horizon Lunar Colony			1	
		3	Numbani			2	
		1	Havana			0	

Stage 4 (1–6)

22	July 26	Toronto Defiant	1	–	3	Washington Justice	Burbank, CA
	4:00 pm PST	Details					Blizzard Arena
		1	Busan			2	
		2	Temple of Anubis			1	
		1	Blizzard World			2	
		2	Havana			3	

23	July 28	London Spitfire	3	–	1	Toronto Defiant	Burbank, CA
	1:45 pm PST	Details					Blizzard Arena
		0	Ilios			2	
		1	Temple of Anubis			0	
		3	Hollywood			0	
		3	Junkertown			2	

24	August 01	Shanghai Dragons	1	–	2	Toronto Defiant	Burbank, CA
	7:30 pm PST	Details					Blizzard Arena
		2	Lijiang Tower			1	
		1	Volskaya Industries			2	
		3	Hollywood			3	
		3	Route 66			4	

25	August 04	Philadelphia Fusion	3	–	2	Toronto Defiant	Burbank, CA
	1:45 pm PST	Details					Blizzard Arena
		2	Lijiang Tower			0	
		0	Volskaya Industries			1	
		0	King's Row			1	
		3	Havana			2	
		2	Busan			0	

26	August 08	Toronto Defiant	1	–	3	Florida Mayhem	Burbank, CA
	7:30 pm PST	Details					Blizzard Arena
		2	Ilios			0	
		1	Hanamura			2	
		1	King's Row			3	
		2	Havana			3	

27	August 10	Seoul Dynasty	2	–	1	Toronto Defiant	Burbank, CA
	1:45 pm PST	Details					Blizzard Arena
		2	Lijiang Tower			1	
		2	Volskaya Industries			2	
		4	Blizzard World			3	
		0	Junkertown			1	

28	August 18	Florida Mayhem	4	–	0	Toronto Defiant	Burbank, CA
	3:30 pm PST	Details					Blizzard Arena
		2	Busan			0	
		4	Hanamura			2	
		3	Blizzard World			1	
		6	Route 66			4	
