= 2019 Paris Eternal season =

- Head coach: Julien Ducros (rel. 2 Apr); Félix Münch
- General manager: Michael De Wit
- Owner: Drew McCourt
- Division: Atlantic

Results
- Record: 11–17 (.393)
- Place: Atlantic: 5th; League: 14th
- Stage 1 Playoffs: Did not qualify
- Stage 2 Playoffs: Did not qualify
- Stage 3 Playoffs: Did not qualify
- Season Playoffs: Did not qualify

The 2019 Paris Eternal season was the first season of Paris Eternal's existence in the Overwatch League. The team was one of eight expansion franchises added for the 2019 season. After the team posted a 3–4 record in Stage 1, head coach Julien Ducros left the team and was replaced by Félix Münch. Paris ended the season with a disappointing 11–17 record, did not manage to yield a winning record in any stage, and did not qualify for any of the stage playoffs nor the season playoffs.

== Preceding offseason ==
On 23 October, Eternal announced their entirely European roster, consisting of the following players:

- Karol "danye" Szcześniak,
- Nicolas "NiCOgdh" Moret,
- Georgii "ShaDowBurn" Gushcha,
- Terrence "SoOn" Tarlier,
- Finnbjorn "Finnsi" Jonasson,
- Benjamin "BenBest" Dieulafait,
- Roni "LhCloudy" Tiihonen,
- Damien "HyP" Souville, and
- Harrison "Kruise" Pond.

On 8 November, Eternal revealed their entirely European coaching staff. On 28 November, Eternal signed support player Luís "Greyy" Perestrelo.

== Regular season ==
Eternal's first-ever Overwatch League match was against the 2018 Overwatch League Grand Finals champions London Spitfire on 16 February; Paris won the match 3–1. The team finished Stage 1 with a 3–4 record and did not qualify for the Stage 1 playoffs.

Two days before Stage 2 began, head coach Julien "daemoN" Ducros stepped down from his position. He was replaced the next day, as the Eternal promoted player development coach Félix "Féfé" Münch to head coach. In week four, Paris traveled to the Allen Event Center in Allen, Texas for the Dallas Fuel Homestand Weekend. The team first took on the London Spitfire in a rematch of their season opener on 20 April, which was delayed by an hour-long power outage. Paris swept by the Spitfire 0–4. The team finished the stage with a 2–5 record.

On 17 August, the Eternal defeated the Stage 3 Champions Shanghai Dragons; however, the Los Angeles Valiant won their match later that day, which officially eliminated the Eternal from qualifying for the postseason. The team closed out their season with a match against the Washington Justice a day later. In a match that had no playoff implications for either team, Paris lost 1–3, finishing their season with a 11–17 record.

== Final roster ==
2019 Paris Eternal roster
Players
Coaches

Role	No.	Handle	Name	Nationality
Damage	1	Danye	Szcześniak, Karol	Poland
Damage	10	NiCOgdh	Moret, Nicolas	France
Damage	13	ShaDowBurn	Gushcha, Georgii	Russia
Damage	99	SoOn	Tarlier, Terrence	France
Tank	8	Finnsi	Jonasson, Finnbjorn	Iceland
Tank	17	BenBest	Dieulafait, Benjamin	France
Tank	27	LhCloudy	Tiihonen, Roni	Finland
Support	7	HyP	Souville, Damien	France
Support	9	Kruise	Pond, Harrison	United Kingdom
Support	47	Greyy	Perestrelo, Luís	Portugal

Head coach

- Félix Münch

Legend:
- (I) Inactive
- (S) Suspended
- (2W) Two-way player
- Substitute
- (injured) Injury / Illness

Latest roster transaction: 14 April 2019.

== Standings ==
=== Record by stage ===
Stage	Pld	W	L	Pct	MW	ML	MT	MD	Pos
1	7	3	4	.429	9	17	2	-8	16
2	7	2	5	.286	10	18	1	-8	16
3	7	3	4	.429	14	15	0	-1	12
4 (Note: No stage playoffs were held for Stage 4.)	7	3	4	.429	13	17	0	-4	14
Overall	28	11	17	.393	46	67	3	-21	14
Qualified for playoffs • Qualified for play-in tournament

=== League ===
Pos	Div	Team	Pld	W	L	PCT	MW	ML	MT	MD	Qualification
1	PAC	Vancouver Titans	28	25	3	0.893	89	28	0	+61	Advance to season playoffs (division leaders)
2	ATL	New York Excelsior	28	22	6	0.786	78	38	3	+40	Advance to season playoffs (division leaders)
3	PAC	San Francisco Shock	28	23	5	0.821	92	26	0	+66	Advance to season playoffs
4	PAC	Hangzhou Spark	28	18	10	0.643	64	52	4	+12	Advance to season playoffs
5	PAC	Los Angeles Gladiators	28	17	11	0.607	67	48	3	+19	Advance to season playoffs
6	ATL	Atlanta Reign	28	16	12	0.571	69	50	1	+19	Advance to season playoffs
7	ATL	London Spitfire	28	16	12	0.571	58	52	6	+6	Advance to play-ins
8	PAC	Seoul Dynasty	28	15	13	0.536	64	50	3	+14	Advance to play-ins
9	PAC	Guangzhou Charge	28	15	13	0.536	61	57	1	+4	Advance to play-ins
10	ATL	Philadelphia Fusion	28	15	13	0.536	57	60	3	−3	Advance to play-ins
11	PAC	Shanghai Dragons	28	13	15	0.464	51	61	3	−10	Advance to play-ins
12	PAC	Chengdu Hunters	28	13	15	0.464	55	66	1	−11	Advance to play-ins
13	PAC	Los Angeles Valiant	28	12	16	0.429	56	61	4	−5	
14	ATL	Paris Eternal	28	11	17	0.393	46	67	3	−21	
15	PAC	Dallas Fuel	28	10	18	0.357	43	70	3	−27	
16	ATL	Houston Outlaws	28	9	19	0.321	47	69	3	−22	
17	ATL	Toronto Defiant	28	8	20	0.286	39	72	4	−33	
18	ATL	Washington Justice	28	8	20	0.286	39	72	6	−33	
19	ATL	Boston Uprising	28	8	20	0.286	41	78	2	−37	
20	ATL	Florida Mayhem	28	6	22	0.214	36	75	5	−39	

Source: The Overwatch League
Rules for classification: 1) winning percentage; 2) map differential; 3) head-to-head record; 4) head-to-head map differential

== Game log ==
2019 game log (Regular season record: 11–17)
Stage 1 (3–4)

1	16 February	London Spitfire	1	–	3	Paris Eternal	Burbank, CA
		Recap					Blizzard Arena
		0	Ilios			2	
		2	King's Row			1	
		2	Volskaya Industries			3	
		0	Route 66			3	

2	23 February	Los Angeles Gladiators	1	–	2	Paris Eternal	Burbank, CA
		Recap					Blizzard Arena
		2	Nepal			1	
		2	Numbani			3	
		3	Temple of Anubis			3	
		2	Dorado			3	

3	2 March	Paris Eternal	0	–	4	Atlanta Reign	Burbank, CA
		Recap					Blizzard Arena
		0	Ilios			2	
		1	Hollywood			3	
		0	Temple of Anubis			2	
		2	Route 66			3	

4	8 March	Paris Eternal	0	–	4	Vancouver Titans	Burbank, CA
		Recap					Blizzard Arena
		1	Ilios			2	
		2	Numbani			3	
		1	Horizon Lunar Colony			2	
		2	Rialto			3	

5	10 March	Paris Eternal	1	–	3	San Francisco Shock	Burbank, CA
		Recap					Blizzard Arena
		0	Nepal			2	
		1	Hollywood			3	
		2	Horizon Lunar Colony			3	
		2	Dorado			0	

6	16 March	Washington Justice	1	–	2	Paris Eternal	Burbank, CA
		Recap					Blizzard Arena
		0	Busan			2	
		3	King's Row			3	
		3	Volskaya Industries			2	
		2	Dorado			3	

7	17 March	Philadelphia Fusion	3	–	1	Paris Eternal	Burbank, CA
		Recap					Blizzard Arena
		1	Busan			2	
		3	King's Row			2	
		1	Horizon Lunar Colony			0	
		3	Rialto			0	

Stage 2 (2–5)

8	4 April	Guangzhou Charge	0	–	4	Paris Eternal	Burbank, CA
	9:05 pm PST	Recap					Blizzard Arena
		0	Oasis			2	
		0	Paris			2	
		2	Eichenwalde			3	
		2	Junkertown			3	

9	6 April	Chengdu Hunters	4	–	0	Paris Eternal	Burbank, CA
	5:15 pm PST	Recap					Blizzard Arena
		2	Oasis			1	
		4	Hanamura			3	
		4	Blizzard World			3	
		2	Rialto			1	

10	11 April	Paris Eternal	3	–	1	Florida Mayhem	Burbank, CA
	4:00 pm PST	Details					Blizzard Arena
		2	Oasis			0	
		4	Hanamura			3	
		3	Blizzard World			2	
		1	Watchpoint: Gibraltar			2	

11	14 April	Dallas Fuel	2	–	1	Paris Eternal	Burbank, CA
	12:00 noon PST	Recap					Blizzard Arena
		2	Busan			0	
		2	Paris			2	
		4	Blizzard World			3	
		1	Rialto			2	

12	27 April	Paris Eternal	0	–	4	London Spitfire	Allen, TX
	9:00 am PST	Recap					Allen Event Center
		0	Busan			2	
		1	Temple of Anubis			2	
		4	King's Row			5	
		1	Junkertown			3	

13	28 April	Hangzhou Spark	3	–	2	Paris Eternal	Allen, TX
	10:00 am PST	Details					Allen Event Center
		2	Lijiang Tower			1	
		2	Temple of Anubis			3	
		5	Eichenwalde			6	
		3	Junkertown			2	
		2	Busan			0	

14	5 May	Toronto Defiant	4	–	0	Paris Eternal	Burbank, CA
	12:00 noon PST	Recap					Blizzard Arena
		2	Lijiang Tower			1	
		2	Temple of Anubis			1	
		3	King's Row			2	
		6	Watchpoint: Gibraltar			5	

Stage 3 (3–4)

15	7 June	Paris Eternal	3	–	1	Toronto Defiant	Burbank, CA
	4:00 pm PST	Details					Blizzard Arena
		0	Ilios			2	
		1	Paris			0	
		2	Hollywood			1	
		3	Havana			2	

16	9 June	Paris Eternal	3	–	1	Boston Uprising	Burbank, CA
	1:45 pm PST	Details					Blizzard Arena
		0	Ilios			2	
		5	Paris			4	
		3	Eichenwalde			2	
		4	Watchpoint: Gibraltar			3	

17	14 June	Paris Eternal	1	–	3	New York Excelsior	Burbank, CA
	4:00 pm PST	Details					Blizzard Arena
		1	Nepal			2	
		0	Volskaya Industries			2	
		1	Numbani			3	
		2	Dorado			1	

18	16 June	Florida Mayhem	1	–	3	Paris Eternal	Burbank, CA
	1:45 pm PST	Details					Blizzard Arena
		0	Nepal			2	
		4	Horizon Lunar Colony			5	
		1	Numbani			0	
		2	Havana			3	

19	20 June	Paris Eternal	1	–	3	Houston Outlaws	Burbank, CA
	5:45 pm PST	Details					Blizzard Arena
		0	Oasis			2	
		2	Paris			4	
		2	Hollywood			1	
		1	Dorado			2	

20	23 June	Boston Uprising	3	–	2	Paris Eternal	Burbank, CA
	1:45 pm PST	Details					Blizzard Arena
		0	Oasis			2	
		1	Volskaya Industries			2	
		5	Eichenwalde			4	
		3	Dorado			2	
		2	Nepal			0	

21	27 June	Paris Eternal	1	–	3	Seoul Dynasty	Burbank, CA
	7:15 pm PST	Details					Blizzard Arena
		1	Nepal			2	
		2	Horizon Lunar Colony			3	
		3	Eichenwalde			4	
		5	Watchpoint: Gibraltar			4	

Stage 4 (3–4)

22	25 July	Houston Outlaws	1	–	3	Paris Eternal	Burbank, CA
	4:00 pm PST	Details					Blizzard Arena
		2	Busan			0	
		0	Volskaya Industries			1	
		0	Blizzard World			3	
		2	Junkertown			3	

23	27 July	Paris Eternal	2	–	3	Los Angeles Valiant	Burbank, CA
	12:00 noon PST	Details					Blizzard Arena
		0	Lijiang Tower			2	
		1	Temple of Anubis			2	
		4	Blizzard World			3	
		5	Route 66			3	
		1	Busan			2	

24	2 August	New York Excelsior	3	–	1	Paris Eternal	Burbank, CA
	4:00 pm PST	Details					Blizzard Arena
		2	Busan			1	
		2	Volskaya Industries			0	
		3	King's Row			1	
		0	Havana			1	

25	3 August	Atlanta Reign	4	–	0	Paris Eternal	Burbank, CA
	12:00 noon PST	Details					Blizzard Arena
		2	Ilios			1	
		3	Temple of Anubis			2	
		3	Hollywood			2	
		5	Route 66			4	

26	8 August	Paris Eternal	3	–	2	Philadelphia Fusion	Burbank, CA
	5:45 pm PST	Details					Blizzard Arena
		1	Ilios			2	
		1	Temple of Anubis			2	
		2	Hollywood			1	
		3	Route 66			2	
		2	Lijiang Tower			1	

27	17 August	Paris Eternal	3	–	1	Shanghai Dragons	Burbank, CA
	12:00 noon PST	Details					Blizzard Arena
		2	Lijiang Tower			0	
		3	Hanamura			4	
		3	King's Row			2	
		3	Havana			2	

28	18 August	Paris Eternal	1	–	3	Washington Justice	Burbank, CA
	1:45 pm PST	Details					Blizzard Arena
		1	Ilios			2	
		1	Hanamura			2	
		6	King's Row			5	
		1	Junkertown			2	

== Awards ==
On 8 May, Harrison "Kruise" Pond was named as a reserve for the 2019 Overwatch League All-Star Game.
