= 2019 Los Angeles Gladiators season =

- Head coach: David Pei
- General manager: Kevin Jeon
- Owner: Stan Kroenke; Josh Kroenke
- Division: Pacific

Results
- Record: 17–11 (.607)
- Place: Pacific: 4th; League: 5th
- Stage 1 Playoffs: Did not qualify
- Stage 2 Playoffs: Quarterfinals
- Stage 3 Playoffs: Did not qualify
- Season Playoffs: Lower Round 2
- Total Earnings: $325,000

The 2019 Los Angeles Gladiators season was the second season of Los Angeles Gladiators's existence in the Overwatch League and their second season under head coach David "dpei" Pei. The Gladiators looked to improve upon their 2018 season, when they qualified for the season playoffs but fell in the quarterfinals to the London Spitfire.

Los Angeles struggled early on in the season, losing four of their first five matches, and did not qualify for the Stage 1 Playoffs. The team hit their stride in Stage 2 with a 6–1 record and claimed the fourth seed in the Stage 2 Playoffs; however, they lost in the quarterfinals to the New York Excelsior, 0–3. The Gladiators' performance dropped in Stage 3, as they were only able to amass a 4–3 for the stage and missed out on Stage 3 Playoffs by one spot. With the implementation of an enforced 2-2-2 role lock by the league in Stage 4, Los Angeles won three of their first six matches in the stage. The Gladiators closed out the season with a 3–1 victory over the Los Angeles Valiant at the Valiant's homestand weekend at The Novo, giving the team an 18–11 overall record and the fifth seed in the season playoffs.

The Gladiators began their playoff run with a 4–3 victory over the Hangzhou Spark in the first round, marking the team's first ever playoff series win, including stage playoffs, in franchise history. The win advanced the team to the first round in the upper bracket, but they fell 2–4 to the Vancouver Titans, sending them to the lower bracket. Los Angeles' season came to an end the following match, when they were swept 0–4 by the San Francisco Shock.

== Preceding offseason ==
=== Player re-signings ===
From August 1 to September 9, 2018, all Overwatch League teams that competed in the 2018 season could choose to extend their team's players' contracts. On August 20, Gladiators transferred main tank Baek "Fissure" Chan-hyung to Seoul Dynasty after a public dispute with the team. The team elected not to re-sign three of their players – Ted "silkthread" Wang, Luis "iRemiix" Galarza Figueroa, and Choi "Asher" Jun-sung.

=== Free agency ===
All non-expansion teams could not enter the free agency period until October 8, 2018; they were able to sign members from their respective academy team and make trades until then. On October 25, Gladiators signed DPS Jang "Decay" Gui-un and main tank Gye "rOar" Chang-hoon from Korean Overwatch Contenders team Kongdoo Panthera. On November 28, the team signed support Riku "Ripa" Toivanen from Team Gigantti in Contender's Europe. Gladiator's final offseason transaction was on December 10, when the team promoted Lee "Panker" Byong-ho from Gladiators Legion on a two-way contract.

== Regular season ==
=== Stage 1 ===
Los Angeles began their 2019 season with a match against Seoul Dynasty. Gladiators lost the match; notably, Gladiator's Lane "Surefour" Roberts played Symmetra, marking the first time in Overwatch League history that a team utilized Symmetra in their composition. LA found their first victory three days later against San Francisco Shock. The following, Gladiators fell to Paris Eternal by a score of 1–2. The team dropped both of their matches in week three, falling 1–2 to London Spitfire and 1–3 to Hangzhou Spark. Gladiators finished the stage on a high note by defeating Atlanta Reign and Guangzhou Charge in their final week of the stage to finish with a 3–4 record.

=== Stage 2 ===
Gladiators opened Stage 2 with a 3–1 victory over Shanghai Dragons. Los Angeles was able to string off five more consecutive wins, putting the team at a perfect 6–0 record heading into their final regular season match of the stage against Boston Uprising. The team failed to defeat Boston, giving them a 6–1 record for Stage 2 and the fourth seed in the Stage 2 Playoffs.

Gladiators faced New York Excelsior in the Stage 2 Quarterfinals on May 10. Unable to complete a single map, Gladiators were handily defeated by Excelsior, getting swept 0–3.

=== Stage 3 ===
Los Angeles began the stage with a match against the Dallas Fuel on June 7. The Gladiators dominated throughout the match, sweeping the Fuel, 4–0. Two days later, the team took on the undefeated Vancouver Titans. While they found some success in the match, an unwillingness to make compositional changes led to a 1–3 loss. Looking to bounce back from the loss, the team next faced the Philadelphia Fusion on June 14. Los Angeles took the first map, Oasis, without much resistance, and while the Fusion were able to push map two, Volskaya Industries, to two overtime rounds, the Gladiators would take that map as well. A win on Eichenwalde cemented the match victory. While the Gladiators lost the final map, Dorado, they won the match 3–1. Two days later, Los Angeles took on the Washington Justice; the Gladiators rolled the Justice, sweeping them 4–0. The team's next match was on June 21 against the Shanghai Dragons. Unable to contain the Dragons' dominant DPS play throughout the match, the Gladiators fell by a score of 1–3. The following week, Los Angeles faced the Toronto Defiant. A quick win on Nepal and another win on Horizon Lunar Colony put the Gladiators up 2–0 going into halftime. The final two maps both went to overtime rounds, but the Gladiators were able to find wins on both to complete a 4–0 sweep over the Defiant. The team's final match of the stage was against the Titans on June 30; the Gladiators were swept, 0–4. With a 4–3 record for Stage 3, Los Angeles finished with the ninth-best record for the stage, missing the stage playoffs by one spot.

=== Stage 4 ===
Prior to the start of Stage 4, which would include the implementation of an enforced 2-2-2 role lock by the League, the Gladiators transferred tank Kim "Bischu" Hyung-seok to the Guangzhou Charge for an undisclosed amount of cash.

The Gladiators opened their final stage with a match against the New York Excelsior on July 25. Los Angeles took the first two maps of the match; after dropping map three, the Gladiators won the final map to claim a 3–1 match victory. Two days later, the team took on the Houston Outlaws. Unable to overcome stellar performances by Houston's Dante "Danteh" Cruz and Alexandre "SPREE" Vanhomwegen, the Gladiators fell by a score of 1–3. The following week, Los Angeles faced the Chengdu Hunters. After splitting the first four maps, the match went to a fifth tiebreaker map; the Gladiators were able to pull out a win on the final map and won the match 3–2. The team took on the San Francisco Shock the following day. Los Angeles found themselves up 2–1 going into map four, but the Shock rallied back to tie up the series and bring the match to a fifth tiebreaker map; the Gladiators could not close out the series and lost 2–3. Looking to bounce back after the loss, the team next faced the Dallas Fuel on August 9. Los Angeles dropped the first two maps to go into halftime down 0–2; the team turned it around after the break, winning the next three consecutive maps take a 3–2 win. The following week, the Gladiators took on the Hangzhou Spark. For the fourth match in a row, the series was pushed to a fifth map; the Gladiators failed to win the final map and lost the match 2–3. For their final match of the regular season, the Gladiators headed to The Novo in Los Angeles to play in the Kit Kat Rivalry Weekend, hosted by the Los Angeles Valiant. Their only match of the weekend was against the Valiant on August 24 in the "Battle for LA." The Gladiators closed out the regular season on a high note, rallying to defeat the Valiant, 3–1.

== Playoffs ==
With a 17–11 regular season record, the Gladiators claimed the fifth seed in the season playoffs. The team opened the double-elimination tournament with a match against the fourth-seeded Hangzhou Spark on September 5. The Spark jumped out to a 1–0 lead after taking the first map win on Busan, but the Gladiators surged back, winning on King's Row, Temple of Anubis, and Rialto. Down 1–3, the Spark mounted their own comeback, winning the following two maps, Lijiang Tower and Eichenwalde. With the series tied 3–3, the match went to Watchpoint: Gibraltar for map seven. On offense, the Gladiators completed the map, and on defense, they held the Spark from reaching the second checkpoint, resulting in a 4–3 match victory. The win gave Los Angeles their first-ever playoff series win, including stage playoffs, in franchise history.

Advancing to the first round of the upper bracket, Los Angeles took on the Vancouver Titans on September 8. Through the first four maps, the two teams traded maps wins, as the series headed to Lijiang Tower tied 2–2. The Titans adapted to the Gladiators' aggressive playstyle and took the map win; Los Angeles was unable to prevent Vancouver from taking map six, Eichenwalde, and lost the series, 2–4. The loss sent the Gladiators to the second round of the lower bracket.

The Gladiators' next match was against the third-seeded San Francisco Shock on September 12. Los Angeles came out flat on the first map, Busan, and found themselves quickly down 0–1. From then on, the Gladiators put on a much better showing, showcasing great ultimate combinations between Chang-hoon "rOar" Gye on Orisa and Gui-un "Decay" Jang on Doomfist. While they were able to keep the battle competitive, the Shock proved to be too much to handle, as Los Angeles fell on King's Row and Horizon Lunar Colony. Down 0–3, the Gladiators sent the match to Rialto for map four. On their attack, the Gladiators completed the map, largely due to a stellar performance by João Pedro "Hydration" Goes Telles on Pharah. However, the Shock responded by completing the map with one of the fastest times in the history of the OWL on their attack; San Francisco won the map in overtime rounds. The 0–4 loss ended the Gladiators' playoff run.

== Final roster ==
Los Angeles Gladiators roster
Players
Coaches

Role	No.	Handle	Name	Nationality
Damage	4	Surefour	Roberts, Lane	Canada
Damage	16	Decay	Jang Gui-un	South Korea
Damage	99	Hydration	Goes Telles, João Pedro	United States
Tank	37	rOar	Gye Chang-hoon	South Korea
Tank	57	Void	Kang Jun-woo	South Korea
Tank	98	Panker (TW)	Lee Byong-ho	South Korea
Support	0	BigG00se	Isohanni, Benjamin	Finland
Support	10	Shaz	Suovaara, Jonas	Finland
Support	12	Ripa	Toivanen, Riku	Finland

Head coach

- David Pei

Legend:
- (I) Inactive
- (S) Suspended
- (2W) Two-way player
- Substitute
- (injured) Injury / Illness

Latest roster transaction: July 17, 2019.

=== Transactions ===
Transactions of/for players on the roster during the 2019 regular season:

- On July 17, Gladiators transferred Kim "Bischu" Hyung-seok to Guangzhou Charge.

== Standings ==
=== Record by stage ===
Stage	Pld	W	L	Pct	MW	ML	MT	MD	Pos
1	7	3	4	.429	14	13	2	+1	10
2	7	6	1	.857	19	9	1	+10	4
3	7	4	3	.571	17	11	0	+6	9
4 (Note: No stage playoffs were held for Stage 4.)	7	4	3	.571	17	15	0	+2	8
Overall	28	17	11	.607	67	48	3	+19	5
Qualified for playoffs • Qualified for play-in tournament

=== League ===
Pos	Div	Team	Pld	W	L	PCT	MW	ML	MT	MD	Qualification
1	PAC	Vancouver Titans	28	25	3	0.893	89	28	0	+61	Advance to season playoffs (division leaders)
2	ATL	New York Excelsior	28	22	6	0.786	78	38	3	+40	Advance to season playoffs (division leaders)
3	PAC	San Francisco Shock	28	23	5	0.821	92	26	0	+66	Advance to season playoffs
4	PAC	Hangzhou Spark	28	18	10	0.643	64	52	4	+12	Advance to season playoffs
5	PAC	Los Angeles Gladiators	28	17	11	0.607	67	48	3	+19	Advance to season playoffs
6	ATL	Atlanta Reign	28	16	12	0.571	69	50	1	+19	Advance to season playoffs
7	ATL	London Spitfire	28	16	12	0.571	58	52	6	+6	Advance to play-ins
8	PAC	Seoul Dynasty	28	15	13	0.536	64	50	3	+14	Advance to play-ins
9	PAC	Guangzhou Charge	28	15	13	0.536	61	57	1	+4	Advance to play-ins
10	ATL	Philadelphia Fusion	28	15	13	0.536	57	60	3	−3	Advance to play-ins
11	PAC	Shanghai Dragons	28	13	15	0.464	51	61	3	−10	Advance to play-ins
12	PAC	Chengdu Hunters	28	13	15	0.464	55	66	1	−11	Advance to play-ins
13	PAC	Los Angeles Valiant	28	12	16	0.429	56	61	4	−5	
14	ATL	Paris Eternal	28	11	17	0.393	46	67	3	−21	
15	PAC	Dallas Fuel	28	10	18	0.357	43	70	3	−27	
16	ATL	Houston Outlaws	28	9	19	0.321	47	69	3	−22	
17	ATL	Toronto Defiant	28	8	20	0.286	39	72	4	−33	
18	ATL	Washington Justice	28	8	20	0.286	39	72	6	−33	
19	ATL	Boston Uprising	28	8	20	0.286	41	78	2	−37	
20	ATL	Florida Mayhem	28	6	22	0.214	36	75	5	−39	

Source: The Overwatch League
Rules for classification: 1) winning percentage; 2) map differential; 3) head-to-head record; 4) head-to-head map differential

== Game log ==
=== Regular season ===
2019 game log (Regular season record: 17–11)
Stage 1 (3–4)

1	February 14	Seoul Dynasty	3	–	1	Los Angeles Gladiators	Burbank, CA
		Recap					Blizzard Arena
		0	Ilios			2	
		3	King's Row			1	
		1	Horizon Lunar Colony			0	
		5	Route 66			4	

2	February 17	San Francisco Shock	2	–	3	Los Angeles Gladiators	Burbank, CA
		Recap					Blizzard Arena
		2	Ilios			1	
		1	Hollywood			3	
		2	Horizon Lunar Colony			3	
		4	Rialto			3	
		1	Busan			2	

3	February 23	Los Angeles Gladiators	1	–	2	Paris Eternal	Burbank, CA
		Recap					Blizzard Arena
		2	Nepal			1	
		2	Numbani			3	
		3	Temple of Anubis			3	
		2	Dorado			3	

4	March 01	Los Angeles Gladiators	1	–	2	London Spitfire	Burbank, CA
		Recap					Blizzard Arena
		1	Busan			2	
		3	Numbani			3	
		3	Volskaya Industries			2	
		1	Dorado			2	

5	March 03	Hangzhou Spark	3	–	1	Los Angeles Gladiators	Burbank, CA
		Recap					Blizzard Arena
		2	Nepal			1	
		2	Hollywood			3	
		3	Volskaya Industries			2	
		1	Route 66			0	

6	March 07	Atlanta Reign	0	–	4	Los Angeles Gladiators	Burbank, CA
		Recap					Blizzard Arena
		0	Busan			2	
		3	King's Row			4	
		1	Temple of Anubis			2	
		0	Rialto			3	

7	March 09	Guangzhou Charge	1	–	3	Los Angeles Gladiators	Burbank, CA
		Recap					Blizzard Arena
		2	Nepal			0	
		3	King's Row			4	
		0	Temple of Anubis			2	
		1	Rialto			2	

Stage 2 (6–1)

8	April 04	Shanghai Dragons	1	–	3	Los Angeles Gladiators	Burbank, CA
	7:30 pm PST	Details					Blizzard Arena
		2	Busan			0	
		1	Temple of Anubis			2	
		3	King's Row			4	
		0	Watchpoint: Gibraltar			1	

9	April 05	Los Angeles Gladiators	3	–	2	Seoul Dynasty	Burbank, CA
	9:15 pm PST	Recap					Blizzard Arena
		0	Oasis			2	
		2	Paris			1	
		3	King's Row			2	
		3	Watchpoint: Gibraltar			4	
		2	Lijang Tower			0	

10	April 13	Los Angeles Gladiators	4	–	0	Guangzhou Charge	Burbank, CA
	4:30 pm PST	Recap					Blizzard Arena
		2	Lijiang Tower			1	
		3	Temple of Anubis			2	
		3	Blizzard World			2	
		3	Watchpoint: Gibraltar			1	

11	April 14	Los Angeles Valiant	1	–	2	Los Angeles Gladiators	Burbank, CA
	4:30 pm PST	Recap					Blizzard Arena
		0	Lijiang Tower			2	
		1	Hanamura			1	
		1	Eichenwalde			2	
		1	Rialto			0	

12	April 18	Florida Mayhem	1	–	3	Los Angeles Gladiators	Burbank, CA
	7:00 pm PST	Recap					Blizzard Arena
		2	Busan			0	
		1	Paris			2	
		2	Blizzard World			3	
		2	Junkertown			3	

13	April 20	Los Angeles Gladiators	3	–	1	Chengdu Hunters	Burbank, CA
	4:30 pm PST	Recap					Blizzard Arena
		2	Busan			0	
		1	Hanamura			2	
		2	Eichenwalde			1	
		1	Junkertown			0	

14	May 03	Boston Uprising	3	–	1	Los Angeles Gladiators	Burbank, CA
	5:30 pm PST	Recap					Blizzard Arena
		2	Oasis			1	
		2	Hanamura			1	
		2	Blizzard World			3	
		3	Rialto			2	

Stage 3 (4–3)

15	June 07	Los Angeles Gladiators	4	–	0	Dallas Fuel	Burbank, CA
	9:15 pm PST	Details					Blizzard Arena
		2	Oasis			0	
		2	Paris			0	
		3	Hollywood			2	
		3	Havana			1	

16	June 09	Vancouver Titans	3	–	1	Los Angeles Gladiators	Burbank, CA
	5:15 pm PST	Details					Blizzard Arena
		2	Ilios			0	
		2	Paris			3	
		2	Hollywood			1	
		3	Watchpoint: Gibraltar			0	

17	June 14	Los Angeles Gladiators	3	–	1	Philadelphia Fusion	Burbank, CA
	9:15 pm PST	Details					Blizzard Arena
		2	Oasis			0	
		6	Volskaya Industries			5	
		2	Eichenwalde			1	
		1	Dorado			2	

18	June 16	Washington Justice	0	–	4	Los Angeles Gladiators	Burbank, CA
	5:15 pm PST	Details					Blizzard Arena
		0	Nepal			2	
		0	Horizon Lunar Colony			2	
		0	Numbani			1	
		1	Havana			3	

19	June 21	Los Angeles Gladiators	1	–	3	Shanghai Dragons	Burbank, CA
	7:30 pm PST	Details					Blizzard Arena
		2	Oasis			0	
		3	Volskaya Industries			4	
		2	Eichenwalde			3	
		0	Dorado			1	

20	June 28	Toronto Defiant	0	–	4	Los Angeles Gladiators	Burbank, CA
	7:15 pm PST	Details					Blizzard Arena
		0	Nepal			2	
		1	Horizon Lunar Colony			2	
		3	Numbani			4	
		3	Dorado			4	

21	June 30	Los Angeles Gladiators	0	–	4	Vancouver Titans	Burbank, CA
	12:00 noon PST	Details					Blizzard Arena
		0	Ilios			2	
		3	Horizon Lunar Colony			4	
		1	Numbani			3	
		0	Watchpoint: Gibraltar			1	

Stage 4 (4–3)

22	July 25	Los Angeles Gladiators	3	–	1	New York Excelsior	Burbank, CA
	5:30 pm PST	Details					Blizzard Arena
		2	Busan			0	
		5	Temple of Anubis			4	
		0	Hollywood			1	
		3	Route 66			2	

23	July 27	Los Angeles Gladiators	1	–	3	Houston Outlaws	Burbank, CA
	3:30 pm PST	Details					Blizzard Arena
		1	Busan			2	
		2	Hanamura			3	
		2	Hollywood			1	
		2	Havana			3	

24	August 02	Chengdu Hunters	2	–	3	Los Angeles Gladiators	Burbank, CA
	7:30 pm PST	Details					Blizzard Arena
		2	Lijiang Tower			1	
		1	Volskaya Industries			2	
		1	King's Row			2	
		5	Junkertown			4	
		0	Busan			2	

25	August 03	Los Angeles Gladiators	2	–	3	San Francisco Shock	Burbank, CA
	5:15 pm PST	Details					Blizzard Arena
		2	Ilios			0	
		0	Hanamura			1	
		6	King's Row			5	
		2	Havana			3	
		0	Lijiang Tower			2	

26	August 09	Dallas Fuel	2	–	3	Los Angeles Gladiators	Burbank, CA
	5:45 pm PST	Details					Blizzard Arena
		2	Lijiang Tower			1	
		2	Temple of Anubis			1	
		2	King's Row			3	
		0	Junkertown			2	
		0	Busan			2	

27	August 16	Los Angeles Gladiators	2	–	3	Hangzhou Spark	Burbank, CA
	7:30 pm PST	Details					Blizzard Arena
		2	Busan			1	
		1	Temple of Anubis			2	
		4	Blizzard World			5	
		3	Route 66			2	
		0	Ilios			2	

28	August 24	Los Angeles Gladiators	3	–	1	Los Angeles Valiant	Los Angeles, CA
	7:15 pm PST	Details					The Novo
		0	Ilios			2	
		4	Volskaya Industries			3	
		2	Blizzard World			1	
		3	Havana			2	

=== Playoffs ===
2019 playoff game log
Stage 2 Playoffs (0–1)

Quarterfinals	May 10	New York Excelsior	3	–	0	Los Angeles Gladiators	Burbank, CA
	6:00 pm PST	Details					Blizzard Arena
		2	Lijang Tower			0	
		3	King's Row			2	
		2	Temple of Anubis			1	

Season Playoffs (1–2)

First round	September 5	Los Angeles Gladiators	4	–	3	Hangzhou Spark	Burbank, CA
	7:00 pm PST	Details					Blizzard Arena
		1	Busan			2	
		2	King's Row			0	
		4	Temple of Anubis			3	
		2	Rialto			1	
		1	Lijiang Tower			2	
		3	Eichenwalde			4	
		3	Watchpoint: Gibraltar			1	

Winners Round 1	September 8	Los Angeles Gladiators	2	–	4	Vancouver Titans	Burbank, CA
	12:00 noon PST	Details					Blizzard Arena
		0	Busan			2	
		3	King's Row			1	
		3	Temple of Anubis			4	
		4	Rialto			3	
		1	Lijiang Tower			2	
		1	Eichenwalde			2	

Losers Round 2	September 12	Los Angeles Gladiators	0	–	4	San Francisco Shock	Burbank, CA
	7:00 pm PST	Details					Blizzard Arena
		0	Busan			2	
		2	King's Row			3	
		2	Horizon Lunar Colony			3	
		3	Rialto			4	
