= 2019 Dallas Fuel season =

- Head coach: Aaron Atkins
- General manager: Mathew Taylor
- Owner: Mike Rufail; Kenneth Hersh
- Division: Pacific

Results
- Record: 10–18 (.357)
- Place: Pacific: 10th; League: 15th
- Stage 1 Playoffs: Did not qualify
- Stage 2 Playoffs: Quarterfinals
- Stage 3 Playoffs: Did not qualify
- Season Playoffs: Did not qualify
- Total Earnings: $25,000

The 2019 Dallas Fuel season was the second season of the Dallas Fuel's existence in the Overwatch League and was their first full season under head coach Aaron "Aero" Atkins. The team looked to improve on their disappointing 12–28 record from 2018, where they did not qualify for the season playoffs.

Dallas began the season posting an impressive 4–2 record through six games, but a 2–3 loss to the Boston Uprising eliminated the team from Stage 1 Playoff contention. The team hit their stride in Stage 2, amassing a 5–2 record, and qualified for the Stage 2 Playoffs. However, they were knocked out in the quarterfinals round by the Vancouver Titans in a 0–3 loss. The Fuel fell apart in the final half of the season, finding only one win in their final fourteen matches. With a 10–18 record for the season, the Fuel again did not qualify for the season playoffs.

== Preceding offseason ==
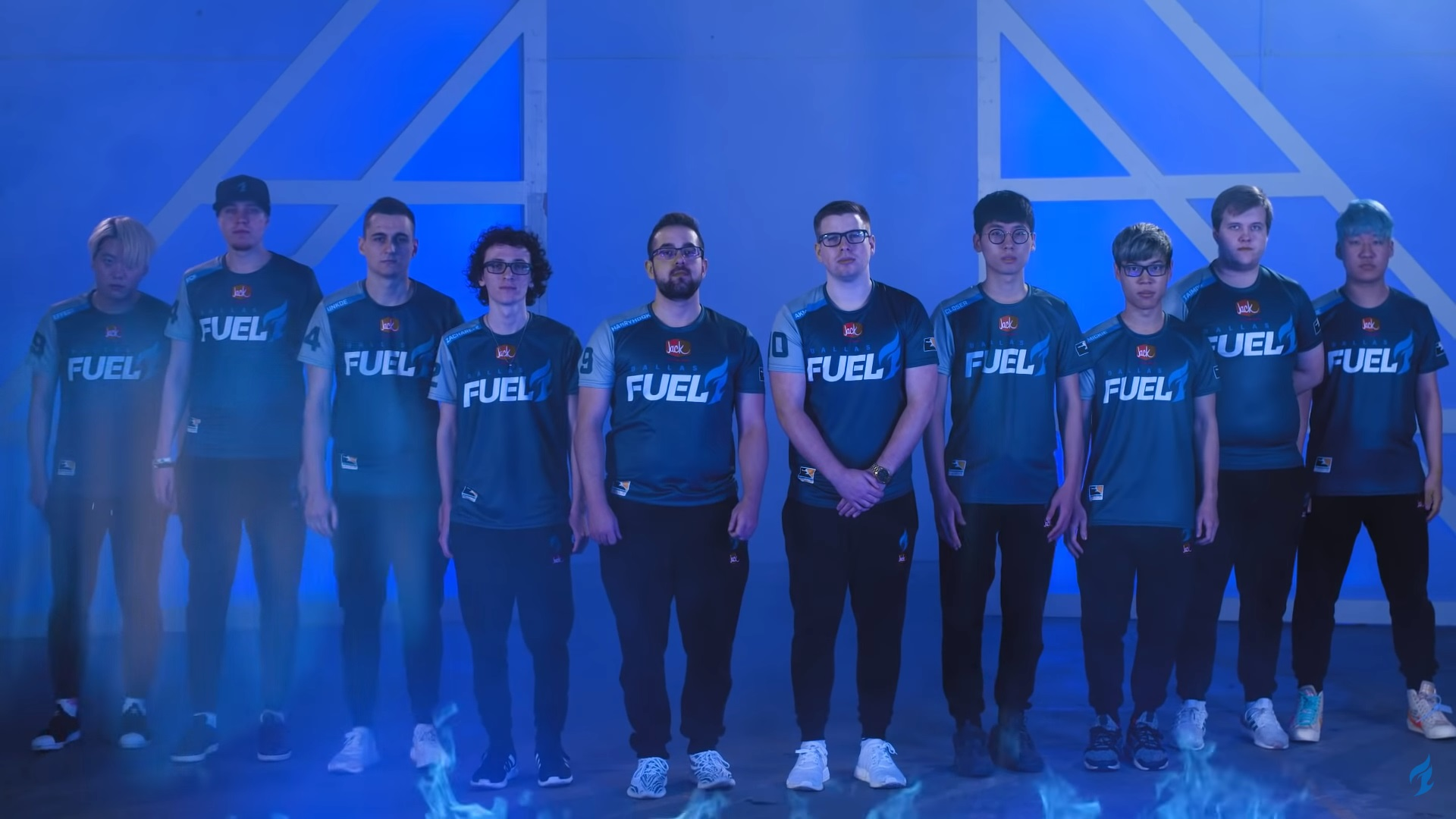
The Dallas Fuel roster at the beginning of the 2019 season. From left to right: EFFECT, rCk, uNKOE, ZachaREEE, HarryHook, aKm, Closer, Mickie, Taimou, OGE.

=== Player re-signings ===
From August 1 to September 9, 2018, all Overwatch League teams that competed in the 2018 season could choose to extend their team's players' contracts. Along with the retirement of star tank player Brandon "Seagull" Larned, Fuel released support Sebastian "Chipshajen" Widlund and tank Christian "cocco" Jonsson.

=== Free agency ===
All non-expansion teams could not enter the free agency period until October 8, 2018; they were able to sign members from their respective academy team and make trades until then. On October 15, Fuel acquired Jung "Closer" Won-sik from London Spitfire; Closer signed with Fuel on a two-way contract with Team Envy. On November 11, Fuel signed off-tank Richard "rCk" Kanerva from Overwatch Contenders team Team Gigantti to a two-year contract. Fuel's final offseason transaction was on December 3, when the team signed former Fusion University and United States Overwatch World Cup team player Zachary "ZachaREEE" Lombardo.

== Regular season ==
=== Stage 1 ===
Dallas began their 2019 season splitting their two matches in week one – a 0–4 loss against San Francisco Shock and a 3–1 win over Seoul Dynasty. The team repeated their inconsistent performance the following week, as Fuel fell 0–4 to Guangzhou Charge and defeated Philadelphia Fusion 3–1. After a pair of wins against Shanghai Dragons, Fuel took on Boston Uprising in their final match of the stage. Dallas took the first two maps of the match, but Boston was able to engineer a reverse sweep, placing Fuel at a 4–3 Stage 1 record and one match out from the Stage 1 Playoffs.

=== Stage 2 ===
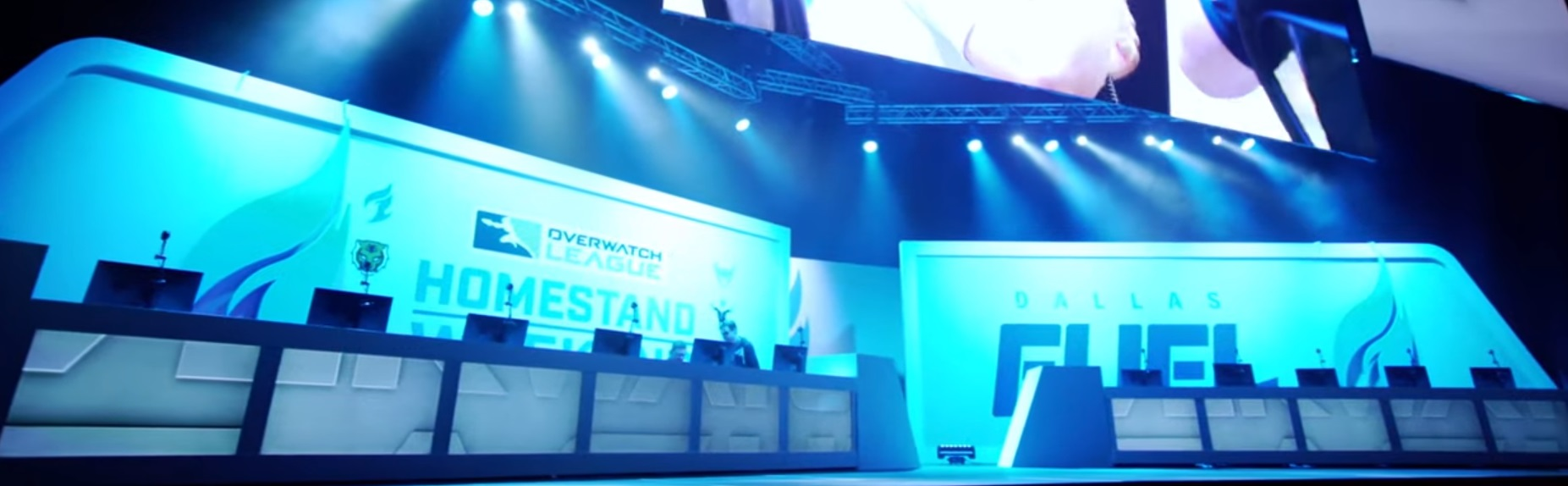
The Dallas Fuel Homestand took place at the Allen Event Center in Allen, Texas.

Dallas had a multitude of player and coaching changes at the start of Stage 2. On April 2, Dallas traded Richard "rCk" Kanerva to Boston Uprising in exchange for Lucas "NotE" Meissner. On the same day, assistant coach Christian "cocco" Jonsson retired from the Overwatch League; Dallas signed former Paris Eternal head coach Julien "daemoN" Ducros as an assistant coach a day later. Three days later, Fuel's Hyeon "EFFECT" Hwang retired from professional Overwatch due to mental health issues.

Fuel's first two matches of Stage 2 were not until week two, where Dallas swept Toronto Defiant 4–0 and edged over Paris Eternal 2–1. Week three was not as fortunate for Dallas, as the team was swept 0–4 by both Vancouver Titans and Seoul Dynasty. Fuel took both of their matches in their "Dallas Fuel Homestand Week", defeating Los Angeles Valiant and in-state rivals Houston Outlaws and clinching a Stage 2 Playoff berth. Dallas capped off the regular season of Stage 2 with a win over Florida Mayhem, ending the stage with a 5–2 record and the sixth seed in the Stage 2 Playoffs.

Two days before their quarterfinal match against the undefeated Vancouver Titans, Fuel promoted Ashley "Trill" Powell form their academy team Team Envy. Dallas was not able to put up much of a challenge for Titans, as Fuel was swept 0–3 in the match.

==== Homestand Weekend ====
Week four saw the "Dallas Fuel Homestand Weekend" – the first of three Overwatch League "Homestand Weekends" of the 2019 season. The two-day event, which took place at the Allen Event Center in Allen, Texas, sold out 4,500 seats each day. Held in part to test whether or not the league's plan to hold matches locally, Dallas Fuel was responsible for every aspect of the weekend aside from the broadcast, which was aired on ESPN2. During the first match of the weekend, a regional power outage delayed the event for 45 minutes. Marking the highest viewership of Stage 2, the homestand showed that the local-match model has promise.

=== Stage 3 ===
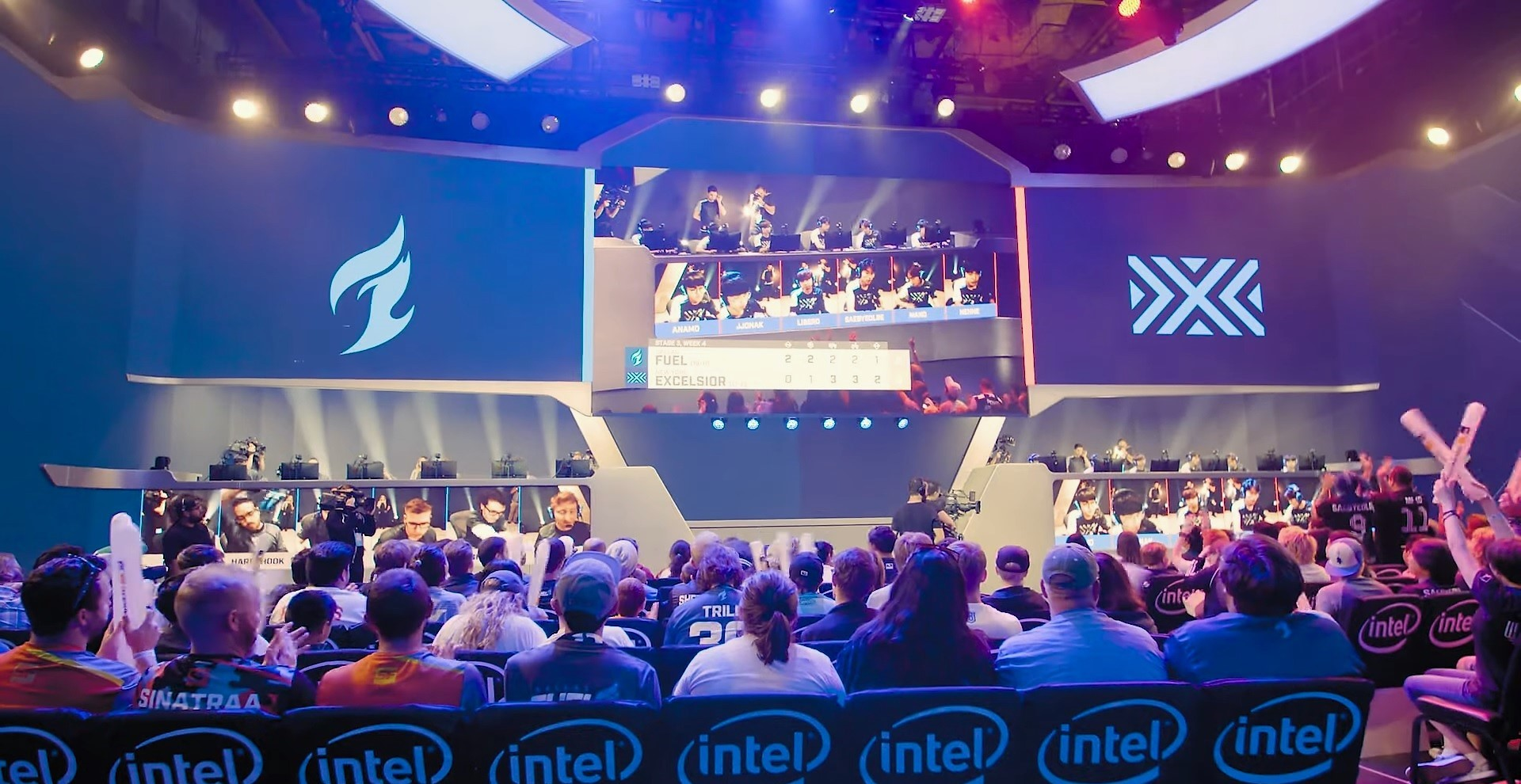
The Fuel were reversed swept by Excelsior in the final match of Stage 3.

Dallas opened Stage 3 on June 7 with a match against the Los Angeles Gladiators. The Fuel could not find a footing throughout the match, and was swept 0–4. Dallas turned it around two days later with a 3–0 victory over the Washington Justice. Notably, Dylan "aKm" Bignet tied an Overwatch League record set by Kelsey "Colourhex" Birse for highest average energy on Zarya in at map at 82%. The following week, the Fuel first took on the Chengdu Hunters on June 13. Dallas was unable to adapt to the off-meta compositions ran by the Hunters and lost the match 1–3. Two days later, the team faced the undefeated Vancouver Titans; the Fuel were dominated throughout the match and were swept 0–4.

The Fuel's struggles continued the following week, losing 0–3 to the Hangzhou Spark in a match where the Dallas roster looked to be falling apart. Three days later, the Fuel were swept 4–0 by the Hunters in a rematch of the previous week. Dallas' final match of the stage was against the New York Excelsior on June 29. After winning the first two maps, Dallas look primed to take a win from New York, but the Excelsior made the proper adjustments after halftime, and completing a reverse sweep by taking three consecutive maps to hand Dallas a 2–3 loss.

=== Stage 4 ===
The Fuel's first match of Stage 4, along with the first match with an enforced 2-2-2 role lock by the League, was against the London Spitfire on July 26. Dallas' tank line and DPS were outplayed that of London's, as the team fell in a 1–3 loss. The following week, the team lost to the Los Angeles Valiant by a 1–3 scoreline. Trying to find wins to realistically keep their playoff hopes alive, the Fuel took on the Los Angeles Gladiators on August 9. Dallas found themselves up 2–0 going into halftime, but the team crumbled thereafter, losing three consecutive maps to fall 2–3. Two days later, the team was swept 0–4 by the San Francisco Shock in a match that was as close as the scoreline. The following week, the Fuel fell to the Hangzhou Spark by a score of 1–3. The team's next match was against the Guangzhou Charge on August 18. Dallas found another loss in the matchup, as they were swept 0–4. Notably, an in-game bug cause an hour-long delay in the final map of the series – the longest delay in Overwatch League history. Officially eliminated from season playoff contention, the Fuel headed to The Novo in Los Angeles to play in the Kit Kat Rivalry Weekend, hosted by the Los Angeles Valiant. Their only match of the weekend was against the Atlanta Reign August 24. After the Reign took the first map with little resistance, both teams completed Volskaya Industries twice, to push the map to a second overtime round, but Dallas came out victorious, tying the series 1–1. Coming out of halftime, close losses on King's Row and Havana gave Dallas a 1–3 match loss. The loss ended Dallas' season with a 12-match losing streak.

== Final roster ==
2019 Dallas Fuel roster
Players
Coaches

Role	No.	Handle	Name	Nationality
Damage	10	aKm	Bignet, Dylan	France
Damage	13	Taimou	Kettunen, Timo	Finland
Damage	22	ZachaREEE	Lombardo, Zachary	United States
Tank	2	OGE	Son Min-seok	South Korea
Tank	3	NotE	Meissner, Lucas	Canada
Tank	7	Mickie	Rattanasangchod, Pongphop	Thailand
Tank	30	Trill	Powell, Ashley	Australia
Support	9	HarryHook (C)	Tejedor, Jonathan	Spain
Support	17	Closer	Jung Won-sik	South Korea
Support	24	Unkoe	Chevasson, Benjamin	France

Head coach

- Aaron Atkins

Legend:
- (I) Inactive
- (S) Suspended
- (2W) Two-way player
- Substitute
- (injured) Injury / Illness

Latest roster transaction: May 7, 2019.

=== Transactions ===
Transactions of/for players on the roster during the 2019 regular season:

- On April 2, Fuel traded Richard "rCk" Kanerva to Boston Uprising in exchange for Lucas "NotE" Meissner.
- On April 6, Hwang "EFFECT" Hyeon retired.
- On May 7, Fuel promoted Ashley "Trill" Powell from Team Envy.

== Standings ==
=== Record by stage ===
Stage	Pld	W	L	Pct	MW	ML	MT	MD	Pos
1	7	4	3	.571	15	15	0	±0	9
2	7	5	2	.714	16	11	1	+5	6
3	7	1	6	.143	6	21	2	-15	16
4 (Note: No stage playoffs were held for Stage 4.)	7	0	7	.000	6	23	0	-17	19
Overall	28	10	18	.357	43	70	3	-27	15
Qualified for playoffs • Qualified for play-in tournament

=== League ===
Pos	Div	Team	Pld	W	L	PCT	MW	ML	MT	MD	Qualification
1	PAC	Vancouver Titans	28	25	3	0.893	89	28	0	+61	Advance to season playoffs (division leaders)
2	ATL	New York Excelsior	28	22	6	0.786	78	38	3	+40	Advance to season playoffs (division leaders)
3	PAC	San Francisco Shock	28	23	5	0.821	92	26	0	+66	Advance to season playoffs
4	PAC	Hangzhou Spark	28	18	10	0.643	64	52	4	+12	Advance to season playoffs
5	PAC	Los Angeles Gladiators	28	17	11	0.607	67	48	3	+19	Advance to season playoffs
6	ATL	Atlanta Reign	28	16	12	0.571	69	50	1	+19	Advance to season playoffs
7	ATL	London Spitfire	28	16	12	0.571	58	52	6	+6	Advance to play-ins
8	PAC	Seoul Dynasty	28	15	13	0.536	64	50	3	+14	Advance to play-ins
9	PAC	Guangzhou Charge	28	15	13	0.536	61	57	1	+4	Advance to play-ins
10	ATL	Philadelphia Fusion	28	15	13	0.536	57	60	3	−3	Advance to play-ins
11	PAC	Shanghai Dragons	28	13	15	0.464	51	61	3	−10	Advance to play-ins
12	PAC	Chengdu Hunters	28	13	15	0.464	55	66	1	−11	Advance to play-ins
13	PAC	Los Angeles Valiant	28	12	16	0.429	56	61	4	−5	
14	ATL	Paris Eternal	28	11	17	0.393	46	67	3	−21	
15	PAC	Dallas Fuel	28	10	18	0.357	43	70	3	−27	
16	ATL	Houston Outlaws	28	9	19	0.321	47	69	3	−22	
17	ATL	Toronto Defiant	28	8	20	0.286	39	72	4	−33	
18	ATL	Washington Justice	28	8	20	0.286	39	72	6	−33	
19	ATL	Boston Uprising	28	8	20	0.286	41	78	2	−37	
20	ATL	Florida Mayhem	28	6	22	0.214	36	75	5	−39	

Source: The Overwatch League
Rules for classification: 1) winning percentage; 2) map differential; 3) head-to-head record; 4) head-to-head map differential

== Game log ==
=== Regular season ===
2019 game log (Regular season record: 10–18)
Stage 1 (4–3)

1	February 15	Dallas Fuel	0	–	4	San Francisco Shock	Burbank, CA
		Recap					Blizzard Arena
		0	Nepal			2	
		1	King's Row			3	
		2	Horizon Lunar Colony			3	
		1	Rialto			3	

2	February 17	Seoul Dynasty	1	–	3	Dallas Fuel	Burbank, CA
		Recap					Blizzard Arena
		1	Busan			2	
		3	King's Row			4	
		4	Volskaya Industries			3	
		0	Rialto			1	

3	February 21	Guangzhou Charge	4	–	0	Dallas Fuel	Burbank, CA
		Recap					Blizzard Arena
		2	Busan			0	
		2	Hollywood			1	
		2	Temple of Anubis			0	
		3	Route 66			2	

4	February 23	Philadelphia Fusion	1	–	3	Dallas Fuel	Burbank, CA
		Recap					Blizzard Arena
		0	Busan			2	
		1	Numbani			3	
		4	Horizon Lunar Colony			3	
		2	Dorado			3	

5	March 02	Shanghai Dragons	2	–	3	Dallas Fuel	Burbank, CA
		Recap					Blizzard Arena
		0	Ilios			2	
		3	Numbani			2	
		5	Volskaya Industries			4	
		4	Dorado			5	
		0	Nepal			2	

6	March 09	Dallas Fuel	4	–	0	Shanghai Dragons	Burbank, CA
		Recap					Blizzard Arena
		2	Nepal			1	
		3	Hollywood			2	
		3	Temple of Anubis			2	
		5	Route 66			4	

7	March 16	Boston Uprising	3	–	2	Dallas Fuel	Burbank, CA
		Recap					Blizzard Arena
		1	Ilios			2	
		2	King's Row			3	
		4	Volskaya Industries			3	
		3	Dorado			0	
		2	Nepal			1	

Stage 2 (5–2)

8	April 13	Dallas Fuel	4	–	0	Toronto Defiant	Burbank, CA
	3:00 pm PST	Recap					Blizzard Arena
		2	Oasis			0	
		5	Paris			4	
		3	King's Row			0	
		3	Rialto			2	

9	April 14	Dallas Fuel	2	–	1	Paris Eternal	Burbank, CA
	12:00 noon PST	Recap					Blizzard Arena
		2	Busan			0	
		2	Paris			2	
		4	Blizzard World			3	
		1	Rialto			2	

10	April 18	Vancouver Titans	4	–	0	Dallas Fuel	Burbank, CA
	8:30 pm PST	Recap					Blizzard Arena
		2	Lijiang Tower			0	
		2	Hanamura			1	
		4	Blizzard World			3	
		3	Junkertown			2	

11	April 20	Dallas Fuel	0	–	4	Seoul Dynasty	Burbank, CA
	3:00 pm PST	Recap					Blizzard Arena
		0	Lijiang Tower			2	
		2	Hanamura			3	
		1	Eichenwalde			2	
		4	Watchpoint: Gibraltar			5	

12	April 27	Los Angeles Valiant	0	–	4	Dallas Fuel	Allen, TX
	2:55 pm PST	Recap					Allen Event Center
		0	Oasis			2	
		1	Temple of Anubis			2	
		1	Eichenwalde			2	
		4	Junkertown			5	

13	April 28	Houston Outlaws	1	–	3	Dallas Fuel	Allen, TX
	4:15 pm PST	Recap					Allen Event Center
		0	Lijiang Tower			2	
		2	Temple of Anubis			1	
		2	King's Row			3	
		3	Watchpoint: Gibraltar			4	

14	May 02	Dallas Fuel	3	–	1	Florida Mayhem	Burbank, CA
	5:30 pm PST	Details					Blizzard Arena
		2	Busan			1	
		5	Temple of Anubis			6	
		3	King's Row			2	
		3	Rialto			0	

Stage 3 (1–6)

15	June 07	Los Angeles Gladiators	4	–	0	Dallas Fuel	Burbank, CA
	9:15 pm PST	Details					Blizzard Arena
		2	Oasis			0	
		2	Paris			0	
		3	Hollywood			2	
		3	Havana			1	

16	June 09	Washington Justice	0	–	3	Dallas Fuel	Burbank, CA
	3:30 pm PST	Details					Blizzard Arena
		0	Oasis			2	
		4	Volskaya Industries			4	
		2	Eichenwalde			3	
		0	Havana			3	

17	June 13	Dallas Fuel	1	–	3	Chengdu Hunters	Burbank, CA
	7:30 pm PST	Details					Blizzard Arena
		0	Ilios			2	
		3	Paris			2	
		1	Hollywood			3	
		2	Dorado			3	

18	June 15	Dallas Fuel	0	–	4	Vancouver Titans	Burbank, CA
	3:30 pm PST	Details					Blizzard Arena
		0	Ilios			2	
		2	Volskaya Industries			3	
		2	Eichenwalde			3	
		2	Dorado			3	

19	June 20	Hangzhou Spark	3	–	0	Dallas Fuel	Burbank, CA
	7:30 pm PST	Details					Blizzard Arena
		2	Nepal			0	
		4	Horizon Lunar Colony			4	
		3	Numbani			1	
		3	Havana			1	

20	June 23	Chengdu Hunters	4	–	0	Dallas Fuel	Burbank, CA
	12:00 noon PST	Details					Blizzard Arena
		2	Nepal			1	
		1	Horizon Lunar Colony			0	
		4	Numbani			3	
		3	Watchpoint: Gibraltar			0	

21	June 29	Dallas Fuel	2	–	3	New York Excelsior	Burbank, CA
	12:00 noon PST	Details					Blizzard Arena
		2	Oasis			0	
		2	Paris			1	
		2	Hollywood			3	
		2	Watchpoint: Gibraltar			3	
		1	Nepal			2	

Stage 4 (0–7)

22	July 26	Dallas Fuel	1	–	3	London Spitfire	Burbank, CA
	5:45 pm PST	Details					Blizzard Arena
		2	Ilios			1	
		1	Hanamura			2	
		2	King's Row			3	
		1	Route 66			2	

23	August 03	Dallas Fuel	1	–	3	Los Angeles Valiant	Burbank, CA
	3:30 pm PST	Details					Blizzard Arena
		2	Busan			1	
		4	Volskaya Industries			5	
		2	Hollywood			3	
		3	Route 66			4	

24	August 09	Dallas Fuel	2	–	3	Los Angeles Gladiators	Burbank, CA
	5:45 pm PST	Details					Blizzard Arena
		2	Lijiang Tower			1	
		2	Temple of Anubis			1	
		2	King's Row			3	
		0	Junkertown			2	
		0	Busan			2	

25	August 11	San Francisco Shock	4	–	0	Dallas Fuel	Burbank, CA
	3:30 pm PST	Details					Blizzard Arena
		2	Ilios			0	
		2	Temple of Anubis			0	
		3	Blizzard World			2	
		3	Junkertown			1	

26	August 15	Dallas Fuel	1	–	3	Hangzhou Spark	Burbank, CA
	5:45 pm PST	Details					Blizzard Arena
		2	Lijiang Tower			0	
		2	Hanamura			3	
		0	Blizzard World			2	
		3	Junkertown			4	

27	August 18	Dallas Fuel	0	–	4	Guangzhou Charge	Burbank, CA
	5:15 pm PST	Details					Blizzard Arena
		1	Ilios			2	
		0	Hanamura			2	
		1	Hollywood			3	
		3	Havana			4	

28	August 24	Atlanta Reign	3	–	1	Dallas Fuel	Los Angeles, CA
	2:00 pm PST	Details					The Novo
		2	Busan			0	
		4	Volskaya Industries			5	
		3	King's Row			2	
		2	Havana			1	

=== Playoffs ===
2019 playoff game log
Stage 2 Playoffs (0–1)

Quarterfinals	May 10	Dallas Fuel	0	–	3	Vancouver Titans	Burbank, CA
	8:00 pm PST	Details					Blizzard Arena
		0	Oasis			2	
		2	King's Row			3	
		0	Temple of Anubis			1	
