= 2019 Chengdu Hunters season =

Chinese esports team season

- Head coach: Wang Xingrui (王星睿)
- Owner: Huya
- Division: Pacific

Results
- Record: 13–15 (.464)
- Place: Pacific: 8th; League: 12th
- Stage 1 Playoffs: Did not qualify
- Stage 2 Playoffs: Did not qualify
- Stage 3 Playoffs: Did not qualify
- Season Playoffs: Did not qualify

The 2019 Chengdu Hunters season was the first season of Chengdu Hunters's existence in the Overwatch League as one of eight expansion franchises added for the 2019 season. After posting three consecutive 3–4 records for the first three stages, the Hunters failed to qualify for any of the Stage Playoffs. A 4–3 record in Stage 4 gave Chengdu 13–15 record for the season and qualified them for the Play-In Tournament, where they were eliminated in the first round by the Guangzhou Charge by a 1–4 scoreline.

== Preceding offseason ==
Chengdu announced the entirety of their initial starting roster in late November, consisting of the following players:

- Kong "Kyo" Chun-ting,
- Li "Yveltal" Xian-yao,
- Guan "GARRY" Li,
- Luo "Elsa" Wen-jie,
- Ding "ameng" Meng-han,
- Ma "lateyoung" Tian-bin,
- Yi "JinMu" Hu,
- Lo "Baconjack" Tzu-Heng, and
- Zhang "YangXiaoLong" Zhi-hao.

The team also had signed Ted "silkthread" Wang, but silkthread retired from professional Overwatch on November 30. On January 16, Chengdu signed Wei "jiqiren" Yan-song.

== Regular season ==
=== Stage 1 ===
Chengdu opened their 2019 season on February 15 with a victory over fellow Chinese expansion franchise Guangzhou Charge. After their second week of play, which resulted in a loss to Seoul Dynasty and a win over Florida Mayhem, it became apparent that Chengdu was generally not playing to the triple tank, triple support meta that the majority of the league was; instead, the team primarily featured a DPS-heavy composition. Chengdu would go on to lose three matches straight before defeating Atlanta Reign in their final match of Stage 1 to finish the stage with a 3–4 record.

=== Stage 2 ===
Hunters began Stage 2 with a match against Paris Eternal on April 6. Sticking with their off-meta team composition strategy, Chengdu swept Paris 4–0. Chengdu defeated Washington Justice 3–1 a day later in a match that featured an Overwatch League record 27 out of the 30 possible heroes in the game. Despite the strong start, Chengdu went on a three-game losing streak before finding their next win against London Spitfire on April 28. Chengdu's final match of the stage was against Los Angeles Valiant. Hunters lost the match 2–3 to put them out of playoff contention and for the second stage in a row, finish the stage with a 3–4 record.

=== Stage 3 ===
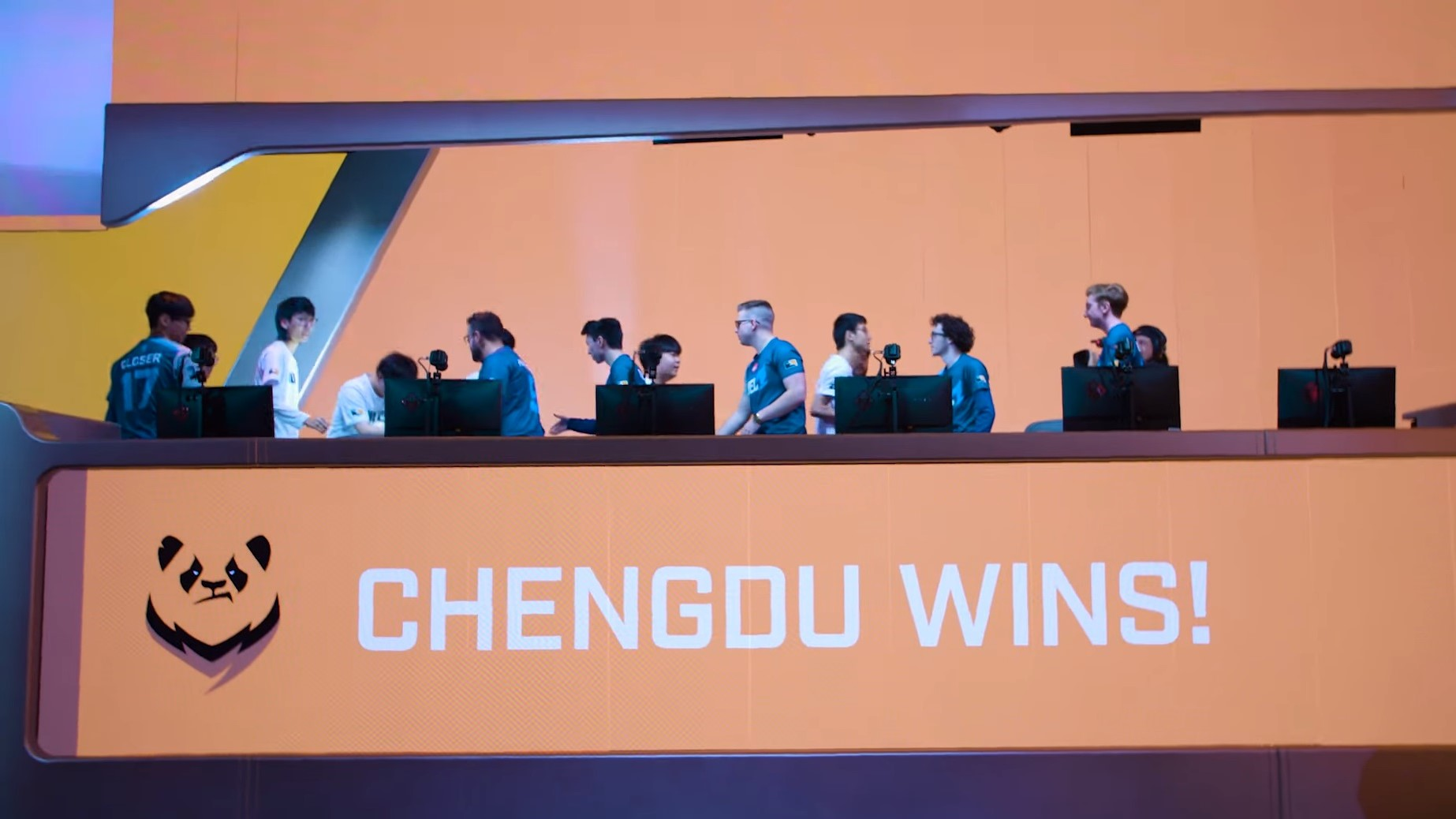
Chengdu Hunters post-match handshake after defeating Dallas Fuel in Stage 3.

The Hunters opened Stage 3 on June 6 with a 1–3 loss to the Guangzhou Charge. Two days later, the team was swept 0–4 by the Los Angeles Valiant. Chengdu took on the Dallas Fuel a week later, looking to rebound from the previous two losses. The team kept Dallas guessing throughout the match and took a decisive 3–1 victory. The team's next match was on June 21, when they faced the undefeated Vancouver Titans. While Chengdu was able to take the first map of the match, they dropped the following three, leading to a 1–3 loss. The Hunters rebounded two days later, when they swept the Dallas Fuel 4–0 in a rematch of the previous week. For the final week of the stage, Chengdu first took on the Stage 2 Champions San Francisco Shock on June 27. The match went to a fifth tiebreaker map, and the Hunters managed to pull out a 3–2 victory. Chengdu was unable to close out the stage with a winning record, however, as they fell 0–3 to the Seoul Dynasty three days later and ended the stage with another 3–4 record.

=== Stage 4 ===
A day prior to their first match of Stage 4, which would include the implementation of an enforced 2-2-2 role lock by the League, the Hunters brought in DPS prospect Xin "leave" Huang. The 17-year-old would not be eligible to officially sign with the Hunters until 2020 season.

The team's first match of the stage was against the Philadelphia Fusion on July 26. The match went the distance, needing a fifth map to determine the winner; Chengdu was able to take map five to win 3–2. Two days later, the team faced the Boston Uprising. The match also went the distance, and with game MVP performance from support Xianyao "Yveltal" Li on Mercy, Chengdu took another 3–2 win. The following week, the Hunters faced the Los Angeles Gladiators. For the third match in a row, the game went to a fifth tiebreaker map; this time, Chengdu was unable to pull out the win and lost the match 2–3. The team came back in full force two days later with a match against the Atlantic Champions New York Excelsior. DPS Yi "Jinmu" Hu on Pharah gave New York troubles throughout the series; that, along with Chengdu's ability to dive NYXL's Jeong "Nenne" Yeon-kwan on Widowmaker, proved to be too much for the Excelsior to handle, as handed New York their first 4–0 sweep in franchise history. The following week, Chengdu faced the Hangzhou Spark; the team fell 1–3 in the match. The Hunter's final week of play saw them first face the San Francisco Shock on August 16. Chengdu was dominated throughout the match and was swept 0–4. Needing a win to keep their slim playoff hopes alive, the Hunters faced the Houston Outlaws in their final match of the season. Chengdu pulled out a 3–2 victory after the match went to a fifth tiebreaker map. The team finished the season with a 13–15 record and qualified for the Play-In Tournament.

== Postseason ==
As the twelfth seed in the overall standings, the Hunters qualified for the Play-In Tournament, where they took on the ninth-seeded Guangzhou Charge on August 30. After dropping the first two maps, Ilios and Eichenwalde, the Hunters closed the gap by taking map three, Horizon Lunar Colony. However, the Charge would not yield another map, as the Hunters lost the match 1–4 and ended their 2019 season.

== Final roster ==
2019 Chengdu Hunters roster
Players
Coaches

Role	No.	Handle	Name	Nationality
Damage	24	JinMu	Yi Hu	China
Damage	74	Baconjack	Lo Tzu-Heng	Taiwan
Damage	88	YangXiaoLong	Zhang Zhihao	China
Damage		leave (I)	Huang Xin	China
Tank	3	Elsa	Luo Wenjie	China
Tank	5	Ameng	Ding Menghan	China
Tank	64	LateYoung	Ma Tianban	China
Tank	99	jiqiren	Wei Yansong	China
Support	7	Kyo (C)	Kong Chunting	China
Support	29	Yveltal	Li Xianyao	China
Support	77	GARRY	Li Guan	China

Head coach

- Wang Xingrui

Legend:
- (I) Inactive
- (S) Suspended
- (2W) Two-way player
- Substitute
- (injured) Injury / Illness

Latest roster transaction: January 16, 2019.

=== Transactions ===
Transactions of/for players on the roster during the 2019 regular season:

- On July 25, Hunters signed Xin "Leave" Huang.

== Standings ==
=== Record by stage ===
Stage	Pld	W	L	Pct	MW	ML	MT	MD	Pos
1	7	3	4	.429	12	20	0	-8	16
2	7	3	4	.429	15	14	0	+1	9
3	7	3	4	.429	12	16	1	-4	13
4 (Note: No stage playoffs were held for Stage 4.)	7	4	3	.571	16	16	0	±0	9
Overall	28	13	15	.464	55	66	1	-11	12
Qualified for playoffs • Qualified for play-in tournament

=== League ===
Pos	Div	Team	Pld	W	L	PCT	MW	ML	MT	MD	Qualification
1	PAC	Vancouver Titans	28	25	3	0.893	89	28	0	+61	Advance to season playoffs (division leaders)
2	ATL	New York Excelsior	28	22	6	0.786	78	38	3	+40	Advance to season playoffs (division leaders)
3	PAC	San Francisco Shock	28	23	5	0.821	92	26	0	+66	Advance to season playoffs
4	PAC	Hangzhou Spark	28	18	10	0.643	64	52	4	+12	Advance to season playoffs
5	PAC	Los Angeles Gladiators	28	17	11	0.607	67	48	3	+19	Advance to season playoffs
6	ATL	Atlanta Reign	28	16	12	0.571	69	50	1	+19	Advance to season playoffs
7	ATL	London Spitfire	28	16	12	0.571	58	52	6	+6	Advance to play-ins
8	PAC	Seoul Dynasty	28	15	13	0.536	64	50	3	+14	Advance to play-ins
9	PAC	Guangzhou Charge	28	15	13	0.536	61	57	1	+4	Advance to play-ins
10	ATL	Philadelphia Fusion	28	15	13	0.536	57	60	3	−3	Advance to play-ins
11	PAC	Shanghai Dragons	28	13	15	0.464	51	61	3	−10	Advance to play-ins
12	PAC	Chengdu Hunters	28	13	15	0.464	55	66	1	−11	Advance to play-ins
13	PAC	Los Angeles Valiant	28	12	16	0.429	56	61	4	−5	
14	ATL	Paris Eternal	28	11	17	0.393	46	67	3	−21	
15	PAC	Dallas Fuel	28	10	18	0.357	43	70	3	−27	
16	ATL	Houston Outlaws	28	9	19	0.321	47	69	3	−22	
17	ATL	Toronto Defiant	28	8	20	0.286	39	72	4	−33	
18	ATL	Washington Justice	28	8	20	0.286	39	72	6	−33	
19	ATL	Boston Uprising	28	8	20	0.286	41	78	2	−37	
20	ATL	Florida Mayhem	28	6	22	0.214	36	75	5	−39	

Source: The Overwatch League
Rules for classification: 1) winning percentage; 2) map differential; 3) head-to-head record; 4) head-to-head map differential

== Game log ==
=== Regular season ===
2019 game log (Regular season record: 13–15)
Stage 1 (3–4)

1	February 15	Chengdu Hunters	3	–	2	Guangzhou Charge	Burbank, CA
		Recap					Blizzard Arena
		0	Busan			2	
		3	Numbani			2	
		2	Volskaya Industries			3	
		2	Dorado			1	
		2	Nepal			1	

2	February 21	Seoul Dynasty	4	–	0	Chengdu Hunters	Burbank, CA
		Recap					Blizzard Arena
		2	Ilios			1	
		2	Hollywood			1	
		4	Horizon Lunar Colony			3	
		3	Rialto			2	

3	February 23	Chengdu Hunters	3	–	2	Florida Mayhem	Burbank, CA
		Recap					Blizzard Arena
		2	Nepal			1	
		2	King's Row			3	
		2	Temple of Anubis			0	
		2	Rialto			3	
		2	Busan			0	

4	March 01	Shanghai Dragons	4	–	0	Chengdu Hunters	Burbank, CA
		Recap					Blizzard Arena
		2	Busan			1	
		3	Numbani			2	
		5	Volskaya Industries			4	
		2	Dorado			1	

5	March 07	Toronto Defiant	3	–	1	Chengdu Hunters	Burbank, CA
		Recap					Blizzard Arena
		2	Ilios			1	
		1	King's Row			0	
		2	Volskaya Industries			3	
		3	Route 66			2	

6	March 10	Vancouver Titans	3	–	2	Chengdu Hunters	Burbank, CA
		Recap					Blizzard Arena
		2	Ilios			0	
		1	Hollywood			2	
		1	Temple of Anubis			2	
		3	Route 66			2	
		2	Nepal			0	

7	March 16	Atlanta Reign	2	–	3	Chengdu Hunters	Burbank, CA
		Recap					Blizzard Arena
		0	Nepal			2	
		4	Numbani			3	
		0	Horizon Lunar Colony			1	
		3	Rialto			2	
		0	Busan			2	

Stage 2 (3–4)

8	April 06	Chengdu Hunters	4	–	0	Paris Eternal	Burbank, CA
	5:15 pm PST	Details					Blizzard Arena
		2	Oasis			1	
		4	Hanamura			3	
		4	Blizzard World			3	
		2	Rialto			1	

9	April 07	Washington Justice	1	–	3	Chengdu Hunters	Burbank, CA
	5:15 pm PST	Recap					Blizzard Arena
		0	Oasis			2	
		1	Temple of Anubis			0	
		0	King's Row			1	
		3	Watchpoint: Gibraltar			4	

10	April 12	Chengdu Hunters	1	–	3	Shanghai Dragons	Burbank, CA
	8:30 pm PST	Recap					Blizzard Arena
		0	Lijiang Tower			2	
		1	Paris			0	
		2	King's Row			3	
		2	Junkertown			3	

11	April 20	Los Angeles Gladiators	3	–	1	Chengdu Hunters	Burbank, CA
	4:30 pm PST	Recap					Blizzard Arena
		2	Busan			0	
		1	Hanamura			2	
		2	Eichenwalde			1	
		1	Junkertown			0	

12	April 27	Hangzhou Spark	3	–	1	Chengdu Hunters	Allen, TX
	11:25 am PST	Recap					Allen Event Center
		2	Busan			1	
		3	Temple of Anubis			2	
		1	Blizzard World			2	
		5	Junkertown			4	

13	April 28	Chengdu Hunters	3	–	1	London Spitfire	Allen, TX
	11:45 am PST	Recap					Allen Event Center
		2	Oasis			1	
		4	Paris			5	
		3	Eichenwalde			0	
		2	Rialto			1	

14	May 04	Chengdu Hunters	2	–	3	Los Angeles Valiant	Burbank, CA
	4:30 pm PST	Recap					Blizzard Arena
		0	Lijiang Tower			2	
		2	Paris			1	
		2	King's Row			3	
		2	Watchpoint: Gibraltar			0	
		0	Busan			2	

Stage 3 (3–4)

15	June 06	Guangzhou Charge	3	–	1	Chengdu Hunters	Burbank, CA
	7:30 pm PST	Details					Blizzard Arena
		2	Oasis			0	
		5	Volskaya Industries			4	
		6	Eichenwalde			5	
		2	Dorado			3	

16	June 08	Los Angeles Valiant	4	–	0	Chengdu Hunters	Burbank, CA
	5:15 pm PST	Details					Blizzard Arena
		2	Oasis			0	
		5	Horizon Lunar Colony			4	
		5	Numbani			3	
		3	Havana			2	

17	June 13	Dallas Fuel	1	–	3	Chengdu Hunters	Burbank, CA
	7:30 pm PST	Details					Blizzard Arena
		0	Ilios			2	
		3	Paris			2	
		1	Hollywood			3	
		2	Dorado			3	

18	June 21	Chengdu Hunters	1	–	3	Vancouver Titans	Burbank, CA
	9:15 pm PST	Details					Blizzard Arena
		2	Nepal			1	
		2	Volskaya Industries			3	
		3	Hollywood			4	
		0	Havana			2	

19	June 23	Chengdu Hunters	4	–	0	Dallas Fuel	Burbank, CA
	12:00 noon PST	Details					Blizzard Arena
		2	Nepal			1	
		1	Horizon Lunar Colony			0	
		4	Numbani			3	
		3	Watchpoint: Gibraltar			0	

20	June 27	San Francisco Shock	2	–	3	Chengdu Hunters	Burbank, CA
	9:00 pm PST	Details					Blizzard Arena
		1	Ilios			2	
		4	Volskaya Industries			3	
		4	Eichenwalde			5	
		2	Dorado			0	
		1	Oasis			2	

21	June 30	Chengdu Hunters	0	–	3	Seoul Dynasty	Burbank, CA
	5:15 pm PST	Details					Blizzard Arena
		1	Ilios			2	
		5	Paris			5	
		1	Eichenwalde			2	
		1	Watchpoint: Gibraltar			3	

Stage 4 (4–3)

22	July 26	Philadelphia Fusion	2	–	3	Chengdu Hunters	Burbank, CA
	9:15 pm PST	Details					Blizzard Arena
		0	Busan			2	
		3	Hanamura			2	
		2	Blizzard World			3	
		2	Junkertown			1	
		1	Ilios			2	

23	July 28	Boston Uprising	2	–	3	Chengdu Hunters	Burbank, CA
	5:15 pm PST	Details					Blizzard Arena
		1	Busan			2	
		3	Volskaya Industries			2	
		0	Blizzard World			3	
		2	Havana			0	
		0	Ilios			2	

24	August 02	Chengdu Hunters	2	–	3	Los Angeles Gladiators	Burbank, CA
	7:30 pm PST	Details					Blizzard Arena
		2	Lijiang Tower			1	
		1	Volskaya Industries			2	
		1	King's Row			2	
		5	Junkertown			4	
		0	Busan			2	

25	August 04	Chengdu Hunters	4	–	0	New York Excelsior	Burbank, CA
	5:15 pm PST	Details					Blizzard Arena
		2	Lijiang Tower			0	
		2	Temple of Anubis			1	
		4	King's Row			3	
		2	Route 66			1	

26	August 10	Chengdu Hunters	1	–	3	Hangzhou Spark	Burbank, CA
	5:15 pm PST	Details					Blizzard Arena
		2	Ilios			1	
		0	Hanamura			1	
		2	King's Row			3	
		3	Havana			4	

27	August 16	Chengdu Hunters	0	–	4	San Francisco Shock	Burbank, CA
	5:45 pm PST	Details					Blizzard Arena
		0	Ilios			2	
		1	Hanamura			2	
		0	Hollywood			1	
		1	Route 66			2	

28	August 17	Chengdu Hunters	3	–	2	Houston Outlaws	Burbank, CA
	5:15 pm PST	Details					Blizzard Arena
		1	Ilios			2	
		2	Temple of Anubis			1	
		2	Hollywood			1	
		2	Junkertown			3	
		2	Lijiang Tower			1	

=== Playoffs ===
2019 playoff game log
Play-In Tournament (0–1)

Quarterfinals	August 30	Chengdu Hunters	1	–	4	Guangzhou Charge	Burbank, CA
	6:00 pm PST	Details					Blizzard Arena
		1	Ilios			2	
		1	Eichenwalde			2	
		3	Horizon Lunar Colony			2	
		2	Rialto			3	
		0	Lijiang Tower			2	
