= 2019 Los Angeles Valiant season =

- Head coach: Moon Byung-chul (rel. Mar 11); Mike Szklanny (interim)
- Owner: Noah Whinston
- Division: Pacific

Results
- Record: 12–16 (.429)
- Place: Pacific: 9th; League: 13th
- Stage 1 Playoffs: Did not qualify
- Stage 2 Playoffs: Did not qualify
- Stage 3 Playoffs: Semifinals
- Season Playoffs: Did not qualify
- Total Earnings: $50,000

The 2019 Los Angeles Valiant season was the second season of Los Angeles Valiant's existence in the Overwatch League. The Valiant entered the season under head coach Moon Byung-chul as the defending Pacific Division champions and looked to improve from their 2018 season, when the team qualified for the playoffs but fell in the semifinals to the London Spitfire.

Los Angeles struggled in the first stage of the season, not winning a single match in Stage 1. With the poor start, the Valiant fired head coach Moon and Mike "Packing10" Szklanny took over as the interim head coach for the remainder of the season. The team's first victory came on April 12 in a 3–2 win over the Atlanta Reign. The Valiant finished Stage 2 with an improved, but disappointing, 3–4 record. After the All-Star break, the Valiant hit their stride. Highlighted by a 3–1 win over the undefeated Vancouver Titans, the Valiant amassed a 5–2 record in Stage 3 to claim the sixth seed in the Stage 3 Playoffs. After taking down the Hangzhou Spark 3–2 in the quarterfinals, the Valiant fell to the San Francisco Shock, 0–4 in the semifinals. Despite the team's resurgence, a 0–4 to the Shock in the final match of the regular season prevented the Valiant from qualifying for the season playoffs.

== Preceding offseason ==
=== Player re-signings ===
From August 1 to September 9, 2018, all Overwatch League teams that competed in the 2018 season could choose to extend their team's players' contracts. Valiant released three of their twelve players – tank Finnbjörn "Finnsi" Jónasson, tank Seb "Numlocked" Barton, and support Stefano "Verbo" Disalvo.

=== Free agency ===
All non-expansion teams could not enter the free agency period until October 8, 2018; they were able to sign members from their respective academy team and make trades until then. On September 13, Valiant acquired main tank Kim "KuKi" Dae-kuk from Seoul Dynasty. On October 18, Valiant transferred DPS Terence "SoOn" Tarlier to an unnamed team, later revealed to be 2019 expansion team Paris Eternal. On the same day, Los Angeles traded assistant coaches Julien "Daemon" Ducros and Jordan "Gunba" Graham to Paris Eternal and Boston Uprising, respectively.

== Regular season ==
=== Stage 1 ===
Valiant opened their 2019 season with a 2–3 loss against Hangzhou Spark. Valiant would not find a single win in Stage 1 – a dramatic difference from the teams 2018 season, where Valiant finished with the best record in the Pacific Division. Two days after their final match of Stage 1, Valiant fired head coach Byungchul "Moon" Moon and announced that Mike "Packing10" Szklanny would the acting interim head coach on March 11.

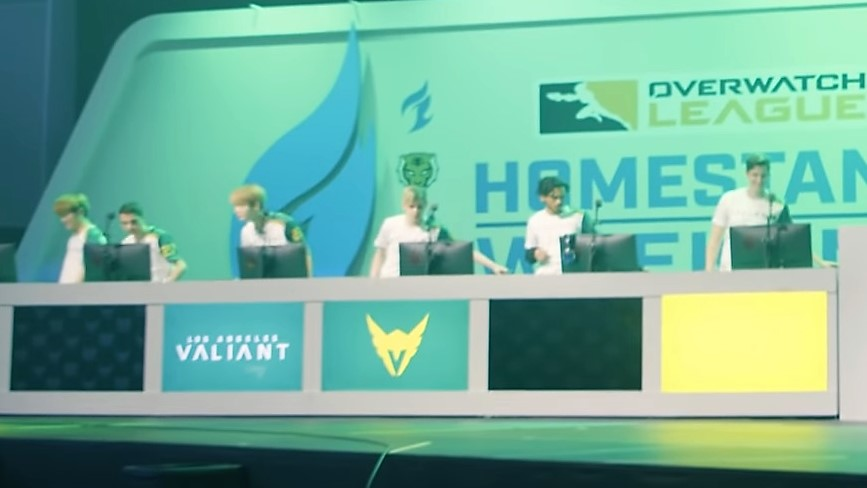
Valiant taking the stage at the Dallas Fuel Homestand. From left to right: Fate, KSF, Izayaki, Agilities, SPACE, Custa.

=== Stage 2 ===
Los Angeles began Stage 2 on April 5 with a 0–4 sweep by San Francisco Shock to pick up their eighth consecutive loss of the season. Five days later, Valiant hired Marvin "Promise" Schröder, who previously was an assistant coach for Florida Mayhem, as an assistant coach. The team broke their losing streak on April 12 with a 3–2 victory over Atlanta Reign, marking their first win of the 2019 season. Valiant picked up a pair of wins throughout the remainder of the stage to finish with a Stage 2 record of 3–4.

=== Stage 3 ===
Prior to the start of Stage 3, the Valiant traded main tank Koo "Fate" Pan-seung to Florida Mayhem in exchange for off-tank Caleb "McGravy" McGarvey and Mayhem Academy players Russell "FCTFCTN" Campbell and Johannes "Shax" Nielsen.

Los Angeles opened Stage 3 on June 6 with a 1–3 loss to the Shanghai Dragons. The next day, the team parted ways with DPS Chae "Bunny" Jun-hyeok. The team rebounded from their previous loss the next day, as they swept the Chengdu Hunters, 4–0. The following week, the Valiant took on the Guangzhou Charge Los Angeles took advantage of the Charge's inability to change strategies throughout the match and came out with a 3–1 victory. The team's next match was against the Dragons, who had defeated them just weeks prior, on June 20. The team built on their recent momentum and took a 3–1 win. Three days later, the Valiant took on the undefeated Vancouver Titans. Despite losing the first map, the Valiant stormed back to take the next three maps and won the match 3–1, snapping the Titans 19-game winning streak and handing them their first loss of the regular season. For their final week of the stage, the Valiant first took on the Hangzhou Spark on June 27. The match went down to the wire, as the teams went to a fifth tiebreaker map, but Los Angeles could not pull out the win and lost 2–3. The team's final match of the stage was against the London Spitfire the following day. The Valiant utilized an effective Sombra composition throughout the match and swept the Spitfire, 4–0.

Finishing Stage 3 with an impressive 5–2 record, the Valiant claimed the sixth seed in the Stage 3 Playoffs. For their quarterfinals match, the team took on the third-seeded Hangzhou Spark on 12 July. The match opened on Ilios, while Hangzhou kept it close in both rounds, the Valiant came out with a map win. The Spark quickly turned it around, however, claiming wins on Hollywood and Paris, largely due to a strong performance from main tank Xu "guxue" Qiulin on Winston on both maps. However, the Valiant evened the match score with a win on Havana, bringing the match to a fifth tiebreaker map. The match went to Oasis; the Valiant handed the Spark their first ever map five loss and won the series 3–2. Advancing to the semifinals, the Valiant faced the Stage 2 Champions San Francisco Shock the following day. After losing on the first map, Oasis, the Valiant selected Eichenwalde for map two. The Shock were able to complete the map on their attack, but the Valiant were unable to do the same. Coming out of the match break down 0–2, the Valiant could not turn things around, as they fell on the following two maps to get swept, 0–4.

=== Stage 4 ===
Prior to the beginning of Stage 4, which would include the implementation of an enforced 2-2-2 role lock by the league, main tank Kim "KuKi" Dae-kuk retired. Additionally, the Valiant transferred support Kim "Izayaki" Min-chul, who mostly acted as a substitute for Park "KariV" Young-seo throughout the season, to the Shanghai Dragons.

The Valiant's first match of Stage 4 was against the Paris Eternal on July 27. After winning the first two maps, the Valiant fell on maps three and four, pushing the match to a fifth tiebreaker map. The two-hour match concluded with Los Angeles winning on the final map, Busan, to win the series, 3–2. The team's next match was against the Seoul Dynasty on August 1. Like their previous match, the series went to a fifth tiebreaker map; however, the Valiant did not come out the a win on the final map and lost by a score of 2–3. The team rebounded two days later, as they defeated the Dallas Fuel by a 3–1 scoreline. The following week, Los Angeles first took on the Florida Mayhem. Despite Florida's DPS Ha "Sayaplayer" Jeong-woo breaking the record for most final blows in a map at 42, the Valiant were able to come out with a 2–1 win. The team's next match was on August 17, against the Boston Uprising. After winning the first two maps, the Valiant dropped map three. Map four, Havana, went to overtime rounds after both teams completed the map on their first attack, but the Valiant was able to come out with the map win and won the series, 3–1.

For the final week of the season, the Valiant hosted the "Kit Kat Rivalry Weekend" at The Novo in Los Angeles. The Valiant needed a win in at least one of their final two matches in order to qualify for the season playoffs. For their first match of the weekend, Los Angeles faced the Los Angeles Gladiators in the "Battle for LA." The Valiant could not come out with the win, as they fell 1–3 to their in-town rivals. For their last match of the season, the team took on the San Francisco Shock for the "California Cup" on August 25. However, the Valiant could not take down the Shock, as they were swept 0–4 to end their season.

== Final roster ==
2019 Los Angeles Valiant roster
Players
Coaches

Role	No.	Handle	Name	Nationality
Damage	9	Agilities	Giradi, Brady	Canada
Damage	12	Shax	Nielsen, Johannes	Denmark
Damage	27	KSF	Frandanisa, Kyle	United States
Tank	2	FCTFCTN	Campbell, Russell	United States
Tank	16	SPACE	Halpern, Indy	United States
Tank	13	McGravy	McGarvey, Caleb	United States
Support	10	Custa (C)	Kennedy, Scott	Australia
Support	99	KariV	Park Young-seo	South Korea

Head coach

- Mike Szklanny

Legend:
- (I) Inactive
- (S) Suspended
- (2W) Two-way player
- Substitute
- (injured) Injury / Illness

Latest roster transaction: July 19, 2019.

=== Transactions ===
Transactions of/for players on the roster during the 2019 regular season:

- On May 10, Valiant traded Koo "Fate" Pan-seung to Florida Mayhem in exchange for Caleb "Mcgravy" McGarvy, Russell "FCTFCTN" Campbell, (Note: Traded from Mayhem Academy.) and Johannes "Shax" Nielsen.
- On June 7, Valiant released Chae "Bunny" Joon-hyuk.
- On July 6, Kim "KuKi" Dae-kuk retired.
- On July 20, Valiant transferred Kim "Izayaki" Min-chul to Shanghai Dragons.

== Standings ==
=== Record by stage ===
Stage	Pld	W	L	Pct	MW	ML	MT	MD	Pos
1	7	0	7	.000	10	19	2	-9	20
2	7	3	4	.429	12	18	1	-6	13
3	7	5	2	.714	20	9	0	+11	6
4 (Note: No stage playoffs were held for Stage 4.)	7	4	3	.571	14	15	1	-1	11
Overall	28	12	16	.429	56	61	4	-5	13
Qualified for playoffs • Qualified for play-in tournament

=== League ===
Pos	Div	Team	Pld	W	L	PCT	MW	ML	MT	MD	Qualification
1	PAC	Vancouver Titans	28	25	3	0.893	89	28	0	+61	Advance to season playoffs (division leaders)
2	ATL	New York Excelsior	28	22	6	0.786	78	38	3	+40	Advance to season playoffs (division leaders)
3	PAC	San Francisco Shock	28	23	5	0.821	92	26	0	+66	Advance to season playoffs
4	PAC	Hangzhou Spark	28	18	10	0.643	64	52	4	+12	Advance to season playoffs
5	PAC	Los Angeles Gladiators	28	17	11	0.607	67	48	3	+19	Advance to season playoffs
6	ATL	Atlanta Reign	28	16	12	0.571	69	50	1	+19	Advance to season playoffs
7	ATL	London Spitfire	28	16	12	0.571	58	52	6	+6	Advance to play-ins
8	PAC	Seoul Dynasty	28	15	13	0.536	64	50	3	+14	Advance to play-ins
9	PAC	Guangzhou Charge	28	15	13	0.536	61	57	1	+4	Advance to play-ins
10	ATL	Philadelphia Fusion	28	15	13	0.536	57	60	3	−3	Advance to play-ins
11	PAC	Shanghai Dragons	28	13	15	0.464	51	61	3	−10	Advance to play-ins
12	PAC	Chengdu Hunters	28	13	15	0.464	55	66	1	−11	Advance to play-ins
13	PAC	Los Angeles Valiant	28	12	16	0.429	56	61	4	−5	
14	ATL	Paris Eternal	28	11	17	0.393	46	67	3	−21	
15	PAC	Dallas Fuel	28	10	18	0.357	43	70	3	−27	
16	ATL	Houston Outlaws	28	9	19	0.321	47	69	3	−22	
17	ATL	Toronto Defiant	28	8	20	0.286	39	72	4	−33	
18	ATL	Washington Justice	28	8	20	0.286	39	72	6	−33	
19	ATL	Boston Uprising	28	8	20	0.286	41	78	2	−37	
20	ATL	Florida Mayhem	28	6	22	0.214	36	75	5	−39	

Source: The Overwatch League
Rules for classification: 1) winning percentage; 2) map differential; 3) head-to-head record; 4) head-to-head map differential

== Game log ==
=== Regular season ===
2019 game log (Regular season record: 12–16)
Stage 1 (0–7)

1	February 16	Los Angeles Valiant	2	–	3	Hangzhou Spark	Burbank, CA
		Recap					Blizzard Arena
		1	Busan			2	
		3	Numbani			1	
		4	Temple of Anubis			3	
		2	Dorado			3	
		1	Nepal			2	

2	February 22	New York Excelsior	3	–	2	Los Angeles Valiant	Burbank, CA
		Recap					Blizzard Arena
		0	Nepal			2	
		2	Hollywood			1	
		0	Volskaya Industries			2	
		2	Rialto			1	
		2	Ilios			0	

3	February 24	Toronto Defiant	2	–	1	Los Angeles Valiant	Burbank, CA
		Recap					Blizzard Arena
		2	Ilios			1	
		3	Hollywood			3	
		4	Horizon Lunar Colony			3	
		2	Dorado			3	

4	March 01	Vancouver Titans	3	–	1	Los Angeles Valiant	Burbank, CA
		Recap					Blizzard Arena
		2	Nepal			0	
		3	King's Row			2	
		1	Horizon Lunar Colony			0	
		2	Rialto			3	

5	March 03	Los Angeles Valiant	1	–	3	Guangzhou Charge	Burbank, CA
		Recap					Blizzard Arena
		0	Ilios			2	
		4	King's Row			5	
		1	Horizon Lunar Colony			2	
		3	Rialto			2	

6	March 07	Los Angeles Valiant	2	–	3	Philadelphia Fusion	Burbank, CA
		Recap					Blizzard Arena
		0	Nepal			2	
		2	Numbani			3	
		2	Temple of Anubis			1	
		3	Route 66			0	
		1	Busan			2	

7	March 09	Los Angeles Valiant	1	–	2	Houston Outlaws	Burbank, CA
		Recap					Blizzard Arena
		1	Busan			2	
		3	Numbani			2	
		3	Volskaya Industries			3	
		0	Route 66			2	

Stage 2 (3–4)

8	April 05	Los Angeles Valiant	0	–	4	San Francisco Shock	Burbank, CA
	7:30 pm PST	Recap					Blizzard Arena
		0	Busan			2	
		2	Temple of Anubis			3	
		1	Blizzard World			2	
		0	Watchpoint: Gibraltar			1	

9	April 12	Los Angeles Valiant	3	–	2	Atlanta Reign	Burbank, CA
	4:00 pm PST	Recap					Blizzard Arena
		2	Lijiang Tower			0	
		2	Paris			3	
		0	Blizzard World			1	
		3	Junkertown			2	
		2	Busan			1	

10	April 14	Los Angeles Valiant	1	–	2	Los Angeles Gladiators	Burbank, CA
	4:30 pm PST	Recap					Blizzard Arena
		0	Lijiang Tower			2	
		1	Hanamura			1	
		1	Eichenwalde			2	
		1	Rialto			0	

11	April 19	Los Angeles Valiant	3	–	1	Washington Justice	Burbank, CA
	7:00 pm PST	Recap					Blizzard Arena
		2	Oasis			0	
		3	Temple of Anubis			4	
		3	King's Row			2	
		3	Rialto			0	

12	April 27	Los Angeles Valiant	0	–	4	Dallas Fuel	Allen, TX
	2:55 pm PST	Recap					Allen Event Center
		0	Oasis			2	
		1	Temple of Anubis			2	
		1	Eichenwalde			2	
		4	Junkertown			5	

13	April 28	Seoul Dynasty	3	–	2	Los Angeles Valiant	Allen, TX
	1:30 pm PST	Recap					Allen Event Center
		2	Busan			0	
		2	Hanamura			3	
		6	King's Row			3	
		2	Junkertown			3	
		2	Oasis			1	

14	May 04	Chengdu Hunters	2	–	3	Los Angeles Valiant	Burbank, CA
	4:30 pm PST	Recap					Blizzard Arena
		0	Lijiang Tower			2	
		2	Paris			1	
		2	King's Row			3	
		2	Watchpoint: Gibraltar			0	
		0	Busan			2	

Stage 3 (5–2)

15	June 06	Los Angeles Valiant	1	–	3	Shanghai Dragons	Burbank, CA
	9:15 pm PST	Details					Blizzard Arena
		0	Oasis			2	
		3	Paris			4	
		0	Numbani			3	
		1	Watchpoint: Gibraltar			0	

16	June 08	Los Angeles Valiant	4	–	0	Chengdu Hunters	Burbank, CA
	5:15 pm PST	Details					Blizzard Arena
		2	Oasis			0	
		5	Horizon Lunar Colony			4	
		5	Numbani			3	
		3	Havana			2	

17	June 15	Guangzhou Charge	1	–	3	Los Angeles Valiant	Burbank, CA
	5:15 pm PST	Details					Blizzard Arena
		0	Ilios			2	
		4	Horizon Lunar Colony			3	
		3	Numbani			4	
		1	Havana			2	

18	June 20	Shanghai Dragons	1	–	3	Los Angeles Valiant	Burbank, CA
	9:15 pm PST	Details					Blizzard Arena
		1	Nepal			2	
		2	Horizon Lunar Colony			1	
		2	Eichenwalde			3	
		4	Dorado			5	

19	June 23	Los Angeles Valiant	3	–	1	Vancouver Titans	Burbank, CA
	5:15 pm PST	Details					Blizzard Arena
		0	Oasis			2	
		2	Paris			1	
		3	Eichenwalde			2	
		3	Dorado			1	

20	June 27	Hangzhou Spark	3	–	2	Los Angeles Valiant	Burbank, CA
	5:30 pm PST	Details					Blizzard Arena
		2	Ilios			1	
		0	Volskaya Industries			1	
		2	Hollywood			1	
		2	Dorado			3	
		2	Oasis			0	

21	June 28	London Spitfire	0	–	4	Los Angeles Valiant	Burbank, CA
	5:30 pm PST	Details					Blizzard Arena
		1	Nepal			2	
		3	Volskaya Industries			4	
		0	Hollywood			3	
		0	Watchpoint: Gibraltar			3	

Stage 4 (4–3)

22	July 27	Paris Eternal	2	–	3	Los Angeles Valiant	Burbank, CA
	12:00 noon PST	Details					Blizzard Arena
		0	Lijiang Tower			2	
		1	Temple of Anubis			2	
		4	Blizzard World			3	
		5	Route 66			3	
		1	Busan			2	

23	August 01	Los Angeles Valiant	2	–	3	Seoul Dynasty	Burbank, CA
	9:15 pm PST	Details					Blizzard Arena
		0	Busan			2	
		2	Hanamura			1	
		3	King's Row			0	
		3	Route 66			4	
		1	Ilios			2	

24	August 03	Dallas Fuel	1	–	3	Los Angeles Valiant	Burbank, CA
	3:30 pm PST	Details					Blizzard Arena
		2	Busan			1	
		4	Volskaya Industries			5	
		2	Hollywood			3	
		3	Route 66			4	

25	August 10	Florida Mayhem	1	–	2	Los Angeles Valiant	Burbank, CA
	3:30 pm PST	Details					Blizzard Arena
		0	Ilios			2	
		1	Temple of Anubis			1	
		1	Hollywood			0	
		4	Junkertown			5	

26	August 17	Los Angeles Valiant	3	–	1	Boston Uprising	Burbank, CA
	1:45 pm PST	Details					Blizzard Arena
		2	Busan			0	
		2	Hanamura			1	
		2	King's Row			3	
		5	Havana			4	

27	August 24	Los Angeles Gladiators	3	–	1	Los Angeles Valiant	Los Angeles, CA
	7:15 pm PST	Details					The Novo
		0	Ilios			2	
		4	Volskaya Industries			3	
		2	Blizzard World			1	
		3	Havana			2	

28	August 25	San Francisco Shock	4	–	0	Los Angeles Valiant	Los Angeles, CA
	5:15 pm PST	Details					The Novo
		2	Lijiang Tower			0	
		2	Volskaya Industries			1	
		3	Blizzard World			2	
		2	Junkertown			1	

=== Playoffs ===
2019 playoff game log
Stage 3 Playoffs (1–1)

Quarterfinals	July 12	Los Angeles Valiant	3	–	2	Hangzhou Spark	Burbank, CA
	8:00 pm PST	Details					Blizzard Arena
		2	Ilios			0	
		1	Hollywood			3	
		1	Paris			2	
		3	Havana			2	
		2	Oasis			0	

Semifinals	July 13	Los Angeles Valiant	0	–	4	San Francisco Shock	Burbank, CA
	11:00 pm PST	Details					Blizzard Arena
		0	Oasis			2	
		2	Eichenwalde			3	
		1	Volskaya Industries			2	
		0	Havana			3	
