= List of Hangzhou Spark players =

Hangzhou Spark is a Chinese esports team founded in 2018 that competes in the Overwatch League (OWL). The Spark began playing competitive Overwatch in the 2019 season.

All rostered players during the OWL season (including the playoffs) are included, even if they did not make an appearance.

== All-time roster ==
As of December 15, 2021

Handle	Name	Role	Country	Seasons	Ref.
Ado	Chon Gi-hyeon	Damage	South Korea	2020	
Adora	Jaehwan Kang	Damage	South Korea	2019–2020	
AlphaYi	Jun Kim	Damage	South Korea	2022–present	
Architect	Minho Park	Damage	South Korea	2020–present	
Bazzi	Junki Park	Damage	South Korea	2019–2020	
BeBe	Huichang Yoon	Support	South Korea	2019–2020	
Bernar	Shin Se-won	Tank	South Korea	2021–present	
ColdEst	Tong Xiaodong	Support	China	2020–2021	
GodsB	Kyeongbo Kim	Damage	South Korea	2019–2021	
guxue	Qiulin Xu	Tank	China	2019–present	
iDK	Hojin Park	Support	South Korea	2019–2021	
irony	Hyeongwoo Kim	Support	South Korea	2022–present	
Krystal	Shilong Cai	Damage	China	2019	
LiGe	Chengjie Jia	Tank	China	2021–present	
M1ka	Jiming Liu	Support	China	2020–2021	
MCD	Jeongho Lee	Support	South Korea	2021	
NoSmite	Daun Jeong	Tank	South Korea	2019	
Pineapple	Li Zhuo	Damage	China	2022–present	
QoQ	Seungjun Yu	Tank	South Korea	2020	
Revenge	Hyeonggeun An	Support	South Korea	2019	
Ria	Sungwook Park	Tank	South Korea	2019–2020	
SASIN	Sanghyun Song	Flex	South Korea	2019–2020	
SeoMinSoo	Minsoo Seo	Damage	South Korea	2021	
Shy	Yangjie Zheng	Damage	China	2021–present	
Superich	Wu Gengtuo	Support	China	2022–present	
Takoyaki	Younghyun Lee	Tank	South Korea	2021	
