= 2019 Shanghai Dragons season =

- Head coach: We Seong-hwan
- General manager: Yang Van
- Owner: NetEase
- Division: Pacific

Results
- Record: 13–15 (.464)
- Place: Pacific: 7th; League: 11th
- Stage 1 Playoffs: Did not qualify
- Stage 2 Playoffs: Quarterfinals
- Stage 3 Playoffs: Champions
- Season Playoffs: Did not qualify
- Total Earnings: $225,000

The 2019 Shanghai Dragons season was the second season of the Shanghai Dragons's existence in the Overwatch League and the team's first season under head coach We "BlueHaS" Seong-hwan. The Dragons looked to improve from their atrocious 0–40 season the prior year.

Shanghai opened the season with two consecutive losses, but on February 23, Shanghai snapped their 42-game losing streak – the longest losing streak in professional sports history – by defeating the Boston Uprising 3–1, marking the franchise's first ever win. The team picked up two more wins in Stage 1 for a respectable 3–4 record for the stage. The Dragons found more success in Stage 2, as they finished with a 4–3 record and qualified for their first ever stage playoffs; however, the fell 1–3 to the San Francisco Shock in the quarterfinals. After the All-Star break, the Dragons hit their stride, amassing a 5–2 Stage 3 record, and qualified for the Stage 3 Playoffs. The team put on an unprecedented playoff run, taking down the top-seeded New York Excelsior 3–1 and the second-seeded Vancouver Titans 4–1 in the quarterfinals and semifinals, respectively. The team then took down the third-seeded San Francisco Shock 4–3 in the finals to claim their first-ever stage championship. Shanghai's success did not last, however; after the implementation of a 2-2-2 role lock by the league in Stage 4, the Dragons only won one match in their final seven to finish the season with a 13–15 record.

In eleventh place in the regular season standings, Shanghai had to compete in the Play-In Tournament in order to qualify for the season playoffs. A 4–2 win over the Philadelphia Fusion sent the Dragons to the second round, where they faced the London Spitfire. The match against London went to an OWL record eight maps, but the Dragons fell 3–4 to end their playoff hopes.

== Preceding offseason ==
=== Player re-signings ===
From August 1 to September 9, 2018, all Overwatch League teams that competed in the 2018 season could choose to extend their team's players' contracts. In hopes of not reliving the 2018 season, Shanghai Dragons re-signed only three of their eleven members of their roster, releasing Liu "Xushu" Jun-jie, Jing "Roshan" Wen-hao, Cheng "Altering" Yage, Chen "Fiveking" Zhaoyu, Xu "Freefeel" Peixuan, He "Sky" Jun-jian, Chon "Ado" Gi-hyeon, and Kim "Daemin" Dae-min.

=== Free agency ===
All non-expansion teams could not enter the free agency period until October 8, 2018; they were able to sign members from their respective academy team and make trades until then. On September 21, Shanghai Dragons hired We "BlueHaS" Seong-hwan as the team's new head coach. The team announced the addition of six players on October 22. Four of the six players, Jin "YOUNGJIN" Young-jin, Yang "DDing" Jin-hyeok, Yang "Luffy" Sung-hyeon, and Son "CoMa" Kyung-woo, were signed from Overwatch Contenders Korea team Kongdoo Panthera, while Min "diem" Sung-bae was signed from Contenders China team Lucky Future Zenith and former Toronto Esports player Jo "GuardiaN" Jun-hwan was not signed to a team at the time. The team's final offseason transaction occurred on February 12, two days before the beginning of the regular season, when Dragons acquired main tank Noh "Gamsu" Young-jin from Boston Uprising.

== Regular season ==
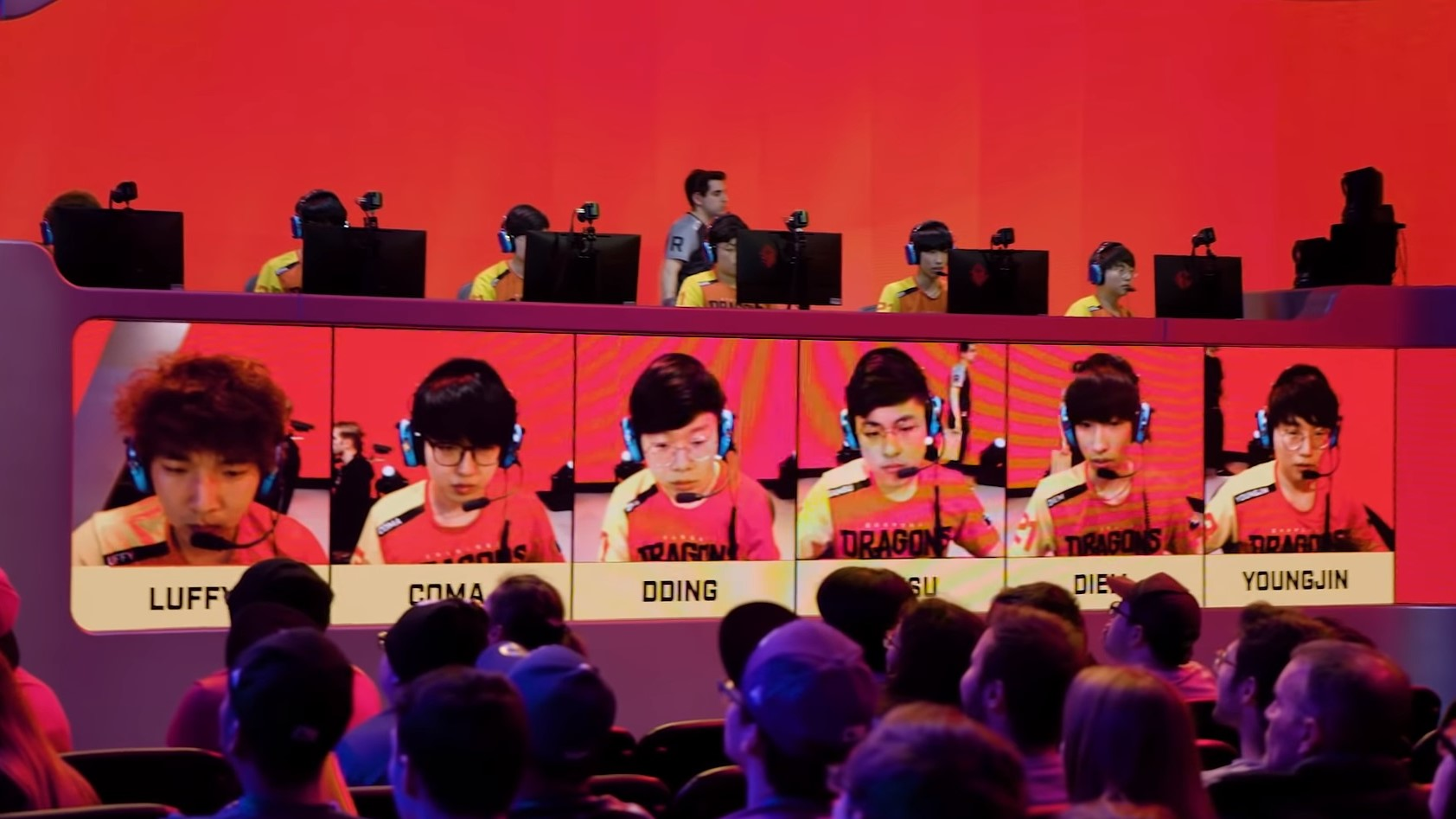
Dragons at the Blizzard Arena in Stage 1.

=== Stage 1 ===
Shanghai began their 2019 season with two losses in week one – a 1–3 loss to Hangzhou Spark and a 0–4 loss to Vancouver Titans – bringing their losing streak to 42 games, spanning back from their 2018 season. Dragons faced Boston Uprising in their lone match of week two on February 23. Dragons were led by main tank Gamsu, who Shanghai acquired from Uprising just a few week prior, en route to defeating Boston, snapping the franchises professional sports record 42-game losing streak and first ever win in the Overwatch League. Shanghai carried that momentum into their third week of play, sweeping Chengdu Hunters, and marking the franchise their first ever winning streak. Shanghai fell in back-to-back matches against Dallas Fuel before defeating the defending 2018 OWL champions London Spitfire to finish the stage with a 3–4 record.

=== Stage 2 ===
Dragons began Stage 2 with losses to Los Angeles Gladiators and the undefeated New York Excelsior. A day prior to their next match, Shanghai Dragons transferred Lee "Fearless" Eui-seok to its academy team, Team CC. Shanghai was able win their next four matches over Chengdu Hunters, Florida Mayhem, Houston Outlaws, and Washington Justice before falling to San Francisco Shock in their final match of the Stage 2 regular season to end the stage with a 4–3 record and a Stage 2 Playoff berth.

Shanghai faced San Francisco, who they had lost to the prior week in the final match of Stage 2, in the Stage 2 Quarterfinals on May 9. While Shanghai was able to win the first map of the match, ending San Francisco's map win streak, the team lost the next three maps, losing to Shock 1–3.

=== Stage 3 ===
Shanghai opened Stage 3 on June 6 with a 3–1 win over the Los Angeles Valiant. The following week, the Dragons faced Atlanta Reign. The Dragons dropped to a quick 0–1 deficit, but they came back to claim three of the last four maps to win the match, 3–2. Prior to their next match, the Dragons acquired off-tank Lee "envy" Kang-jae from Toronto Defiant. The team's next match was against the Valiant, who they had defeated just weeks prior, on June 20. The Dragons could not fin a win this time, falling 1–3. The following day, Shanghai took on the Los Angeles Gladiators. The Dragons' DPS put on a dominant performance throughout the match, leading to a decisive 3–1 victory. The team's next match was against the Guangzhou Charge a week later; the Dragons took the match 3–1. For the last week of the stage, the Dragons headed to the Cobb Energy Performing Arts Centre in Atlanta to play at the "Atlanta Reign Homestand Weekend". Their first match at the homestand was, again, against the Charge on July 6. This time, the Dragons could not take down the Charge, as they fell 1–3. Shanghai's final match of the stage was against the Philadelphia Fusion a day later. With both teams holding a 4–2 record in Stage 3, the winner of the match would qualify for the final spot in the Stage 3 Playoffs; the Dragons came out with a 3–1 win.

As the eighth seed in the Stage 3 Playoffs, the Dragons took on the top-seeded New York Excelsior in quarterfinals. The teams split the first two maps, Oasis and Hollywood, to enter halftime tied up 1–1. As New York stuck to their standard 3-tank, 3-support composition and the Dragons countered by swapping Jin "Youngjin" Young-jin to Doomfist. Compounded with the Dragons ability to shut down main tank Kim "Mano" Dong-gyu, Shanghai found wins in the next two maps and defeated New York by a 3–1 scoreline. For their semifinals match, the Dragons faced the second-seeded Vancouver Titans two days later. DPS Yang "DDing" Jin-hyeok on Pharah controlled the first map, Ilios, to give the Dragons a 1–0 lead, but the Titans came right back to even the score 1–1 going into match break. Shanghai came out of the break on fire, taking a close win on Volskaya Industries, putting up a dominant defensive performance on Havana, and closing out the series on Oasis. The DPS-heavy compositions ran by the Dragons proved to be too much to handle, as the Dragons took a decisive 4–1 victory.

With the win over the Titans, the Dragons made it to their first-ever stage finals, where they took on the third-seeded San Francisco Shock on July 14. The match opened on Oasis, where the Shock opted to play with substitute DPS players STRIKER and Architect and main tank Smurf. The substitution did not pay off, as the Shock dropped the first map. For map two, San Francisco selected Numbani and substituted back in main tank Super and DPS players sinatraa and Rascal. The Dragons completed the map in record time on their attack, while the Shock could not reach the final checkpoint. Down 0–2 going coming out of a match break, the Shock sent the match to Horizon Lunar Colony. Both teams were able to complete the map on their respective attacks, but a dominant performance by Shanghai's DPS Yang "DDing" Jin-hyeok on Pharah helped the Dragons to claim their third map of the series. For the fourth map, the match was sent to Havana; San Francisco failed to complete the map on their attack, but the team put on a clinic on defense, not allowing Shanghai to reach the first checkpoint, and took their first map of the series. The Dragons chose Ilios for the next map, and after a back-and-forth battle, the Shock came out victorious to close the gap to 2–3. The Dragons sent the match to Eichenwalde; after both teams completed the map, the Shock took the match in overtime rounds to even up the series 3–3. For what would be the final map of the match, the Dragons chose Dorado. The Shock attacked first, but they could only reach the first checkpoint before being held by a solid Dragon defense. The Dragons came out in full force; Shanghai's DPS players DDing and Bae "Diem" Min-seong on Phara and Widowmaker put on a clinic of a performance to propel the team past the first checkpoint and further than the Shock's payload distance; the Dragons were crowned Stage 3 Champions.

=== Stage 4 ===
Prior to the start of Stage 4, which would include the implementation of an enforced 2-2-2 role lock by the league, the Dragons acquired flex support Kim "Izayaki" Min-chul from the Los Angeles Valiant.

The Dragons began the final stage with a match against the Vancouver Titans on July 25; the team could not repeat the success they found in the Stage 3 Semifinals and fell 1–3. Two days later, the team took on the Seoul Dynasty. The Dragons found themselves up 2–1 going into the final map, Junkertown, and were able to close out the match, winning 1–3. Shanghai's next match was against the Toronto Defiant on August 1. Toronto DPS Logix's effective performances on Widowmaker and McCree proved to be too much for the Dragons to handle, as they fell 1–2. The team's next match was against the San Francisco Shock, who they had defeated in the Stage 3 Finals, on August 9. The Shock continued to effectively try out new rosters, and the Dragons lost 1–3. Next up, the Dragons took on the Dynasty on August 15; Shanghai fell by a 1–3 scoreline. The team continued to struggle in the new meta, as they fell to the Paris Eternal 1–3 two days later. For their final match of the regular season, the Dragons headed to The Novo in Los Angeles to play in the Kit Kat Rivalry Weekend, hosted by the Los Angeles Valiant, where faced the Hangzhou Spark on August 25. Shanghai crumbled in the matchup, getting swept 0–4 to finish on a five-game losing streak.

== Postseason ==
Finishing in eleventh place in the regular season standings, the Dragons qualified for the Play-In Tournament for the chance to qualify for the season playoffs.

The team took on the tenth-seeded Philadelphia Fusion in the first round on August 30. The Dragon jumped out to an early 2–0 lead after winning on Busan and King's Row, but after the match break, Philadelphia forced a tie on Temple of Anubis and won on Watchpoint: Gibraltar. Shanghai recovered and took a win on Lijiang Tower, but the Fusion struck back with a win on King's Row. The Fusion selected Dorado for what would be the final map of the series; both teams completed the map on their respective attacks, but the Dragons managed to grab the map win in overtime rounds to claim a 4–2 victory and advance to the next round.

Shanghai's next match was against the seventh-seeded London Spitfire a day later. The Spitfire looked dominant in the first two maps, completely shutting down the Dragons, to jump to an early 2–0 lead. However, the Dragon's DPS duo Yang "DDing" Jin-hyeok on Pharah and Jin "YoungJIN" Yong-jin on Doomfist came alive thereafter, helping Shanghai to claim the third map, Hanamura; with a tie on map six, King's Row, the team eventually tie the series 3–3 after seven maps. London sent the match to Ilios for the final map of the series. Both teams managed to take a point in the map, but London's coordination won out in the end, as they handed Shanghai a 3–4 loss in an Overwatch League record 8-map series to end their playoff hopes.

== Final roster ==
2019 Shanghai Dragons roster
Players
Coaches

| Role | No. | Handle | Name | Nationality |
|---|---|---|---|---|
| Damage | 21 | diem | Bae Min-seong | South Korea |
| Damage | 31 | DDing | Yang Jin-hyeok | South Korea |
| Damage | 33 | YOUNGJIN | Jin Young-jin | South Korea |
| Damage | 87 | Diya | Lu Weida | China |
| Tank | 1 | Gamsu | Noh Young-jin | South Korea |
| Tank | 10 | envy | Lee Kang-jae | South Korea |
| Tank | 96 | Geguri | Kim Se-yeon | South Korea |
| Support | 13 | CoMa | Son Kyung-woo | South Korea |
| Support | 66 | Luffy | Yang Sung-hyeon | South Korea |
| Support | 22 | Izayaki | Kim Min-chul | South Korea |

Head coach

- We Seong-hwan

Legend:
- (I) Inactive
- (S) Suspended
- (2W) Two-way player
- Substitute
- (injured) Injury / Illness

Latest roster transaction: July 19, 2019.

=== Transactions ===
Transactions of/for players on the roster during the 2019 regular season:

- On April 12, Dragons moved Lee "Fearless" Eui-Seok to Team CC.
- On May 12, Dragons released Cho "GuardiaN" Joon-hwan.
- On June 18, Dragons acquired Lee "envy" Kang-jae from Toronto Defiant.
- On July 20, Dragons acquired Kim "Izayaki" Min-chul from Los Angeles Valiant.

== Standings ==
=== Record by stage ===
| Stage | Pld | W | L | Pct | MW | ML | MT | MD | Pos |
|---|---|---|---|---|---|---|---|---|---|
| 1 | 7 | 3 | 4 | .429 | 13 | 17 | 0 | -4 | 13 |
| 2 | 7 | 4 | 3 | .571 | 13 | 13 | 2 | ±0 | 8 |
| 3 | 7 | 5 | 2 | .714 | 17 | 12 | 0 | +5 | 8 |
| 4 (Note: No stage playoffs were held for Stage 4.) | 7 | 1 | 6 | .143 | 8 | 19 | 1 | -11 | 18 |
| Overall | 28 | 13 | 15 | .464 | 51 | 61 | 3 | -10 | 11 |
Qualified for playoffs • Qualified for play-in tournament

=== League ===
| Pos | Div | Team | Pld | W | L | PCT | MW | ML | MT | MD | Qualification |
|---|---|---|---|---|---|---|---|---|---|---|---|
| 1 | PAC | Vancouver Titans | 28 | 25 | 3 | 0.893 | 89 | 28 | 0 | +61 | Advance to season playoffs (division leaders) |
| 2 | ATL | New York Excelsior | 28 | 22 | 6 | 0.786 | 78 | 38 | 3 | +40 | Advance to season playoffs (division leaders) |
| 3 | PAC | San Francisco Shock | 28 | 23 | 5 | 0.821 | 92 | 26 | 0 | +66 | Advance to season playoffs |
| 4 | PAC | Hangzhou Spark | 28 | 18 | 10 | 0.643 | 64 | 52 | 4 | +12 | Advance to season playoffs |
| 5 | PAC | Los Angeles Gladiators | 28 | 17 | 11 | 0.607 | 67 | 48 | 3 | +19 | Advance to season playoffs |
| 6 | ATL | Atlanta Reign | 28 | 16 | 12 | 0.571 | 69 | 50 | 1 | +19 | Advance to season playoffs |
| 7 | ATL | London Spitfire | 28 | 16 | 12 | 0.571 | 58 | 52 | 6 | +6 | Advance to play-ins |
| 8 | PAC | Seoul Dynasty | 28 | 15 | 13 | 0.536 | 64 | 50 | 3 | +14 | Advance to play-ins |
| 9 | PAC | Guangzhou Charge | 28 | 15 | 13 | 0.536 | 61 | 57 | 1 | +4 | Advance to play-ins |
| 10 | ATL | Philadelphia Fusion | 28 | 15 | 13 | 0.536 | 57 | 60 | 3 | −3 | Advance to play-ins |
| 11 | PAC | Shanghai Dragons | 28 | 13 | 15 | 0.464 | 51 | 61 | 3 | −10 | Advance to play-ins |
| 12 | PAC | Chengdu Hunters | 28 | 13 | 15 | 0.464 | 55 | 66 | 1 | −11 | Advance to play-ins |
| 13 | PAC | Los Angeles Valiant | 28 | 12 | 16 | 0.429 | 56 | 61 | 4 | −5 | |
| 14 | ATL | Paris Eternal | 28 | 11 | 17 | 0.393 | 46 | 67 | 3 | −21 | |
| 15 | PAC | Dallas Fuel | 28 | 10 | 18 | 0.357 | 43 | 70 | 3 | −27 | |
| 16 | ATL | Houston Outlaws | 28 | 9 | 19 | 0.321 | 47 | 69 | 3 | −22 | |
| 17 | ATL | Toronto Defiant | 28 | 8 | 20 | 0.286 | 39 | 72 | 4 | −33 | |
| 18 | ATL | Washington Justice | 28 | 8 | 20 | 0.286 | 39 | 72 | 6 | −33 | |
| 19 | ATL | Boston Uprising | 28 | 8 | 20 | 0.286 | 41 | 78 | 2 | −37 | |
| 20 | ATL | Florida Mayhem | 28 | 6 | 22 | 0.214 | 36 | 75 | 5 | −39 | |

Source: The Overwatch League
Rules for classification: 1) winning percentage; 2) map differential; 3) head-to-head record; 4) head-to-head map differential

== Game log ==
=== Regular season ===
2019 game log (Regular season record: 13–15)
Stage 1 (3–4)

| 1 | February 14 | Shanghai Dragons | 1 | – | 3 | Hangzhou Spark | Burbank, CA |
| | | Recap | | | | | Blizzard Arena |
| | | 1 | Busan | | | 2 | |
| | | 1 | Hollywood | | | 2 | |
| | | 3 | Horizon Lunar Colony | | | 2 | |
| | | 1 | Rialto | | | 2 | |

| 2 | February 16 | Vancouver Titans | 4 | – | 0 | Shanghai Dragons | Burbank, CA |
| | | Recap | | | | | Blizzard Arena |
| | | 2 | Busan | | | 1 | |
| | | 1 | Hollywood | | | 0 | |
| | | 3 | Temple of Anubis | | | 2 | |
| | | 2 | Dorado | | | 1 | |

| 3 | February 22 | Shanghai Dragons | 3 | – | 1 | Boston Uprising | Burbank, CA |
| | | Recap | | | | | Blizzard Arena |
| | | 2 | Ilios | | | 0 | |
| | | 4 | King's Row | | | 3 | |
| | | 5 | Horizon Lunar Colony | | | 4 | |
| | | 0 | Rialto | | | 1 | |

| 4 | March 01 | Shanghai Dragons | 4 | – | 0 | Chengdu Hunters | Burbank, CA |
| | | Recap | | | | | Blizzard Arena |
| | | 2 | Busan | | | 1 | |
| | | 3 | Numbani | | | 2 | |
| | | 5 | Volskaya Industries | | | 4 | |
| | | 2 | Dorado | | | 1 | |

| 5 | March 02 | Shanghai Dragons | 2 | – | 3 | Dallas Fuel | Burbank, CA |
| | | Recap | | | | | Blizzard Arena |
| | | 0 | Ilios | | | 2 | |
| | | 3 | Numbani | | | 2 | |
| | | 5 | Volskaya Industries | | | 4 | |
| | | 4 | Dorado | | | 5 | |
| | | 0 | Nepal | | | 2 | |

| 6 | March 09 | Dallas Fuel | 4 | – | 0 | Shanghai Dragons | Burbank, CA |
| | | Recap | | | | | Blizzard Arena |
| | | 2 | Nepal | | | 1 | |
| | | 3 | Hollywood | | | 2 | |
| | | 3 | Temple of Anubis | | | 2 | |
| | | 5 | Route 66 | | | 4 | |

| 7 | March 10 | London Spitfire | 2 | – | 3 | Shanghai Dragons | Burbank, CA |
| | | Recap | | | | | Blizzard Arena |
| | | 2 | Nepal | | | 0 | |
| | | 0 | King's Row | | | 3 | |
| | | 1 | Temple of Anubis | | | 0 | |
| | | 0 | Route 66 | | | 3 | |
| | | 1 | Ilios | | | 2 | |

Stage 2 (4–3)

| 8 | April 04 | Shanghai Dragons | 1 | – | 3 | Los Angeles Gladiators | Burbank, CA |
| | 7:30 pm PST | Recap | | | | | Blizzard Arena |
| | | 2 | Busan | | | 0 | |
| | | 1 | Temple of Anubis | | | 2 | |
| | | 3 | King's Row | | | 4 | |
| | | 0 | Watchpoint: Gibraltar | | | 1 | |

| 9 | April 06 | New York Excelsior | 3 | – | 0 | Shanghai Dragons | Burbank, CA |
| | 3:30 pm PST | Recap | | | | | Blizzard Arena |
| | | 2 | Oasis | | | 1 | |
| | | 1 | Hanamura | | | 1 | |
| | | 3 | Eichenwalde | | | 2 | |
| | | 1 | Watchpoint: Gibraltar | | | 0 | |

| 10 | April 12 | Chengdu Hunters | 1 | – | 3 | Shanghai Dragons | Burbank, CA |
| | 8:30 pm PST | Recap | | | | | Blizzard Arena |
| | | 0 | Lijiang Tower | | | 2 | |
| | | 1 | Paris | | | 0 | |
| | | 2 | King's Row | | | 3 | |
| | | 2 | Junkertown | | | 3 | |

| 11 | April 20 | Shanghai Dragons | 3 | – | 1 | Florida Mayhem | Burbank, CA |
| | 1:30 pm PST | Recap | | | | | Blizzard Arena |
| | | 2 | Lijiang Tower | | | 1 | |
| | | 3 | Hanamura | | | 4 | |
| | | 3 | Eichenwalde | | | 1 | |
| | | 3 | Rialto | | | 0 | |

| 12 | April 21 | Houston Outlaws | 0 | – | 3 | Shanghai Dragons | Burbank, CA |
| | 1:30 pm PST | Recap | | | | | Blizzard Arena |
| | | 0 | Oasis | | | 2 | |
| | | 0 | Temple of Anubis | | | 0 | |
| | | 0 | Blizzard World | | | 1 | |
| | | 2 | Junkertown | | | 3 | |

| 13 | May 03 | Shanghai Dragons | 3 | – | 1 | Washington Justice | Burbank, CA |
| | 8:30 pm PST | Recap | | | | | Blizzard Arena |
| | | 2 | Busan | | | 0 | |
| | | 2 | Paris | | | 1 | |
| | | 0 | Blizzard World | | | 1 | |
| | | 2 | Watchpoint: Gibraltar | | | 1 | |

| 14 | May 05 | Shanghai Dragons | 0 | – | 4 | San Francisco Shock | Burbank, CA |
| | 3:00 pm PST | Recap | | | | | Blizzard Arena |
| | | 1 | Oasis | | | 2 | |
| | | 4 | Paris | | | 5 | |
| | | 4 | King's Row | | | 5 | |
| | | 4 | Rialto | | | 5 | |

Stage 3 (5–2)

| 15 | June 06 | Los Angeles Valiant | 1 | – | 3 | Shanghai Dragons | Burbank, CA |
| | 9:15 pm PST | Details | | | | | Blizzard Arena |
| | | 0 | Oasis | | | 2 | |
| | | 3 | Paris | | | 4 | |
| | | 0 | Numbani | | | 3 | |
| | | 1 | Watchpoint: Gibraltar | | | 0 | |

| 16 | June 14 | Shanghai Dragons | 3 | – | 2 | Atlanta Reign | Burbank, CA |
| | 5:45 pm PST | Details | | | | | Blizzard Arena |
| | | 0 | Oasis | | | 2 | |
| | | 5 | Volskaya Industries | | | 4 | |
| | | 4 | Numbani | | | 5 | |
| | | 2 | Havana | | | 1 | |
| | | 2 | Nepal | | | 0 | |

| 17 | June 20 | Shanghai Dragons | 1 | – | 3 | Los Angeles Valiant | Burbank, CA |
| | 9:15 pm PST | Details | | | | | Blizzard Arena |
| | | 1 | Nepal | | | 2 | |
| | | 2 | Horizon Lunar Colony | | | 1 | |
| | | 2 | Eichenwalde | | | 3 | |
| | | 4 | Dorado | | | 5 | |

| 18 | June 21 | Los Angeles Gladiators | 1 | – | 3 | Shanghai Dragons | Burbank, CA |
| | 7:30 pm PST | Details | | | | | Blizzard Arena |
| | | 2 | Oasis | | | 0 | |
| | | 3 | Volskaya Industries | | | 4 | |
| | | 2 | Eichenwalde | | | 3 | |
| | | 0 | Dorado | | | 1 | |

| 19 | June 29 | Shanghai Dragons | 3 | – | 1 | Guangzhou Charge | Burbank, CA |
| | 5:15 pm PST | Details | | | | | Blizzard Arena |
| | | 2 | Ilios | | | 0 | |
| | | 2 | Paris | | | 0 | |
| | | 1 | Hollywood | | | 2 | |
| | | 4 | Watchpoint: Gibraltar | | | 3 | |

| 20 | July 06 | Guangzhou Charge | 3 | – | 1 | Shanghai Dragons | Atlanta, GA |
| | 1:45 pm PST | Details | | | | | Cobb Energy Center |
| | | 2 | Nepal | | | 1 | |
| | | 6 | Horizon Lunar Colony | | | 5 | |
| | | 3 | Numbani | | | 2 | |
| | | 0 | Havana | | | 1 | |

| 21 | July 07 | Philadelphia Fusion | 1 | – | 3 | Shanghai Dragons | Atlanta, GA |
| | 9:00 am PST | Details | | | | | Cobb Energy Center |
| | | 1 | Ilios | | | 2 | |
| | | 3 | Volskaya Industries | | | 4 | |
| | | 4 | Hollywood | | | 3 | |
| | | 0 | Dorado | | | 2 | |

Stage 4 (1–6)

| 22 | July 25 | Shanghai Dragons | 1 | – | 3 | Vancouver Titans | Burbank, CA |
| | 9:10 pm PST | Details | | | | | Blizzard Arena |
| | | 2 | Lijiang Tower | | | 0 | |
| | | 2 | Temple of Anubis | | | 3 | |
| | | 0 | King's Row | | | 1 | |
| | | 4 | Junkertown | | | 5 | |

| 23 | July 28 | Shanghai Dragons | 3 | – | 1 | Seoul Dynasty | Burbank, CA |
| | 12:00 noon PST | Details | | | | | Blizzard Arena |
| | | 2 | Ilios | | | 0 | |
| | | 2 | Temple of Anubis | | | 1 | |
| | | 0 | Hollywood | | | 1 | |
| | | 3 | Junkertown | | | 1 | |

| 24 | August 01 | Shanghai Dragons | 1 | – | 2 | Toronto Defiant | Burbank, CA |
| | 7:30 pm PST | Details | | | | | Blizzard Arena |
| | | 2 | Lijiang Tower | | | 1 | |
| | | 1 | Volskaya Industries | | | 2 | |
| | | 3 | Hollywood | | | 3 | |
| | | 3 | Route 66 | | | 4 | |

| 25 | August 09 | San Francisco Shock | 3 | – | 1 | Shanghai Dragons | Burbank, CA |
| | 7:30 pm PST | Details | | | | | Blizzard Arena |
| | | 2 | Busan | | | 1 | |
| | | 4 | Volskaya Industries | | | 3 | |
| | | 1 | Blizzard World | | | 2 | |
| | | 3 | Route 66 | | | 1 | |

| 26 | August 15 | Seoul Dynasty | 3 | – | 1 | Shanghai Dragons | Burbank, CA |
| | 7:30 pm PST | Details | | | | | Blizzard Arena |
| | | 2 | Ilios | | | 1 | |
| | | 2 | Hanamura | | | 0 | |
| | | 1 | Blizzard World | | | 0 | |
| | | 0 | Route 66 | | | 2 | |

| 27 | August 17 | Paris Eternal | 3 | – | 1 | Shanghai Dragons | Burbank, CA |
| | 12:00 noon PST | Details | | | | | Blizzard Arena |
| | | 2 | Lijiang Tower | | | 0 | |
| | | 3 | Hanamura | | | 4 | |
| | | 3 | King's Row | | | 2 | |
| | | 3 | Havana | | | 2 | |

| 28 | August 25 | Hangzhou Spark | 4 | – | 0 | Shanghai Dragons | Los Angeles, CA |
| | 12:00 noon PST | Details | | | | | The Novo |
| | | 2 | Busan | | | 0 | |
| | | 2 | Volskaya Industries | | | 1 | |
| | | 3 | Hollywood | | | 2 | |
| | | 3 | Havana | | | 1 | |

=== Playoffs ===
2019 playoff game log
Stage 2 Playoffs (0–1)

| Quarterfinals | May 09 | Shanghai Dragons | 1 | – | 3 | San Francisco Shock | Burbank, CA |
| | 6:00 pm PST | Recap | | | | | Blizzard Arena |
| | | 2 | Oasis | | | 1 | |
| | | 2 | Eichenwalde | | | 3 | |
| | | 2 | Paris | | | 4 | |
| | | 1 | Rialto | | | 3 | |

Stage 3 Playoffs (3–0)

| Quarterfinals | July 11 | Shanghai Dragons | 3 | – | 1 | New York Excelsior | Burbank, CA |
| | 8:00 pm PST | Details | | | | | Blizzard Arena |
| | | 2 | Oasis | | | 0 | |
| | | 1 | Hollywood | | | 2 | |
| | | 4 | Volskaya Industries | | | 3 | |
| | | 3 | Watchpoint: Gibraltar | | | 1 | |

| Semifinals | July 13 | Shanghai Dragons | 4 | – | 1 | Vancouver Titans | Burbank, CA |
| | 7:00 pm PST | Details | | | | | Blizzard Arena |
| | | 2 | Ilios | | | 0 | |
| | | 3 | Numbani | | | 4 | |
| | | 4 | Volskaya Industries | | | 3 | |
| | | 1 | Havana | | | 0 | |
| | | 2 | Oasis | | | 1 | |

| Finals | July 14 | Shanghai Dragons | 4 | – | 3 | San Francisco Shock | Burbank, CA |
| | 1:00 pm PST | Details | | | | | Blizzard Arena |
| | | 2 | Oasis | | | 1 | |
| | | 3 | Numbani | | | 2 | |
| | | 4 | Horizon Lunar Colony | | | 3 | |
| | | 0 | Havana | | | 2 | |
| | | 1 | Ilios | | | 2 | |
| | | 3 | Eichenwalde | | | 4 | |
| | | 2 | Dorado | | | 1 | |

Play-In Tournament (1–1)

| Quarterfinals | August 30 | Shanghai Dragons | 4 | – | 2 | Philadelphia Fusion | Burbank, CA |
| | 9:00 pm PST | Details | | | | | Blizzard Arena |
| | | 2 | Busan | | | 1 | |
| | | 5 | King's Row | | | 4 | |
| | | 3 | Temple of Anubis | | | 3 | |
| | | 3 | Watchpoint: Gibraltar | | | 4 | |
| | | 2 | Lijiang Tower | | | 1 | |
| | | 1 | King's Row | | | 3 | |
| | | 5 | Dorado | | | 4 | |

| Semifinals | August 31 | Shanghai Dragons | 3 | – | 4 | London Spitfire | Burbank, CA |
| | 12:00 noon PST | Details | | | | | Blizzard Arena |
| | | 0 | Busan | | | 2 | |
| | | 0 | Numbani | | | 1 | |
| | | 1 | Hanamura | | | 0 | |
| | | 4 | Watchpoint: Gibraltar | | | 5 | |
| | | 2 | Lijiang Tower | | | 1 | |
| | | 3 | King's Row | | | 3 | |
| | | 3 | Dorado | | | 1 | |
| | | 1 | Ilios | | | 2 | |
