= Vancouver Titans =

Canadian professional esports team

- Founded: September 7, 2018
- Last season: 2023 Overwatch League season
- League: Overwatch League
- Region: West
- Team history: Vancouver Titans (2018–2023)
- Based in: Vancouver, Canada
- Colours
- Owner: Canucks Sports & Entertainment

Uniforms

The Vancouver Titans were a professional Overwatch esports team based in Vancouver, British Columbia, Canada. The Titans competed in the now defunct Overwatch League (OWL) as a member of the league's West region. Founded in 2018, the Vancouver Titans began play as one of eight expansion teams in 2019 and is one of two professional Overwatch teams in Canada (the other, Toronto Defiant). The team is owned by Canucks Sports & Entertainment, owners of the Vancouver Canucks of the National Hockey League (NHL) and the Vancouver Warriors of the National Lacrosse League (NLL).

For their inaugural season, the Titans signed a roster consisting of mostly members from Korean Overwatch Contenders team RunAway. In their first year, they reached all three of the stage playoffs, made two stage final appearances, won one stage title, finished at the top of the regular season standings, and reached the 2019 Grand Finals, where they ultimately lost to the San Francisco Shock. However, conflicts between players and management resulted in the Titans organization parting ways with their entire roster at the beginning of the 2020 season. Since then, the Titans have failed to reach any playoffs and had their worst season in 2021, ending it with a 1–15 regular season record.

== History ==
On September 7, 2018, Activision Blizzard announced that NHL's Vancouver Canucks ownership Aquilini Group had purchased a slot for the Vancouver-based franchise for a reported $30 million to $60 million. "Esports has seen extraordinary success and continues to be one of the fastest growing industries in the world," said Aquilini Group managing director Francesco Aquilini in a statement. "We can't wait to launch the team in Vancouver." On October 18, the team announced they had partnered with Canadian esports organization Luminosity Gaming to add esports expertise to the organization.

On December 1, a video revealed the Vancouver Titans' brand during the second intermission of a Vancouver Canucks game, concluding with "Today, we release the Titans." The team also announced that it had signed all eight members of the Korean Overwatch Contenders champions RunAway and Hwang "Pajion" Ji-sub as the team's head coach.

=== 2019: Grand Finals appearance ===
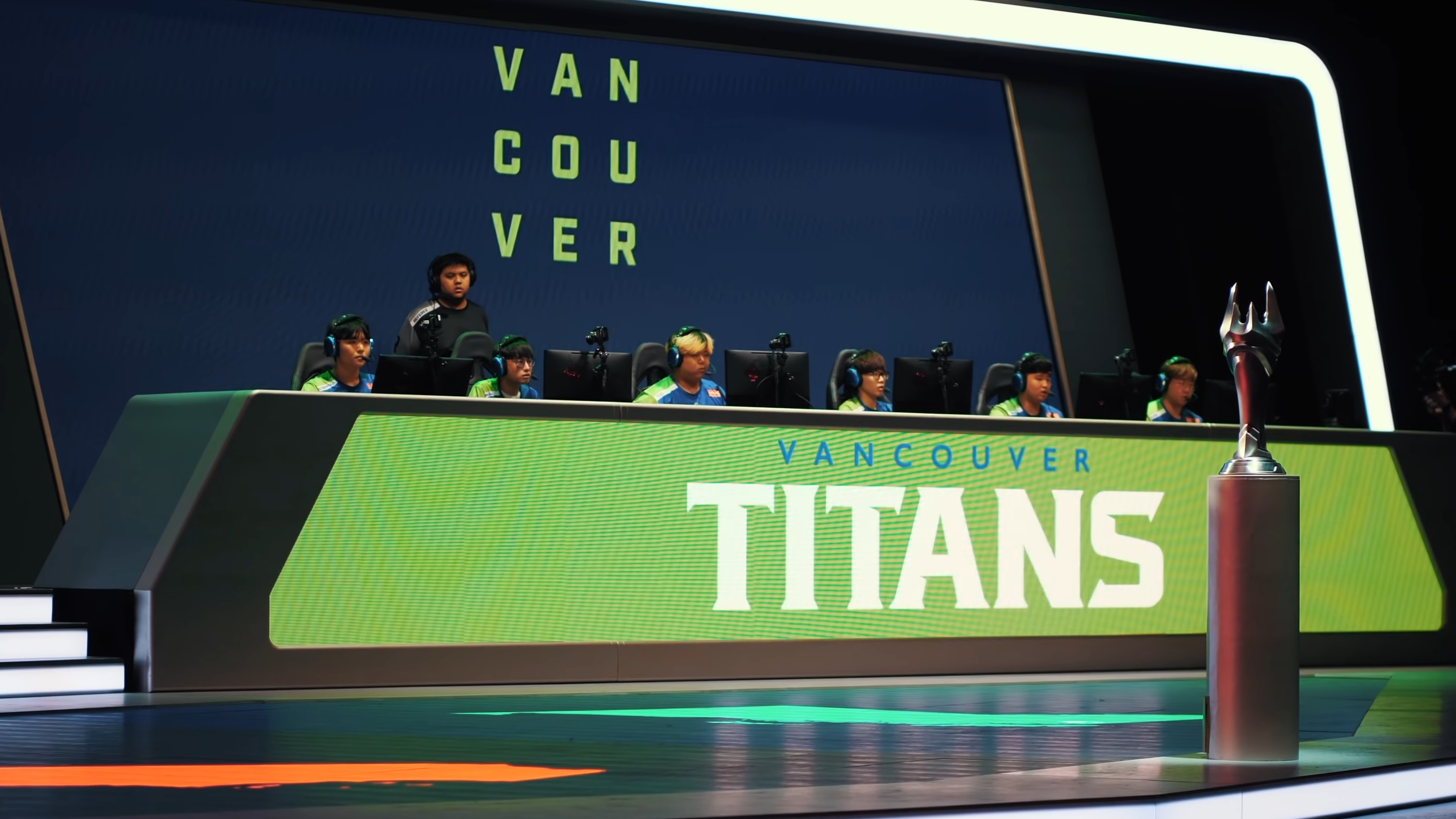
Titans during the 2019 Grand Finals

Vancouver's first OWL match was a 4–0 sweep over the Shanghai Dragons. Behind a core starting lineup of Park "Bumper" Sang-beom, Choi "JJANU" Hyun-woo, Kim "Haksal" Hyo-jong, Seo "SeoMinSoo" Min-soo, Kim "SLIME" Seong-jun, and Lee "Twilight" Ju-seok, the Titans posted a 7–0 record in the first stage of the season. The team capped off the stage running through the Stage 1 playoffs, going on to defeat the San Francisco Shock, 4–3, in the Stage 1 finals. The Titans reached the Stage 2 finals, going undefeated in the process, where they again faced the Shock. However, their undefeated streak came to an end, as they lost the match, 2–4. The Titans recorded an OWL record 19-game regular season winning streak, which was snapped Stage 3, as they lost their first regular season match on June 23, against the Los Angeles Valiant. While they qualified for the Stage 3 playoffs, Vancouver was defeated by the Shanghai Dragons in the semifinals round. The league introduced a 2-2-2 role lock for Stage 4; on August 16, the Titans signed tank player Hwang "TiZi" Jang-hyeon, who was a former player for RunAway. Vancouver ended the regular season with a league-best 25–3 record and the top seed in the season playoffs. Haksal and Twilight were awarded Role Star commendations on the season; Haksal was also named the OWL Rookie of the Year. In the season playoffs, Bumper and TiZi split playing time, with TiZi taking more time as the playoffs went on. Vancouver ran through the upper bracket of the season playoffs, ultimately defeating the New York Excelsior, 4–3, in the upper bracket finals to advance to the Grand Finals. In a rematch of the Stage 1 and Stage 2 finals, the Titans faced the Shock in the Grand Finals on September 29. However, the Titans were held without winning a single map in the series, losing 0–4, and finished as the league's runners-up.

=== 2020–present: Roster collapse and years of rebuilding ===
Following the 2019 season, the Vancouver Titans parted ways with four of their players, including Bumper and TiZi. The team signed two former Seoul Dynasty players in tank Baek "Fissure" Chan-hyung and support Ryu "ryujehong" Je-hong. The team began their season living in Vancouver and practicing at a gaming facility at Adamas Esports Training and Performance at Fortius Sport & Health. With the emergence of the COVID-19 pandemic, the Overwatch League shifted all matches to an online format. The Titans players requested to move back to South Korea amid the pandemic, which was approved by Aquilini management. However, Aquilini would not fund the team a team house, nor would they provide a training facility for them to practice at. In South Korea, the Titans players encountered technical difficulties playing from their homes and eventually boycotted practice. According to Tim Holloway, esports director of Aquilini Group, the Titans originally planned to compete in the league's newly formed Asia region, but the time difference "made it difficult for management and the home fanbase to connect with the team and technical challenges for the players playing from home further exacerbated the situation." Unable to resolve differences between players and management, the Titans organization parted ways with tank JJANU and head coach Pajion on April 30 and released the rest of their roster on May 6. Days later, the Titans announced the hiring of Steven "Flubby" Coronel as their new head coach and signed a roster consisting entirely of the players from North American Overwatch Contenders team Second Wind. The team struggled throughout the season, finishing with a 6–15 regular season record. A 0–3 loss to the Washington Justice in the North America play-in tournament on September 3 ended the team's season.

Prior to the start of the 2021 season, the Titans retained half of their roster from the previous season and picked up underperforming players who were dropped or traded from other OWL teams to fill their holes. The team did not outperform expectations, going on a 12-game losing streak to start the season. Vancouver picked up its first win of the season on August 6, 2021, with a 3–0 win over the Boston Uprising — their first win in nearly a year. The Titans ended the season with a 1–15 record, marking their worst finish in franchise history.

After an abysmal 2021 season, the Titans again dropped their entire roster. The team picked up seven players, forming a mixed nationality roster, in the offseason, including former Toronto Defiant hitscan player Luka "Aspire" Rolovic and former Atlanta Reign support player Petja "Masaa" Kantanen.

== Team identity ==
On December 1, 2018, the Aquilini Group officially unveiled the Vancouver Titans brand. The name Titans is "indicative of the traits associated with the Sasquatch – a powerful, imposing, and mythical being." The logo features the Pacific Northwest folklore figure with a 'V' in the nose and a mountain range on the top of its head in the team's colours of blue, green, and white. The colours represent the greenery that surrounds the Pacific Ocean in the Vancouver area and are similar of that of the Vancouver Canucks' official colours. "In choosing our identity we wanted to introduce a team that would resonate with fans in the Pacific Northwest," Aquilini Group managing editor Francesco Aquilini said in a statement. "With a local feel and an experienced, skilled team, we are ready and can't wait to have the Titans compete at the highest level in esports."

== Partnerships ==
In August 2019, the Vancouver Titans announced a partnership with Circle K on limited edition souvenir cups that featured images of Titans players Twilight, Haksal, Bumper, and SeoMinSoo.

== Personnel ==
=== Current roster ===
Vancouver Titans roster
Players
Coaches

| Role | No. | Handle | Name | Nationality |
|---|---|---|---|---|
| Damage | | Sugarfree | Hijada, Kamden | United States |
| Damage | | HeeSang | Chae Hee-sang | South Korea |
| Tank | | Punk | Gilchrist, Leyton | Australia |
| Support | | Faith | Kim Hong-gyu | South Korea |
| Support | | Crimzo | Hernandez, William | Canada |

Head coach

- Valentin "Ascoft" Wulfman

Legend:
- (I) Inactive
- (S) Suspended
- (2W) Two-way player
- Substitute
- (injured) Injury / Illness

Latest roster transaction: July 11, 2023.

=== Head coaches ===
| Handle | Name | Seasons | Record | Notes | Ref. |
|---|---|---|---|---|---|
| Pajion | Hwang Ji-sub | 2019–2020 | 27–5 (.844) | Released after four games in 2020. | |
| Flubby | Steven Coronel | 2020–2022 | 5–34 (.128) | Released after six games in 2022. | |
| dpei | David Pei | 2022 | 5–13 (.278) | | |
| Ascoft | Valentin Wulfman | 2023–present | 8–8 (.500) | | |

== Awards and records ==
=== Seasons overview ===
| Season | P | W | L | W% | Finish | Playoffs |
|---|---|---|---|---|---|---|
| 2019 | 28 | 25 | 3 | .893 | 1st, Pacific | Lost in Grand Finals, 0–4 (Shock) |
| 2020 | 21 | 6 | 15 | .286 | 10th, North America | Did not qualify |
| 2021 | 16 | 1 | 15 | .063 | 12th, West | Did not qualify |
| 2022 | 24 | 5 | 19 | .208 | 11th, West | Did not qualify |
| 2023 | 16 | 8 | 8 | .500 | 5th, West | Did not qualify |

=== Individual accomplishments ===
Rookie of the Year

- Haksal (Kim Hyo-jung) – 2019

Role Star selections

- Haksal (Kim Hyo-jung) – 2019
- Twilight (Lee Ju-seok) – 2019

All-Star Game selections

- Bumper (Park Sang-beom) – 2019
- Haksal (Kim Hyo-jong) – 2019
- SLIME (Kim Seong-jun) – 2019
- Twilight (Lee Ju-seok) – 2019
- sHockWave (Niclas Jensen) – 2020

All-Star Game head coaches

- Pajion (Hwang Ji-sub) – 2019
