= Hangzhou Spark =

Chinese professional esports team

Hangzhou Spark 杭州闪电
- Founded: 7 September 2018
- League: Overwatch League
- Region: East
- Team history: Hangzhou Spark (2018–present)
- Based in: Hangzhou, China
- Colors
- Owner: Rui Chen
- President: Youyou "So" Chen
- General manager: Youyou "So" Chen
- Affiliation: Bilibili Gaming
- Main sponsor: MG Motor
- Website: Official website

Uniforms

Hangzhou Spark
- Simplified Chinese: 杭州闪电
- Traditional Chinese: 杭州閃電
Transcriptions
Standard Mandarin
- Hanyu Pinyin: Hángzhōu Shǎndiàn

Hangzhou Spark (simplified Chinese: 杭州闪电; traditional Chinese: 杭州閃電; pinyin: Hángzhōu Shǎndiàn) was a Chinese professional Overwatch esports team based in Hangzhou, Zhejiang. The Spark competed in the Overwatch League (OWL) as a member of the league's East region up until the Overwatch League was shut down on 23 January 2024. Founded in 2018, Hangzhou Spark began play as one of eight expansion teams in 2019 and was one of four professional Overwatch teams based in China. The team is owned by Bilibili, a Chinese video sharing website; the company also owns Bilibili Gaming, who operate their own Overwatch division that competed in Overwatch Contenders as an academy team for the Spark.

== Franchise history ==
=== OWL expansion ===
On 7 September 2018, Activision Blizzard announced that Chinese video sharing website Bilibili had purchased an expansion team based in Hangzhou for Overwatch League's second season. On 14 November, the team revealed their team name as Hangzhou Spark.

On 16 November, the Spark revealed their new head coach, Lee "Mask" Mu-ho. In the following week, the Spark revealed their 10-man inaugural roster through a series of Twitter posts, consisting of players from different Chinese and Korean Contenders teams.

=== Early years: 2019–present ===
Hangzhou's first regular season OWL match was a 3–1 victory over the Shanghai Dragons on 14 February 2019, in the 2019 season. The Spark qualified for both the Stage 2 and Stage 3 playoffs, but failed to reach the finals in either one. Hangzhou struggled at the beginning of Stage 4, which was the beginning of the enforced 2-2-2 role lock by the league, after suspending their starting damage player Cai "Krystal" Shilong — an event that later led to the Spark's parent company Bilibili taking legal actions. The team lost their first three matches of the stage but recovered by winning their final four matches, ending the regular season with an 18–10 record and the fourth seed in the season playoffs. The Spark began their playoff run with a 3–4 loss to the Los Angeles Gladiators, sending them to the lower bracket. The team defeated the Seoul Dynasty, 4–1, in the first round of the lower bracket, followed by a 4–0 sweep over the Atlanta Reign in the second round. The Spark's season came to an end after a 0–4 loss to the San Francisco Shock.

Prior to the 2020 season, the Spark made minor changes to their roster, departing with two players and promoting two from their academy team Bilibili Gaming. In the first two regional midseason tournaments of the 2020 season, the May Melee and Summer Showdown, Hangzhou lost 0–3 in the quarterfinals each time. Following, Hangzhou released head coach Lee "Mask" Mu-ho and promoted assistant coach Huang "Pajion" Ji-sub to head coach. In the third, and final, midseason tournament, the Countdown Cup, the Spark reached the finals, but lost to the Shanghai Dragons. The team finished the regular season with a 12–10 record. Hangzhou fell in the Asian play-in tournament to the Seoul Dynasty, 0–3, ending their season.

Looking to improve from their 2020 season, the Spark nearly instantly maxed out their roster with rookies in the 2021 offseason. After an 0–2 start to the 2021 season, the Spark released head coach Hwang "paJion" Ji-sub and promoted Hwang "Andante" Jae-hong to interim head coach. In the first week of June, the Spark hosted the first live OWL events of the 2021 season, marking the first time that live OWL events took place in China. Head coach Hwang "Andante" Jae-hong was released on 15 July 2021, due to "irreconcilable differences between Andante's and the rest of Spark's ideals," leaving assistant coach assistant coach Chen "U4" Congshan as the only member on the coaching staff. The Spark finished the regular season in fifth place in the Eastern region. Prior to the start of the postseason, starting Spark support player Lee "MCD" Jeong-ho was dropped from the team following reports that he had made xenophobic remarks towards a Chinese player. Their season ended after they were eliminated in the play-in tournament tournament semifinals, losing to the Philadelphia Fusion.

== Team identity ==
On 14 November 2018, Bilibili officially announced the brand of their franchise, the Hangzhou Spark. The name "Spark" symbolizes the immense speed and power electricity, as well as the "electric nature and creative spark" of the Bilibili brand.

The logo is in the team's official colors of pink, white, and blue. It depicts a hand-gesture in shape of a gun with electricity emerging from it and is a reference to Mikoto Misaka from A Certain Scientific Railgun. The official colors are vibrant in nature to reflect the fast-growing nature of Hangzhou.

== Personnel ==
=== Current roster ===
Hangzhou Spark roster
Players	Coaches
Role / No. / Handle / Name / Nationality	Head coach: Vacant
Legend: (I) Inactive; (S) Suspended; (2W) Two-way player; Substitute; (injured) Injury / Illness	Latest roster transaction: 29 October 2023.

=== Head coaches ===
Handle	Name	Seasons	Record	Notes	Ref.
Mask	Lee Mu-ho	2019–2020	26–21 (.553)	Released after 19 games in 2020.	
paJion	Huang Ji-sub	2020–2021	2–2 (.500)	Released after two games in 2021.	
Andante	Hwang Jae-hong	2021	5–2 (.714)	Interim head coach. Released after seven games in 2021.	
Changgoon	Park Chang-geun	2022	11–13 (.458)		
RUI	Wang Xingrui	2023	3-2 (.600)	Released after five games in 2023.	
Creed	Yan Xiao	2023	6-2 (.750)		

== Awards and records ==
=== Seasons overview ===
Season	P	W	L	W%	Finish	Playoffs
2019	28	18	10	.643	3rd, Pacific	Lost in Lower Round 3, 0–4 (Shock)
2020	21	10	11	.476	6th, Asia	Did not qualify
2021	16	7	9	.438	5th, East	Did not qualify
2022	24	11	13	.458	4th, East	Lost in Lower Round 4, 1–3 (Shock)

=== Individual accomplishments ===
Role Star selections

- guxue (Qiulin Xu) – 2019
- iDK (Park Ho-jin) – 2019

All-Star Game selections

- guxue (Qiulin Xu) – 2019

== Academy team ==
On 15 March 2019, the Hangzhou Spark announced their official academy team, Bilibili Gaming (BLG), and full roster. The team competes in Contenders China.
