= 2019 Guangzhou Charge season =

Overwatch League team season

- Head coach: Cho Hyo-Jin
- General manager: I-Ting Liu
- Owner: Zhong Naixiong
- Division: Pacific

Results
- Record: 15–13 (.536)
- Place: Pacific: 6th; League: 9th
- Stage 1 Playoffs: Did not qualify
- Stage 2 Playoffs: Did not qualify
- Stage 3 Playoffs: Did not qualify
- Season Playoffs: Did not qualify

The 2019 Guangzhou Charge season was the first season of Guangzhou Charge's existence in the Overwatch League as one of eight expansion franchises added for the 2019 season. The team had a subpar performance throughout the first three stages of the season, posting a 9–12 record through 21 matches with no stage playoff appearances. After the implementation of an enforced 2-2-2 role lock by the league, the Charge flourished, losing only one match in their final seven matches to give them a 15–13 record for the season. Finishing in 9th place in the overall standings, Guangzhou qualified for the Play-In Tournament, where they defeated the Chengdu Hunters in the first round, 4–1. However, they were unable to make it season playoffs, as they fell to the Seoul Dynasty by a score of 1–4 the following day.

== Preceding offseason ==
Charge acquired Choi "Hotba" Hong-Jun from Philadelphia Fusion on 17 October. In mid-November, Charge announced nine more players signed for their inaugural roster:

- Yiliang "Eileen" Ou,
- Finley "Kyb" Adisi,
- Lee "Happy" Jeong-woo,
- Charlie "nero" Zwarg,
- Oh "Rio" Seung-pyo,
- Kim "shu" Jin-seo,
- Kim "Chara" Jung-yeon,
- Chen "Onlywish" Lizhen, and
- Lee "Rise" Won-jae.

Charge signed Cho "J1N" Hyo-jin as the team's head coach on 3 December.

== Regular season ==
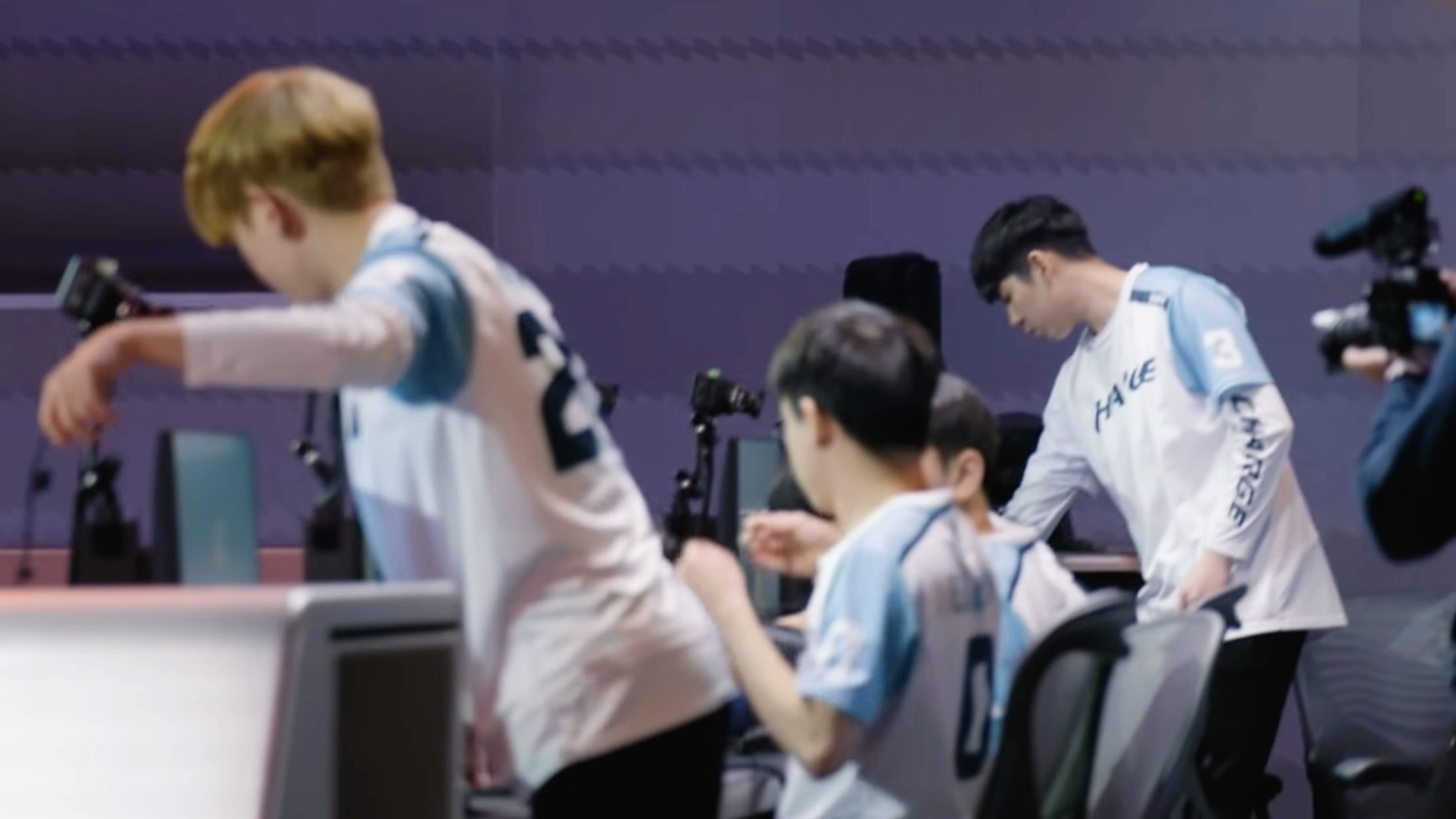
Guangzhou Charge setting up prior to their match against Dallas Fuel in Stage 1.

=== Stage 1 ===
Charge opened their 2019 season on 15 February with a loss to fellow Chinese expansion franchise Chengdu Hunters. The team's first Overwatch League win came a week later in a 4–0 sweep over Dallas Fuel. Two days later, Charge lost in an overtime match to Vancouver Titans. Guangzhou took both of their matches week three over Florida Mayhem and Los Angeles Valiant to bring their record to 3–2. After dropping their week four match to Los Angeles Gladiators, Charge's final match of the stage was a rematch against Titans. Needing a win to secure a spot in the Stage 1 Playoffs, Charge was swept by Titans, ending the stage with a 3–4 record and out of playoff contention.

=== Stage 2 ===
Charge could not find much success in Stage 2. Charge did not find a single map victory through their first four matches of the stage, getting swept 0–4 in each match. Guangzhou found their first map win in week three against Hangzhou Spark, but Spark took the match 3–2. The team faced Atlanta Reign the following week. Charge found their first win of the stage, taking the match 3–1; with a combined total score of 33 points, the match became the highest scoring game in Overwatch League history. Charge took a win in their final match of the stage, defeating Houston Outlaws, and ending the stage with a disappointing 2–5 record.

=== Stage 3 ===
The Charge opened Stage 3 on 6 June strong with a 3–1 victory over the Chengdu Hunters. Two days later, they faced the Seoul Dynasty; Guangzhou was dominated throughout the match and was swept 0–4. The following week, the Charge took on the Los Angeles Valiant. The match was riddled with little mistakes by the Charge; that, and their inability to change strategies throughout, led to a 1–3 loss. Looking to rebound from the two straight losses, the Charge next took on the Toronto Defiant on 22 June. The Charge took the first map, Ilios in convincing fashion and carried that momentum throughout the match to sweep Toronto 4–0. The team's next match was against the Shanghai Dragons a week later; Charge lost the match 1–3. For the final week of Stage 3, Guangzhou headed to the Cobb Energy Performing Arts Centre in Atlanta to play at the "Atlanta Reign Homestand Weekend". Their first match at the homestand was, again, against the Dragons on 6 July. This time, the Charge took down the Dragons, winning 3–1. The following day, the team took on the Washington Justice. Guangzhou closed out the stage on a high note, as they dominated throughout the match and won 4–0.

=== Stage 4 ===
Prior to the start of Stage 4, which would include the implementation of an enforced 2-2-2 role lock by the League, the Charge made multiple roster moves. Guangzhou traded DPS Finley "Kyb" Adisi to the Philadelphia Fusion in exchange for tank Joona "Fragi" Laine on 17 July. The same day, the Charge acquired off-tank Kim "Bischu" Hyung-seok from the Los Angeles Gladiators in exchange for an undisclosed amount of cash.

The Charge's first match of Stage 4 was also against the Fusion on 25 July. After splitting the first four maps, the match went to a fifth tiebreaker map; Charge won the final map to claim a 3–2 match victory. Two days later, the team swept the Boston Uprising 4–0. In their first match of week two, Guangzhou faced the London Spitfire on 1 August. The Charge lost the first three maps, Lijiang Tower, Hanamura, Blizzard World but were able to win on the final map, Havana, resulting in a 1–3 loss. The team bounced back a day later, when they handily defeated the Hangzhou Spark 3–0. The team's next match was against the Seoul Dynasty on 8 August. After falling 0–2 going into halftime, the Charge responded by winning three straight maps to take a 3–2 win over the Dynasty. Three days later, the team faced the new York Excelsior. In the first map, Lijiang Tower, New York managed to take a point, but ultimately lost the map; that point was the only point the Charge would yield in the entire match, as Guangzhou won 4–0 in one of the most lopsided matches in the history of the Overwatch League. For their final regular season match, the Charge took on the Dallas Fuel on 18 August. Guangzhou closed out the regular season on a high note, sweeping the Fuel 4–0 in a match where an in-game bug cause an hour-long delay in the final map of the series – the longest delay in Overwatch League history.

== Postseason ==
With a 15–13 regular season record, the Charge finished in 9th place in the regular season standings, qualifying them for the Play-In Tournament. The team took on the twelfth-seeded Chengdu Hunters in the first round on 30 August. After winning the first two maps, Ilios and Eichenwalde, the Hunters closed the gap by taking map three, Horizon Lunar Colony. However, the Charge would not yield another map, taking the next two and winning the match 4–1.

Advancing to the next round, the Charge faced the eighth-seeded Seoul Dynasty the following day; the winner of the match would advance to the season playoffs. Guangzhou found themselves down 0–2 going into the match break, but started to find their footing as they were able to draw the third map, Horizon Lunar Colony. The found a win next map, Rialto, due in part to a strong performance from DPS Charlie "Nero" Zwarg. However, Seoul DPS duo Kim "Fleta" Byung-sun and Kim "Fits" Dong-eon took over the match in the following two maps, and the Charge lost the series 1–4.

== Final roster ==
2019 Guangzhou Charge roster
Players
Coaches

Role	No.	Handle	Name	Nationality
Damage	0	Eileen	Ou Yiliang	China
Damage	20	Happy	Lee Jeong-woo	South Korea
Damage	42	nero	Zwarg, Charlie	United States
Tank	7	HOTBA	Choi Hong-Jun	South Korea
Tank	14	Rio	Oh Seung-pyo	South Korea
Tank	54	Fragi	Laine, Joona	Finland
Tank	31	Bischu	Kim Hyung-seok	South Korea
Support	1	shu	Kim Jin-seo	South Korea
Support	3	Chara (C)	Kim Jung-yeon	South Korea
Support	17	OnlyWish	Chen Lizhen	China
Support	18	Rise	Lee Won-jae	South Korea

Head coach

- Cho Hyo-Jin

Legend:
- (I) Inactive
- (S) Suspended
- (2W) Two-way player
- Substitute
- (injured) Injury / Illness

Latest roster transaction: 17 July 2019.

=== Transactions ===
Transactions of/for players on the roster during the 2019 regular season:

- On 17 July, Charge acquired Kim "Bischu" Hyung-seok from Los Angeles Gladiators.
- On 17 July, Charge traded Finley "Kyb" Adisi to Philadelphia Fusion in exchange for Joona "Fragi" Laine.

== Standings ==
=== Record by stage ===
Stage	Pld	W	L	Pct	MW	ML	MT	MD	Pos
1	7	3	4	.429	15	16	0	-1	11
2	7	2	5	.286	8	22	0	-14	17
3	7	4	3	.571	16	12	0	+4	10
4 (Note: No stage playoffs were held for Stage 4.)	7	6	1	.857	22	7	1	+15	3
Overall	28	15	13	.536	61	57	1	+4	9
Qualified for playoffs • Qualified for play-in tournament

=== League ===
Pos	Div	Team	Pld	W	L	PCT	MW	ML	MT	MD	Qualification
1	PAC	Vancouver Titans	28	25	3	0.893	89	28	0	+61	Advance to season playoffs (division leaders)
2	ATL	New York Excelsior	28	22	6	0.786	78	38	3	+40	Advance to season playoffs (division leaders)
3	PAC	San Francisco Shock	28	23	5	0.821	92	26	0	+66	Advance to season playoffs
4	PAC	Hangzhou Spark	28	18	10	0.643	64	52	4	+12	Advance to season playoffs
5	PAC	Los Angeles Gladiators	28	17	11	0.607	67	48	3	+19	Advance to season playoffs
6	ATL	Atlanta Reign	28	16	12	0.571	69	50	1	+19	Advance to season playoffs
7	ATL	London Spitfire	28	16	12	0.571	58	52	6	+6	Advance to play-ins
8	PAC	Seoul Dynasty	28	15	13	0.536	64	50	3	+14	Advance to play-ins
9	PAC	Guangzhou Charge	28	15	13	0.536	61	57	1	+4	Advance to play-ins
10	ATL	Philadelphia Fusion	28	15	13	0.536	57	60	3	−3	Advance to play-ins
11	PAC	Shanghai Dragons	28	13	15	0.464	51	61	3	−10	Advance to play-ins
12	PAC	Chengdu Hunters	28	13	15	0.464	55	66	1	−11	Advance to play-ins
13	PAC	Los Angeles Valiant	28	12	16	0.429	56	61	4	−5	
14	ATL	Paris Eternal	28	11	17	0.393	46	67	3	−21	
15	PAC	Dallas Fuel	28	10	18	0.357	43	70	3	−27	
16	ATL	Houston Outlaws	28	9	19	0.321	47	69	3	−22	
17	ATL	Toronto Defiant	28	8	20	0.286	39	72	4	−33	
18	ATL	Washington Justice	28	8	20	0.286	39	72	6	−33	
19	ATL	Boston Uprising	28	8	20	0.286	41	78	2	−37	
20	ATL	Florida Mayhem	28	6	22	0.214	36	75	5	−39	

Source: The Overwatch League
Rules for classification: 1) winning percentage; 2) map differential; 3) head-to-head record; 4) head-to-head map differential

== Game log ==
=== Regular season ===
2019 game log (Regular season record: 15–13)
Stage 1 (3–4)

1	15 February	Chengdu Hunters	3	–	2	Guangzhou Charge	Burbank, CA
		Recap					Blizzard Arena
		0	Busan			2	
		3	Numbani			2	
		2	Volskaya Industries			3	
		2	Dorado			1	
		2	Nepal			1	

2	21 February	Guangzhou Charge	4	–	0	Dallas Fuel	Burbank, CA
		Recap					Blizzard Arena
		2	Busan			0	
		2	Hollywood			1	
		2	Temple of Anubis			0	
		3	Route 66			2	

3	23 February	Vancouver Titans	3	–	2	Guangzhou Charge	Burbank, CA
		Recap					Blizzard Arena
		0	Nepal			2	
		1	Hollywood			0	
		3	Volskaya Industries			2	
		3	Route 66			4	
		2	Ilios			1	

4	28 February	Florida Mayhem	2	–	3	Guangzhou Charge	Burbank, CA
		Recap					Blizzard Arena
		0	Busan			2	
		2	Numbani			1	
		0	Horizon Lunar Colony			1	
		2	Rialto			1	
		0	Ilios			2	

5	3 March	Los Angeles Valiant	1	–	3	Guangzhou Charge	Burbank, CA
		Recap					Blizzard Arena
		0	Ilios			2	
		4	King's Row			5	
		1	Horizon Lunar Colony			2	
		3	Rialto			2	

6	9 March	Guangzhou Charge	1	–	3	Los Angeles Gladiators	Burbank, CA
		Recap					Blizzard Arena
		2	Nepal			0	
		3	King's Row			4	
		0	Temple of Anubis			2	
		1	Rialto			2	

7	17 March	Guangzhou Charge	0	–	4	Vancouver Titans	Burbank, CA
		Recap					Blizzard Arena
		1	Ilios			2	
		1	Numbani			3	
		1	Volskaya Industries			2	
		1	Dorado			3	

Stage 2 (2–5)

8	4 April	Guangzhou Charge	0	–	4	Paris Eternal	Burbank, CA
	9:05 pm PST	Recap					Blizzard Arena
		0	Oasis			2	
		0	Paris			2	
		2	Eichenwalde			3	
		2	Junkertown			3	

9	7 April	San Francisco Shock	4	–	0	Guangzhou Charge	Burbank, CA
	12:00 noon PST	Recap					Blizzard Arena
		2	Busan			0	
		4	Temple of Anubis			3	
		3	Eichenwalde			2	
		3	Junkertown			0	

10	12 April	Guangzhou Charge	0	–	4	San Francisco Shock	Burbank, CA
	7:00 pm PST	Recap					Blizzard Arena
		0	Oasis			2	
		2	Paris			3	
		0	Blizzard World			3	
		0	Watchpoint: Gibraltar			3	

11	13 April	Los Angeles Gladiators	4	–	0	Guangzhou Charge	Burbank, CA
	4:30 pm PST	Recap					Blizzard Arena
		2	Lijiang Tower			1	
		3	Temple of Anubis			2	
		3	Blizzard World			2	
		3	Watchpoint: Gibraltar			1	

12	19 April	Hangzhou Spark	3	–	2	Guangzhou Charge	Burbank, CA
	8:30 pm PST	Recap					Blizzard Arena
		0	Busan			2	
		2	Paris			0	
		1	King's Row			2	
		2	Watchpoint: Gibraltar			1	
		2	Oasis			0	

13	21 April	Atlanta Reign	1	–	3	Guangzhou Charge	Burbank, CA
	4:30 pm PST	Recap					Blizzard Arena
		0	Busan			2	
		7	Hanamura			6	
		7	King's Row			8	
		0	Rialto			3	

14	2 May	Guangzhou Charge	3	–	2	Houston Outlaws	Burbank, CA
	8:30 pm PST	Details					Blizzard Arena
		2	Lijiang Tower			1	
		2	Hanamura			0	
		1	King's Row			2	
		2	Rialto			3	
		2	Busan			0	

Stage 3 (4–3)

15	6 June	Guangzhou Charge	3	–	1	Chengdu Hunters	Burbank, CA
	7:30 pm PST	Details					Blizzard Arena
		2	Oasis			0	
		5	Volskaya Industries			4	
		6	Eichenwalde			5	
		2	Dorado			3	

16	8 June	Seoul Dynasty	4	–	0	Guangzhou Charge	Burbank, CA
	3:30 pm PST	Details					Blizzard Arena
		2	Oasis			0	
		2	Paris			0	
		3	Hollywood			1	
		3	Dorado			1	

17	15 June	Guangzhou Charge	1	–	3	Los Angeles Valiant	Burbank, CA
	5:15 pm PST	Details					Blizzard Arena
		0	Ilios			2	
		4	Horizon Lunar Colony			3	
		3	Numbani			4	
		1	Havana			2	

18	22 June	Toronto Defiant	0	–	4	Guangzhou Charge	Burbank, CA
	3:30 pm PST	Details					Blizzard Arena
		0	Ilios			2	
		2	Paris			4	
		0	Hollywood			3	
		0	Watchpoint: Gibraltar			3	

19	29 June	Shanghai Dragons	3	–	1	Guangzhou Charge	Burbank, CA
	5:15 pm PST	Details					Blizzard Arena
		2	Ilios			0	
		2	Paris			0	
		1	Hollywood			2	
		4	Watchpoint: Gibraltar			3	

20	6 July	Guangzhou Charge	3	–	1	Shanghai Dragons	Atlanta, GA
	1:45 pm PST	Details					Cobb Energy Center
		2	Nepal			1	
		6	Horizon Lunar Colony			5	
		3	Numbani			2	
		0	Havana			1	

21	7 July	Washington Justice	0	–	4	Guangzhou Charge	Atlanta, GA
	11:00 am PST	Details					Cobb Energy Center
		1	Nepal			2	
		0	Volskaya Industries			2	
		0	Eichenwalde			3	
		2	Watchpoint: Gibraltar			3	

Stage 4 (6–1)

22	25 July	Guangzhou Charge	3	–	2	Philadelphia Fusion	Burbank, CA
	7:10 pm PST	Details					Blizzard Arena
		0	Busan			2	
		2	Volskaya Industries			1	
		4	King's Row			3	
		3	Junkertown			4	
		2	Ilios			0	

23	27 July	Boston Uprising	0	–	4	Guangzhou Charge	Burbank, CA
	1:45 pm PST	Details					Blizzard Arena
		0	Busan			2	
		1	Temple of Anubis			2	
		1	Hollywood			2	
		4	Havana			5	

24	1 August	Guangzhou Charge	1	–	3	London Spitfire	Burbank, CA
	4:00 pm PST	Details					Blizzard Arena
		1	Lijiang Tower			2	
		3	Hanamura			4	
		1	Blizzard World			3	
		2	Havana			1	

25	2 August	Guangzhou Charge	3	–	0	Hangzhou Spark	Burbank, CA
	9:15 pm PST	Details					Blizzard Arena
		2	Lijiang Tower			1	
		2	Volskaya Industries			0	
		3	Blizzard World			3	
		3	Junkertown			2	

26	8 August	Guangzhou Charge	3	–	2	Seoul Dynasty	Burbank, CA
	9:15 pm PST	Details					Blizzard Arena
		1	Ilios			2	
		0	Hanamura			2	
		4	King's Row			3	
		3	Route 66			2	
		2	Lijiang Tower			1	

27	11 August	Guangzhou Charge	4	–	0	New York Excelsior	Burbank, CA
	5:15 pm PST	Details					Blizzard Arena
		2	Lijiang Tower			1	
		1	Temple of Anubis			0	
		1	Blizzard World			0	
		1	Route 66			0	

28	18 August	Dallas Fuel	0	–	4	Guangzhou Charge	Burbank, CA
	5:15 pm PST	Details					Blizzard Arena
		1	Ilios			2	
		0	Hanamura			2	
		1	Hollywood			3	
		3	Havana			4	

=== Playoffs ===
2019 playoff game log
Play-In Tournament (1–1)

Quarterfinals	30 August	Chengdu Hunters	1	–	4	Guangzhou Charge	Burbank, CA
	6:00 pm PST	Details					Blizzard Arena
		1	Ilios			2	
		1	Eichenwalde			2	
		3	Horizon Lunar Colony			2	
		2	Rialto			3	
		0	Lijiang Tower			2	

Semifinals	31 August	Guangzhou Charge	1	–	4	Seoul Dynasty	Burbank, CA
	3:00 pm PST	Details					Blizzard Arena
		1	Busan			2	
		1	King's Row			2	
		5	Horizon Lunar Colony			5	
		3	Rialto			2	
		0	Lijiang Tower			2	
		3	Eichenwalde			4	
