= 2019 Atlanta Reign season =

- Head coach: Brad Rajani
- General manager: Paul Hamilton
- Owner: Atlanta Esports Ventures
- Division: Atlantic

Results
- Record: 16–12 (.571)
- Place: Atlantic: 2nd; League: 6th
- Stage 1 Playoffs: Quarterfinals
- Stage 2 Playoffs: Did not qualify
- Stage 3 Playoffs: Did not qualify
- Season Playoffs: Lower Round 2
- Total Earnings: $325,000

The 2019 Atlanta Reign season was the first season of the Atlanta Reign's existence in the Overwatch League as one of eight expansion franchises added for the 2019 season.

The Reign's first ever regular season OWL match resulted in a 4–0 victory against Florida Mayhem on February 15. Atlanta finished Stage 1 with a 4–3 record and secured a spot in the Stage 1 playoffs, but a 1–3 loss in the quarterfinals by the Philadelphia Fusion ended their playoff run. Prior to Stage 2, multiple roster changes took place, including the retirement of Daniel "dafran" Francesca. The Reign struggled throughout Stages 2 and 3, posting a combined 5–9 record and no stage playoff appearances. The team hit their stride in Stage 4, when the league implemented a 2-2-2 role lock. A 4–0 victory over the Boston Uprising on August 25 gave the Reign a perfect 7–0 record in Stage 4, a 16–12 record for the season, and the sixth seed in the season playoffs.

Atlanta's first playoff match resulted with a 4–3 victory over the San Francisco Shock on September 6. However, the team fell 2–4 to the New York Excelsior the following match, sending them to the lower bracket. A 0–4 loss to the Hangzhou Spark in the following match ended the Reign's playoff run.

== Preceding offseason ==
On September 9, 2018, Atlanta announced the hiring of former San Francisco Shock head coach Brad "Sephy" Rajani as the team's head coach. On October 28, 2018, the Reign announced their full roster, consisting of eight players. It did not include any player that had previously competed in the Overwatch League; instead, the team signed the following players from various Overwatch Contenders scenes:

- Jun "Erster" Jeong,
- Ilya "NLaaeR" Koppalov,
- Daniel "dafran" Francesca,
- Blake "Gator" Scott,
- Hyeonjun "Pokpo" Park,
- Donghyung "Daco" Seo,
- Steven "Kodak" Rosenberger, and
- Petja "Masaa" Kantanen.

On November 7, initial roster signee Daniel "dafran" Francesa announced via Twitter that he would be leaving the Overwatch League; however, the resignation was short-lived, as just two days later, dafran decided to remain a member of the Atlanta Reign. On February 11, Reign promoted Dusttin "Dogman" Bowerman from ATL Academy.

== Regular season ==
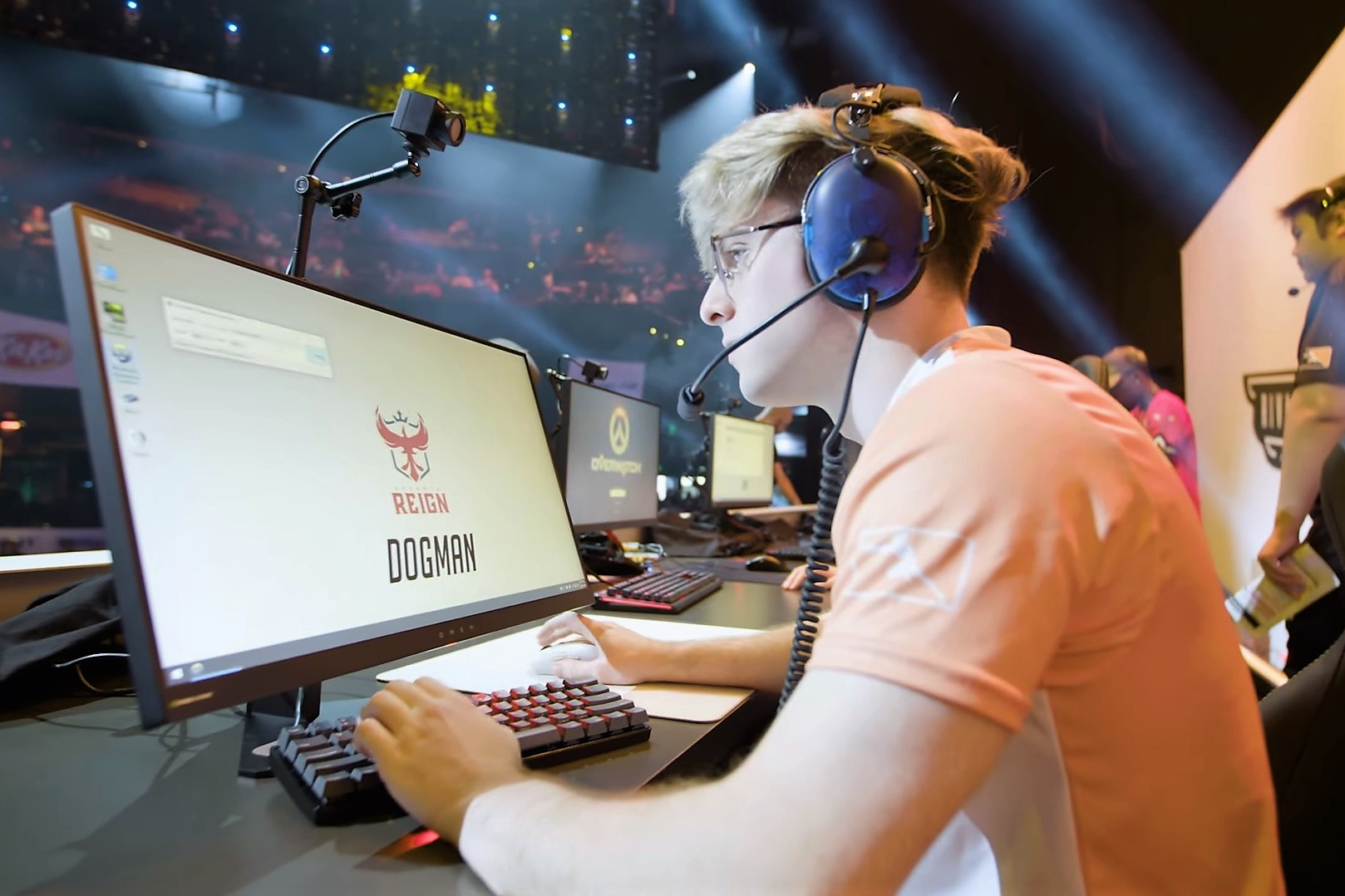
Support player Dogman at The Novo in Los Angeles

The Reign's first regular season OWL match was against the Florida Mayhem on February 15; Atlanta swept Florida 4–0. The Reign 3–1 to finished Stage 1 with a 4–3 record and claimed the fifth seed in the Stage 1 playoffs. In the quarterfinals, Atlanta lost to the Philadelphia Fusion, 1–3.

Multiple roster changes occurred prior to the beginning of Stage 2. Five days after Reign's Stage 1 playoff loss, Dafran announced that he was, again, officially retiring from the Overwatch League and became a streamer for the Reign. On March 31, the team announced that British main support player Daniel "FunnyAstro" Hathaway had been signed to the Atlanta Reign and ATL Academy on a two-way contract. Two days later, the team announced that American DPS player Andrej "babybay" Francisty had been transferred to the Reign from the San Francisco Shock. On April 3, Atlanta acquired off-tank player Nathan "frd" Goebel from the Los Angeles Gladiators academy team Gladiators Legion. Atlanta finished Stage 2 with a 3–4 record, giving the team an overall record if 7–7, and did not qualify for the Stage 2 playoffs.

In Stage 3, the Reign headed to the Cobb Energy Performing Arts Centre in Atlanta to host the "Atlanta Reign Homestand Weekend". Their first match at the homestand was against the Toronto Defiant on July 6. Dogman and Babybay put on strong offensive performances in the match, as Atlanta went on to win the match 3–1, giving the team their first win of Stage 3. The next day, Atlanta faced the Florida Mayhem. The Reign closed out Stage 3 on a high note, sweeping the Mayhem 4–0 to post a perfect record in front of their home crowd in Atlanta.

Atlanta claimed a perfect 7–0 record in Stage 4, giving the team a 16–12 record for the season. Additionally, the team's +19 map differential put them just ahead of the London Spitfire, who had the same record, in the regular season standings to give them the sixth seed in the season playoffs.

=== Homestand Weekend ===
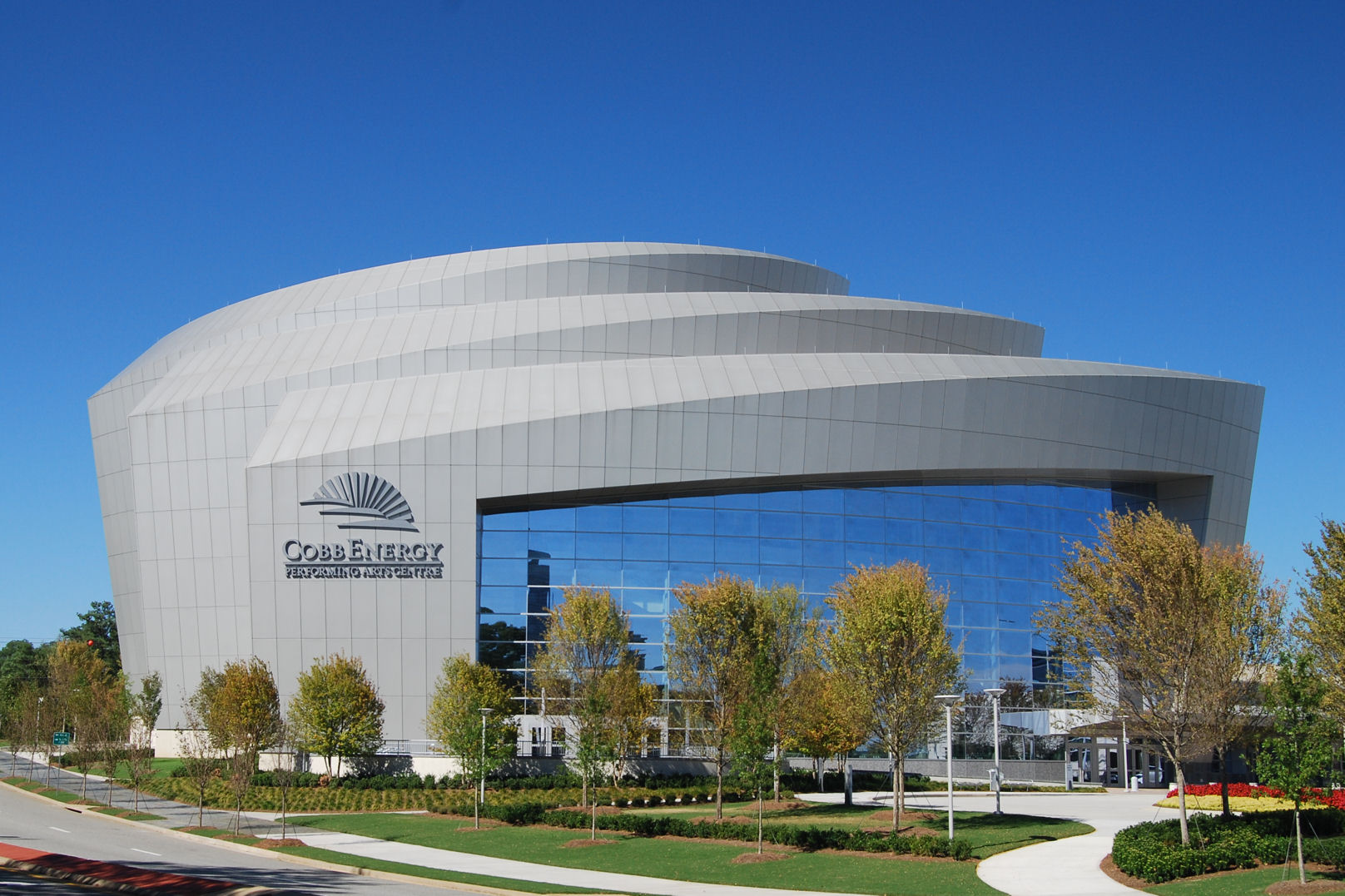
Stage 3 featured the Atlanta Reign Homestand Weekend at the Cobb Energy Performing Arts Centre.

Stage 3 saw the "Atlanta Reign Homestand Weekend" – the second of three Overwatch League "Homestand Weekends" of the 2019 season. The two-day event, which took tale place at the Cobb Energy Performing Arts Centre in Atlanta, Georgia on July 6–7, featured four matches per day among eight Overwatch League teams. The Homestand, which saw a sold-out crowd of 2,700 attendees for both days, was smaller than the Dallas Fuel Homestand, as the Allen Event Center in Dallas, Texas. Sponsors for the event included Bud Light and Atlanta-based company Coca-Cola. In reference to the League's plan to hold matches in the 2020 season locally, Activision-Blizzard Esports Leagues President & CEO Pete Vlastelica said, "It's showing us the model can work. If these were just fun events that fans were attending because they love the Overwatch game, it would be less exciting. But what we saw in Dallas (in April) and are seeing here is these are home events. At the Dallas event, when the Dallas team took the stage, the whole crowd of 4,500 people started screaming, 'Let’s go Dallas.' ... That gives us a lot of optimism going into next season to see the demand for these events to fill pretty nice sized arenas."

== Playoffs ==
Atlanta opened the double-elimination season playoffs with a match against the third-seeded San Francisco Shock on September 6. The two teams traded blows throughout the entirety of the match, with Atlanta winning maps one, three, and five, and San Francisco winning maps two, four, and six. For the final map of the series, the Reign sent the match to Rialto, while the Shock opted to attack first. On their attack, the Shock managed to reach the first two checkpoints, but the Reign held them from completing the map as the cart stopped at the choke near the end of the map. On defense, San Francisco yielded the first two checkpoints to Atlanta. With about 30 seconds remaining on their attack and the payload only a few meters away from the Shock's distance pushed, the Reign engaged the Shock at the choke; Atlanta's DPS, and former Shock player, Andrej "babybay" Francisty eliminated San Francisco's main tank Yoo "smurf" Myeong-hwan, who was the only Shock player preventing the payload from advancing. With all of the other Shock players focused on other engagements, none of them were near the payload, and the cart rolled forward far enough for Atlanta to take the map claim a 4–3 victory.

Moving on the first round of the winners' bracket, the Reign next faced the second-seeded New York Excelsior two days later. New York jumped to a quick lead, winning on Busan and King's Row in the first to matches, but Atlanta closed the gap after the match break, claiming a win on Hanamura. For map four, New York selected Rialto, and while the Reign nearly took that map to even the score, excellent defensive Bastion play by New York's Park "Saebyeolbe" Jong-ryeol ensured that the Reign would fall short. The Reign selected Lijiang Tower for map five and won it in two rounds, again closing the gap. However, the Excelsior closed out the series with a win on Numbani. The 2–4 loss sent the Reign to the lower bracket.

Atlanta's next match was against the forth-seeded Hangzhou Spark on September 12 in the second round of the lower bracket. Like their two previous matches, the Spark jumped out to an early 1–0 lead after winning on Busan. For map two, the Reign selected Numbani – a map that the Reign had performed historically well on. After both teams completed the map on their respective attacks, the map went to overtime rounds. With only one minute in the time bank, the Spark rolled on their second attack, completing the map second time; Atlanta failed to complete the same feat and took the map loss. The Spark carried their momentum into the following to maps, winning them both, as the Reign were swept, 4–0, ending their playoff run.

== Final roster ==
2019 Atlanta Reign roster
Players
Coaches

Role	No.	Handle	Name	Nationality
Damage	10	Erster	Jeong Joon	South Korea
Damage	13	babybay	Francisty, Andrej	United States
Damage	25	NLaaeR	Koppalov, Ilya	Russia
Tank	1	Gator (2W)	Scott, Blake	United States
Tank	4	frd	Goebel, Nathan	United States
Tank	6	Pokpo	Park Hyeon-jun	South Korea
Tank	7	Daco	Seo Dong-hyung	South Korea
Support	11	Dogman	Bowerman, Dusttin	United States
Support	19	FunnyAstro (2W)	Hathaway, Daniel	United Kingdom
Support	66	Masaa	Kantanen, Petja	Finland

Head coach

- Brad Rajani

Legend:
- (I) Inactive
- (S) Suspended
- (2W) Two-way player
- Substitute
- (injured) Injury / Illness

Latest roster transaction: June 10, 2019.

=== Transactions ===
Transactions of/for players on the roster during the 2019 regular season:

- On March 28, Daniel "dafran" Francesca retired.
- On March 29, Reign signed Daniel "FunnyAstro" Hathaway.
- On April 2, Reign acquired Andrej "Babybay" Francisty from San Francisco Shock.
- On April 3, Reign signed Nathan "frd" Goebel.
- On June 10, Reign moved Steven "Kodak" Rosenberger to ATL Academy.

== Standings ==
=== Record by stage ===
Stage	Pld	W	L	Pct	MW	ML	MT	MD	Pos
1	7	4	3	.571	18	12	0	+6	5
2	7	3	4	.429	14	17	0	-3	11
3	7	2	5	.286	14	17	0	-3	15
4 (Note: No stage playoffs were held for Stage 4.)	7	7	0	1.000	23	4	1	+19	1
Overall	28	16	12	.571	69	50	1	+19	6
Qualified for playoffs • Qualified for play-in tournament

=== League ===
Pos	Div	Team	Pld	W	L	PCT	MW	ML	MT	MD	Qualification
1	PAC	Vancouver Titans	28	25	3	0.893	89	28	0	+61	Advance to season playoffs (division leaders)
2	ATL	New York Excelsior	28	22	6	0.786	78	38	3	+40	Advance to season playoffs (division leaders)
3	PAC	San Francisco Shock	28	23	5	0.821	92	26	0	+66	Advance to season playoffs
4	PAC	Hangzhou Spark	28	18	10	0.643	64	52	4	+12	Advance to season playoffs
5	PAC	Los Angeles Gladiators	28	17	11	0.607	67	48	3	+19	Advance to season playoffs
6	ATL	Atlanta Reign	28	16	12	0.571	69	50	1	+19	Advance to season playoffs
7	ATL	London Spitfire	28	16	12	0.571	58	52	6	+6	Advance to play-ins
8	PAC	Seoul Dynasty	28	15	13	0.536	64	50	3	+14	Advance to play-ins
9	PAC	Guangzhou Charge	28	15	13	0.536	61	57	1	+4	Advance to play-ins
10	ATL	Philadelphia Fusion	28	15	13	0.536	57	60	3	−3	Advance to play-ins
11	PAC	Shanghai Dragons	28	13	15	0.464	51	61	3	−10	Advance to play-ins
12	PAC	Chengdu Hunters	28	13	15	0.464	55	66	1	−11	Advance to play-ins
13	PAC	Los Angeles Valiant	28	12	16	0.429	56	61	4	−5	
14	ATL	Paris Eternal	28	11	17	0.393	46	67	3	−21	
15	PAC	Dallas Fuel	28	10	18	0.357	43	70	3	−27	
16	ATL	Houston Outlaws	28	9	19	0.321	47	69	3	−22	
17	ATL	Toronto Defiant	28	8	20	0.286	39	72	4	−33	
18	ATL	Washington Justice	28	8	20	0.286	39	72	6	−33	
19	ATL	Boston Uprising	28	8	20	0.286	41	78	2	−37	
20	ATL	Florida Mayhem	28	6	22	0.214	36	75	5	−39	

Source: The Overwatch League
Rules for classification: 1) winning percentage; 2) map differential; 3) head-to-head record; 4) head-to-head map differential

== Game log ==
=== Regular season ===
2019 game log (Regular season record: 16–12)
Stage 1 (4–3)

1	February 15	Atlanta Reign	4	–	0	Florida Mayhem	Burbank, CA
		Recap					Blizzard Arena
		2	Ilios			0	
		2	Hollywood			1	
		5	Volskaya Industries			4	
		2	Route 66			1	

2	February 17	Philadelphia Fusion	3	–	2	Atlanta Reign	Burbank, CA
		Recap					Blizzard Arena
		1	Nepal			2	
		2	King's Row			1	
		4	Volskaya Industries			5	
		2	Dorado			1	
		2	Ilios			1	

3	February 22	Atlanta Reign	3	–	1	Toronto Defiant	Burbank, CA
		Recap					Blizzard Arena
		1	Busan			2	
		2	Numbani			1	
		6	Horizon Lunar Colony			4	
		3	Dorado			0	

4	March 02	Paris Eternal	0	–	4	Atlanta Reign	Burbank, CA
		Recap					Blizzard Arena
		0	Ilios			2	
		1	Hollywood			3	
		0	Temple of Anubis			2	
		2	Route 66			3	

5	March 07	Atlanta Reign	0	–	4	Los Angeles Gladiators	Burbank, CA
		Recap					Blizzard Arena
		0	Busan			2	
		3	King's Row			4	
		1	Temple of Anubis			2	
		0	Rialto			3	

6	March 16	Atlanta Reign	2	–	3	Chengdu Hunters	Burbank, CA
		Recap					Blizzard Arena
		0	Nepal			2	
		4	Numbani			3	
		0	Horizon Lunar Colony			1	
		3	Rialto			2	
		0	Busan			2	

7	March 17	Houston Outlaws	1	–	3	Atlanta Reign	Burbank, CA
		Recap					Blizzard Arena
		1	Ilios			2	
		2	King's Row			1	
		0	Horizon Lunar Colony			1	
		2	Rialto			3	

Stage 1 Playoffs

Quarterfinals	March 22	Atlanta Reign	1	–	3	Philadelphia Fusion	Burbank, CA
	6:00 pm PST	Recap					Blizzard Arena
		2	Ilios			1	
		1	King's Row			2	
		3	Volskaya Industries			4	
		1	Route 66			2	

Stage 2 (3–4)

8	April 04	Boston Uprising	3	–	2	Atlanta Reign	Burbank, CA
	5:35 pm PST	Recap					Blizzard Arena
		1	Lijang Tower			2	
		1	Temple of Anubis			2	
		3	Eichenwalde			2	
		4	Watchpoint: Gibraltar			3	
		3	Busan			2	

9	April 07	Atlanta Reign	0	–	4	London Spitfire	Burbank, CA
	1:45 pm PST	Recap					Blizzard Arena
		0	Oasis			2	
		1	Temple of Anubis			2	
		3	Blizzard World			4	
		3	Watchpoint: Gibraltar			4	

10	April 12	Los Angeles Valiant	3	–	2	Atlanta Reign	Burbank, CA
	4:00 pm PST	Recap					Blizzard Arena
		2	Lijiang Tower			0	
		2	Paris			3	
		0	Blizzard World			1	
		3	Junkertown			2	
		2	Busan			1	

11	April 14	Atlanta Reign	3	–	1	Washington Justice	Burbank, CA
	1:30 pm PST	Recap					Blizzard Arena
		2	Busan			0	
		0	Paris			1	
		2	Eichenwalde			1	
		4	Rialto			3	

12	April 19	New York Excelsior	1	–	3	Atlanta Reign	Burbank, CA
	4:00 pm PST	Recap					Blizzard Arena
		0	Busan			2	
		2	Temple of Anubis			3	
		3	King's Row			4	
		4	Rialto			3	

13	April 21	Atlanta Reign	1	–	3	Guangzhou Charge	Burbank, CA
	4:30 pm PST	Recap					Blizzard Arena
		0	Busan			2	
		7	Hanamura			6	
		7	King's Row			8	
		0	Rialto			3	

14	May 04	Atlanta Reign	3	–	2	New York Excelsior	Burbank, CA
	1:30 pm PST	Recap					Blizzard Arena
		2	Oasis			1	
		3	Hanamura			4	
		2	Blizzard World			1	
		2	Junkertown			3	
		2	Lijang Tower			0	

Stage 3 (2–5)

15	June 06	San Francisco Shock	3	–	2	Atlanta Reign	Burbank, CA
	4:00 pm PST	Details					Blizzard Arena
		1	Ilios			2	
		1	Paris			0	
		1	Hollywood			2	
		5	Watchpoint: Gibraltar			4	
		2	Oasis			0	

16	June 08	Vancouver Titans	3	–	1	Atlanta Reign	Burbank, CA
	1:45 pm PST	Details					Blizzard Arena
		2	Nepal			0	
		2	Paris			3	
		1	Hollywood			0	
		6	Watchpoint: Gibraltar			5	

17	June 14	Shanghai Dragons	3	–	2	Atlanta Reign	Burbank, CA
	5:45 pm PST	Details					Blizzard Arena
		0	Oasis			2	
		5	Volskaya Industries			4	
		4	Numbani			5	
		2	Havana			1	
		2	Nepal			0	

18	June 15	Seoul Dynasty	4	–	0	Atlanta Reign	Burbank, CA
	1:45 pm PST	Details					Blizzard Arena
		2	Oasis			1	
		5	Volskaya Industries			4	
		3	Eichenwalde			2	
		3	Dorado			2	

19	June 22	Atlanta Reign	2	–	3	Philadelphia Fusion	Burbank, CA
	1:45 pm PST	Details					Blizzard Arena
		2	Nepal			1	
		1	Horizon Lunar Colony			2	
		0	Numbani			2	
		2	Havana			1	
		0	Ilios			2	

20	July 06	Toronto Defiant	1	–	3	Atlanta Reign	Atlanta, GA
	12:00 noon PST	Details					Cobb Energy Center
		0	Oasis			2	
		1	Volskaya Industries			0	
		3	Eichenwalde			4	
		2	Dorado			3	

21	July 07	Florida Mayhem	0	–	4	Atlanta Reign	Atlanta, GA
	12:45 pm PST	Details					Cobb Energy Center
		1	Ilios			2	
		2	Horizon Lunar Colony			3	
		1	Eichenwalde			3	
		1	Dorado			2	

Stage 4 (7–0)

22	July 27	Atlanta Reign	3	–	1	Hangzhou Spark	Burbank, CA
	5:15 pm PST	Details					Blizzard Arena
		2	Ilios			0	
		2	Temple of Anubis			1	
		2	King's Row			3	
		1	Route 66			0	

23	August 03	Atlanta Reign	4	–	0	Paris Eternal	Burbank, CA
	12:00 noon PST	Details					Blizzard Arena
		2	Ilios			1	
		3	Temple of Anubis			2	
		3	Hollywood			2	
		5	Route 66			4	

24	August 04	Atlanta Reign	3	–	1	Houston Outlaws	Burbank, CA
	12:00 noon PST	Details					Blizzard Arena
		2	Lijiang Tower			0	
		2	Hanamura			3	
		1	Blizzard World			0	
		3	Route 66			2	

25	August 16	Washington Justice	1	–	2	Atlanta Reign	Burbank, CA
	4:00 pm PST	Details					Blizzard Arena
		1	Busan			2	
		1	Hanamura			1	
		1	Hollywood			0	
		2	Junkertown			3	

26	August 18	London Spitfire	0	–	4	Atlanta Reign	Burbank, CA
	12:00 noon PST	Details					Blizzard Arena
		0	Busan			2	
		0	Hanamura			2	
		0	Blizzard World			3	
		2	Havana			3	

27	August 24	Atlanta Reign	3	–	1	Dallas Fuel	Los Angeles, CA
	2:00 pm PST	Details					The Novo
		2	Busan			0	
		4	Volskaya Industries			5	
		3	King's Row			2	
		2	Havana			1	

28	August 25	Atlanta Reign	4	–	0	Boston Uprising	Los Angeles, CA
	1:45 pm PST	Details					The Novo
		2	Lijiang Tower			0	
		2	Volskaya Industries			1	
		3	King's Row			2	
		3	Junkertown			2	

=== Playoffs ===
2019 playoff game log
Season Playoffs (1–2)

First round	September 6	Atlanta Reign	4	–	3	San Francisco Shock	Burbank, CA
	7:00 pm PST	Details					Blizzard Arena
		2	Busan			1	
		0	Numbani			3	
		1	Horizon Lunar Colony			0	
		2	Watchpoint: Gibraltar			3	
		2	Lijiang Tower			0	
		5	King's Row			6	
		6	Rialto			5	

Winners Round 1	September 8	Atlanta Reign	2	–	4	New York Excelsior	Burbank, CA
	3:00 pm PST	Details					Blizzard Arena
		1	Busan			2	
		4	King's Row			5	
		2	Hanamura			1	
		1	Rialto			2	
		2	Lijiang Tower			0	
		2	Numbani			3	

Losers Round 2	September 12	Atlanta Reign	0	–	4	Hangzhou Spark	Burbank, CA
	4:00 pm PST	Details					Blizzard Arena
		0	Busan			2	
		4	Numbani			6	
		2	Temple of Anubis			3	
		3	Watchpoint: Gibraltar			4	

== Awards ==
On May 8, Dusttin "Dogman" Bowerman was named as a reserve for the 2019 Overwatch League All-Star Game.
