= Dafran =

Danish Twitch streamer

dafran
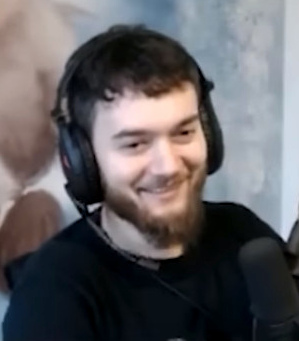
- Francesca in 2022

Personal information
- Name: Daniel Francesca
- Born: December 27, 1993 (age 32)
- Nationality: Dane

Career information
- Games: Overwatch
- Playing career: 2016–2019
- Role: Damage
- Number: 99

Team history
- 2016: Denmark
- 2017: Selfless Gaming
- 2019: Atlanta Reign

Twitch information
- Channel: dafran
- Years active: 2013–present
- Followers: 874 thousand
- Last updated: May 4, 2023

Daniel Francesca (born December 27, 1993), better known as dafran, is a Danish Twitch video game streamer and former professional Overwatch player. As an esports competitor, Francesca represented Selfless Gaming before being suspended from competitive play. He returned to competitive play with Atlanta Reign, one of the expansion franchises for the 2019 Overwatch League season. At the end of the Stage 1 of the League's 2019 season, Francesca announced that he would be stepping away from competitive play in favor of being a full-time streamer for the Atlanta Reign. Francesca has also played in the Overwatch World Cup for Team Denmark in 2016.

== Career ==
=== Selfless Gaming ===
On January 31, 2017, esports organization Selfless Gaming announced the addition of Francesca to their Overwatch roster. The team qualified for Season Zero of Overwatch Contenders 2017 on June 3; however, two days later, Francesca was suspended from casual and competitive play by Blizzard and Selfless Gaming after throwing Overwatch games on stream while streaming a pornographic dating sim game, Nekopara, atop his matches. "While Dafran will no longer be playing with our team," Selfless said in a statement, "we will be assisting him in finding the help, counseling, and guidance that he needs to improve his mental and emotional well-being." While Francesca was still on the team's roster, Selfless disbanded on July 7, 2017.

=== Atlanta Reign ===
Francesca was approved to join Atlanta's professional Overwatch League team (later revealed as Atlanta Reign) in September 2018; although he refuted the claim. A month later, Reign announced their inaugural season starting roster, which included dafran. On November 7, Francesca announced via Twitter that he would be leaving the Overwatch League, stating, "The end. I hate the game. Thought I could love it again and have passion, but it's impossible. I always end up soft throwing. Contract ended. Overwatch uninstalled. McDonald's here I come. For real though, thanks for everything you have given me OW community." However, he apologized and rejoined the team a day later, stating that he made a "dumb" mistake. The retraction marked the fourth time in nearly four months that he had changed his intentions about participating in the Overwatch League.

Throughout Stage 1 of the 2019 season, Francesca had the top-selling Overwatch League jersey, ahead of the 2018 season MVP Bang "JJonak" Sung-hyeon. Francesca helped Atlanta Reign finish Stage 1 with a 4–3 record and a Stage 1 playoff berth. Reign lost in the quarterfinals to Philadelphia Fusion on March 22; five days later, Francesca announced that he was, again, officially retiring from the Overwatch League and becoming an official Atlanta Reign streamer, citing that professional gaming was not something he enjoyed anymore.
