= 2019 New York Excelsior season =

- Atlantic Division champions
- Head coach: Yu Hyeon-sang
- General manager: Kim Yo-han
- Owner: Jeff Wilpon
- Division: Atlantic

Results
- Record: 22–6 (.786)
- Place: Atlantic: 1st; League: 2nd
- Stage 1 Playoffs: Quarterfinals
- Stage 2 Playoffs: Semifinals
- Stage 3 Playoffs: Quarterfinals
- Season Playoffs: Lower finals
- Total Earnings: $550,000

The 2019 New York Excelsior season was the second season of New York Excelsior's (NYXL) existence in the Overwatch League. The season saw NYXL looking to bounce back from a disappointing loss to the Fusion in the semifinals of the 2018 playoffs after the team finished with the best regular season record, 34–6, of the 2018 season.

New York went a perfect 7–0 in Stage 1, giving them the top seed in the Atlantic Division for the Stage 1 playoffs, but a lost 1–3 to the Seoul Dynasty eliminated them in the quarterfinals. NYXL posted a 5–2 record for Stage 2 and the fifth seed for the Stage 2 Playoffs but lost in the semifinals to the Vancouver Titans by a score of 1–4. Another perfect 7–0 record in Stage 3 gave New York the top seed in the Stage 3 playoffs, but the team fell 1–3 to the Dragons in the quarterfinals. Following a 3–1 victory over the Paris Eternal on August 2, the Excelsior clinched the second seed – and the top seed in the Atlantic Division – in the 2019 playoffs. The team finished the regular season with a 22–6 record.

NYXL opened their playoffs with a decisive 4–1 victory over the London Spitfire on September 6. For their next match, they took down the Atlanta Reign, 4–2, and advanced to the winners' finals, where they faced the Vancouver Titans. A 3–4 loss to the Titans dropped New York to the lower bracket of the tournament. The Excelsior's playoff run ended in the lower bracket finals, as they were defeated by the San Francisco Shock, 0–4.

== Preceding offseason ==
=== Player re-signings ===
From August 1 to September 9, 2018, all Overwatch League teams that competed in the 2018 season could choose to extend their team's players' contracts. In this period, Excelsior released player Song "Janus" Jun-hwa and assistant coach Kim "WizardHyeong" Hyeong-seok, both of whom went on to sign with expansion team Washington Justice.

=== Free agency ===
All non-expansion teams could not enter the free agency period until October 8, 2018; they were able to sign members from their respective academy team and make trades until then. NYXL did not make any free agency signings in the offseason but did promote two of their academy team players. Excelsior promoted Hwang "Fl0w3R" Yeon-oh and Jeong 'Nenne" Yeon-kwan from XL2 Academy on October 29 and November 8, respectively.

== Regular season ==
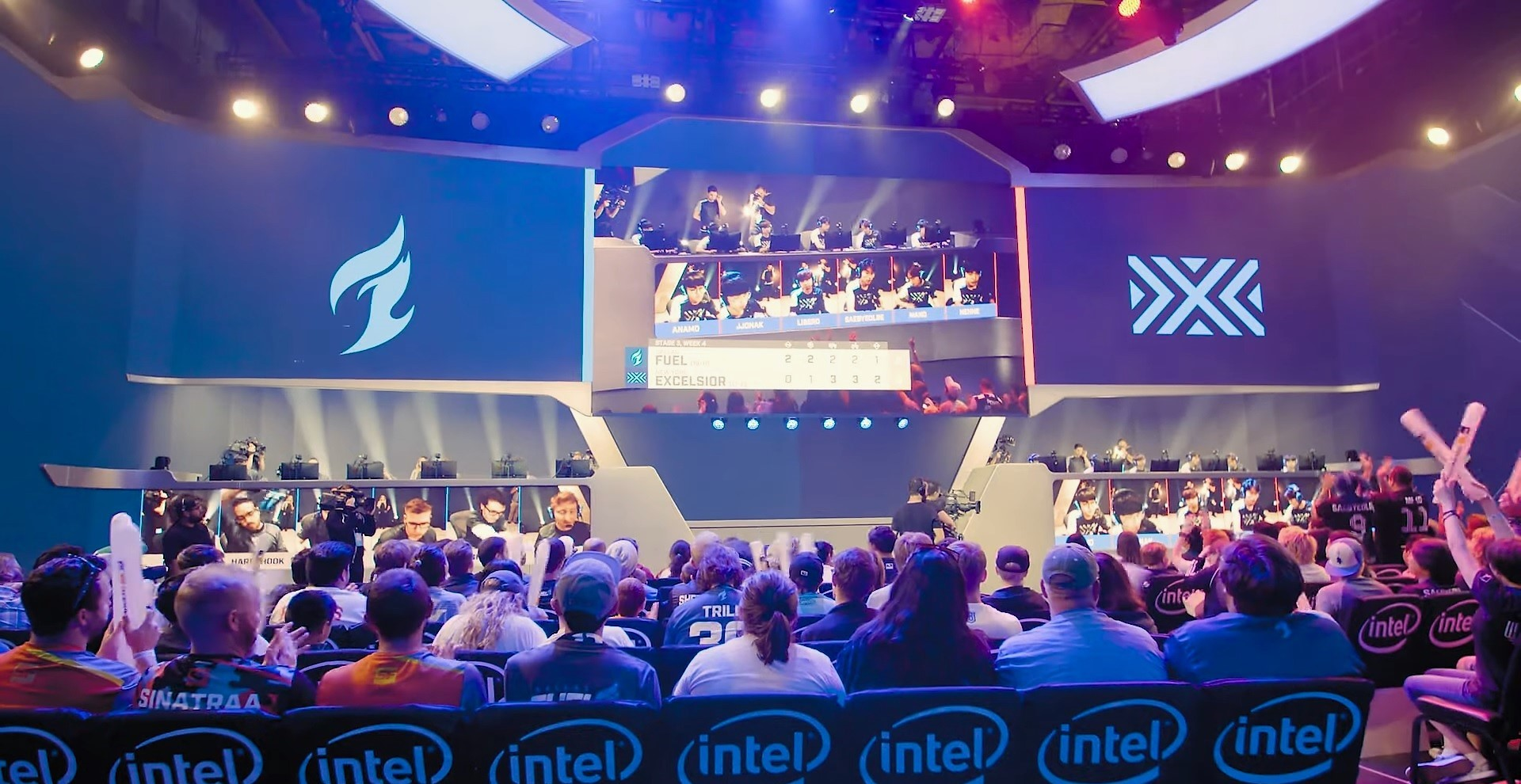
New York faced the Dallas Fuel in Stage 3.

NYXL opened their first week of the 2019 season with a match against the Boston Uprising on February 14. A win over the Seoul Dynasty on March 3 secured NYXL the first playoff spot for the Stage 1 Playoffs. After defeating the San Francisco Shock in their final match of Stage 1 on March 8, New York completed a perfect 7–0 stage. Although New York went undefeated in Stage 1, the Vancouver Titans completed the same feat but with a better map differential, so NYXL was awarded the second seed in the Stage 1 Playoffs. Prior to their quarterfinal playoff match, New York transferred Hong "ArK" Yeon-jun, who had played less than 30 minutes for NYXL in the entirety of Stage 1, to the Washington Justice. Excelsior faced the seventh-seeded Seoul Dynasty in the Stage 1 Quarterfinals on March 21; NYXL was defeated 1–3.

New York won their first five matches of Stage 2; their final two matches were both against the Atlanta Reign. Heading into their first match on April 19, NYXL was heavily favored, as predictions from ESPN had the team at a 94.4% win probability. However, they lost the match, 1–3, marking their first loss in the 2019 regular season. Their second matchup against the Reign was on May 4, and again, NYXL lost, this time with a scoreline of 2–3. With the two consecutive losses, NYXL ended the regular season of Stage 2 with a 5–2 record and the fifth seed in the Stage 2 Playoffs. New York's quarterfinal match was on May 10 against the fourth-seeded Los Angeles Gladiators. NYXL made quick work of the Gladiators, not allowing them to complete a single map, as they won in a 3–0 sweep. The win sent New York to the semifinals to face the Stage 1 champions Vancouver Titans. New York went on to lose the series, 1–4.

New York posted another perfect 7–0 stage record in Stage 3. As the top seed in the Stage 3 Playoffs, the Excelsior took on the eighth-seeded Shanghai Dragons in the Stage 3 Quarterfinals. However, they lost by a 1–3 scoreline.

The Excelsior's first match of Stage 4, along with the first match with an enforced 2-2-2 role lock by the League, was against the Los Angeles Gladiators on July 25. The Gladiators took over the match throughout, with NYXL losing 1–3. The team's final match of the regular season was against the Pacific Division Champions Vancouver Titans. The Titans came out on top, handing NYXL 2–3 loss.

== Playoffs ==
As the second seed in the season playoffs, New York began their playoff run with a match against the seventh-seeded London Spitfire on September 6. New York took the first map, Busan, to take a quick 1–0 lead in the series. For the second map, London selected Numbani. Both teams were able to complete the map on their respective attacks, but New York came out on top in overtime rounds to take a two-map lead. After a match break, the Spitfire selected Temple of Anubis for map three; again, both teams were able to complete the map on their first attacks. While London was able to take the first point on their second attack, New York's but up a solid defensive performance and prevented the Spitfire from completing the map a second time, leading to a third map win for the Excelsior. For map four, the match went to Watchpoint: Gibraltar. London took a win on the map to close the gap to 3–1. However, New York won in two rounds on Ilios to win the match in a 4–1 victory.

Moving on the first round of the winners' bracket, NYXL next faced the sixth-seeded Atlanta Reign two days later. New York jumped to a quick lead, winning on Busan and King's Row in the first to matches, but Atlanta closed the gap after the match break, claiming a win on Hanamura. For map four, New York selected Rialto, and while the Reign nearly took that map to even the score, excellent defensive Bastion play by New York's Park "Saebyeolbe" Jong-ryeol ensured that the Reign would fall short. The Reign selected Lijiang Tower for map five and won it in two rounds, again closing the gap. However, the Excelsior closed out the series with a win on Numbani. The 4–2 win advanced the team to the winners' finals.

For the winners' finals, the Excelsior took on the top-seeded Vancouver Titans on September 13. Titan's DPS Kim "Haksal" Hyo-jong ran rampant on Doomfist in the first map, Lijiang Tower, as the Titans took a convincing map one win. New York sent the match to King's Row next; the Excelsior struck back in map two, completing the map on their attack and holding Vancouver from completing the same feat, due in part to a stellar performance by New York's DPS Kim "Libero" Hye-sung on Doomfist. With the series tied 1–1 coming out of a match break, Vancouver chose Temple of Anubis for the next map. Both teams managed to complete the map on their respective attacks, New York brought out an effective Bastion on their second attack, leading to a map win for the Excelsior. Titan's DPS Seo "SeoMinSoo" Min-Soo's stellar Reaper and Doomfist play, along with well-coordinated plays from Vancouver's tank line, propelled the Titans to take maps four and five, while New York struck back to tie up the series by winning map six, Numbani. For the final map, Vancouver selected Dorado; the Titans completed the map on their attack, and with a stellar defense, they held New York from doing the same. The 3–4 loss sent New York to the lower bracket.

New York next faced the San Francisco Shock in the lower bracket finals on September 15. The match opened on Lijiang Tower with both teams opting to run an Orisa/Sigma tank composition. Both teams took a point in the map, but the Shock won on the third round to win the first map. New York sent the match to King's Row for map two; the Shock completed the map on their attack, and on their defense, they put up a stellar defensive performance, shaving off chunks New York's time bank just past the first checkpoint. The Excelsior managed to reach the second checkpoint, but a last-minute switch to McCree by Jay "sinatraa" Won shut down the Excelsior offense and prevented them from completing the map. For map three, New York chose Temple of Anubus. Both teams completed the map twice, sending the match to a second overtime round. While they took the first point, New York could not finish the map on their third attempt, while San Francisco managed to capture enough progress on the second point to take their third map win. For what would be the final map, New York elected to send the match to Rialto. The Shock attacked first and completed the map with 3:21 reaming in their time bank. On defense, the Shock could not stop New York from reaching the first two checkpoints, but they held off the Excelsior from completing the map, handing NYXL 0–4 loss and ending their playoff run.

== Final roster ==
2019 New York Excelsior roster
Players
Coaches

Role	No.	Handle	Name	Nationality
Damage	8	Fl0w3r	Hwang Yeon-oh	South Korea
Damage	9	Saebyeolbe (C)	Park Jong-ryeol	South Korea
Damage	10	Libero	Kim Hae-seong	South Korea
Damage	21	Pine	Kim Do-hyeon	South Korea
Damage	31	Nenne	Jeong Yeon-kwan	South Korea
Tank	7	Mano	Kim Dong-gyu	South Korea
Tank	11	MekO	Kim Tae-hong	South Korea
Support	44	JJoNak	Bang Seong-hyun	South Korea
Support	97	Anamo	Jung Tae-sung	South Korea

Head coach

- Yu Hyeon-sang

Legend:
- (I) Inactive
- (S) Suspended
- (2W) Two-way player
- Substitute
- (injured) Injury / Illness

Latest roster transaction: March 18, 2019.

=== Transactions ===
Transactions of/for players on the roster during the 2019 regular season:

- On March 18, Excelsior transferred Hong "ArK" Yeon-jun to Washington Justice.

== Standings ==
=== Record by stage ===
Stage	Pld	W	L	Pct	MW	ML	MT	MD	Pos
1	7	7	0	1.000	22	6	1	+16	2
2	7	5	2	.714	21	7	1	+14	5
3	7	7	0	1.000	23	7	1	+16	1
4 (Note: No stage playoffs were held for Stage 4.)	7	3	4	.429	12	18	0	-6	15
Overall	28	22	6	.786	78	38	3	+40	2
Qualified for playoffs • Qualified for play-in tournament

=== League ===
Pos	Div	Team	Pld	W	L	PCT	MW	ML	MT	MD	Qualification
1	PAC	Vancouver Titans	28	25	3	0.893	89	28	0	+61	Advance to season playoffs (division leaders)
2	ATL	New York Excelsior	28	22	6	0.786	78	38	3	+40	Advance to season playoffs (division leaders)
3	PAC	San Francisco Shock	28	23	5	0.821	92	26	0	+66	Advance to season playoffs
4	PAC	Hangzhou Spark	28	18	10	0.643	64	52	4	+12	Advance to season playoffs
5	PAC	Los Angeles Gladiators	28	17	11	0.607	67	48	3	+19	Advance to season playoffs
6	ATL	Atlanta Reign	28	16	12	0.571	69	50	1	+19	Advance to season playoffs
7	ATL	London Spitfire	28	16	12	0.571	58	52	6	+6	Advance to play-ins
8	PAC	Seoul Dynasty	28	15	13	0.536	64	50	3	+14	Advance to play-ins
9	PAC	Guangzhou Charge	28	15	13	0.536	61	57	1	+4	Advance to play-ins
10	ATL	Philadelphia Fusion	28	15	13	0.536	57	60	3	−3	Advance to play-ins
11	PAC	Shanghai Dragons	28	13	15	0.464	51	61	3	−10	Advance to play-ins
12	PAC	Chengdu Hunters	28	13	15	0.464	55	66	1	−11	Advance to play-ins
13	PAC	Los Angeles Valiant	28	12	16	0.429	56	61	4	−5	
14	ATL	Paris Eternal	28	11	17	0.393	46	67	3	−21	
15	PAC	Dallas Fuel	28	10	18	0.357	43	70	3	−27	
16	ATL	Houston Outlaws	28	9	19	0.321	47	69	3	−22	
17	ATL	Toronto Defiant	28	8	20	0.286	39	72	4	−33	
18	ATL	Washington Justice	28	8	20	0.286	39	72	6	−33	
19	ATL	Boston Uprising	28	8	20	0.286	41	78	2	−37	
20	ATL	Florida Mayhem	28	6	22	0.214	36	75	5	−39	

Source: The Overwatch League
Rules for classification: 1) winning percentage; 2) map differential; 3) head-to-head record; 4) head-to-head map differential

== Game log ==
=== Regular season ===
2019 game log (Regular season record: 22–6)
Stage 1 (7–0)

1	February 14	New York Excelsior	2	–	1	Boston Uprising	Burbank, CA
		Recap					Blizzard Arena
		2	Nepal			0	
		3	Numbani			4	
		4	Horizon Lunar Colony			4	
		3	Route 66			2	

2	February 16	Washington Justice	1	–	3	New York Excelsior	Burbank, CA
		Recap					Blizzard Arena
		0	Ilios			2	
		0	King's Row			1	
		1	Horizon Lunar Colony			0	
		1	Rialto			2	

3	February 22	New York Excelsior	3	–	2	Los Angeles Valiant	Burbank, CA
		Recap					Blizzard Arena
		0	Nepal			2	
		2	Hollywood			1	
		0	Volskaya Industries			2	
		2	Rialto			1	
		2	Ilios			0	

4	February 24	New York Excelsior	4	–	0	Houston Outlaws	Burbank, CA
		Recap					Blizzard Arena
		2	Nepal			0	
		3	Hollywood			0	
		2	Temple of Anubis			0	
		2	Route 66			1	

5	March 01	Toronto Defiant	1	–	3	New York Excelsior	Burbank, CA
		Recap					Blizzard Arena
		1	Busan			2	
		2	King's Row			3	
		1	Temple of Anubis			2	
		3	Dorado			0	

6	March 03	New York Excelsior	3	–	1	Seoul Dynasty	Burbank, CA
		Recap					Blizzard Arena
		2	Ilios			0	
		0	Numbani			1	
		1	Volskaya Industries			0	
		3	Dorado			0	

7	March 08	New York Excelsior	4	–	0	San Francisco Shock	Burbank, CA
		Recap					Blizzard Arena
		2	Busan			1	
		5	Numbani			4	
		6	Volskaya Industries			5	
		2	Dorado			1	

Stage 2 (5–2)

8	April 04	Philadelphia Fusion	0	–	4	New York Excelsior	Burbank, CA
	4:00 pm PST	Recap					Blizzard Arena
		0	Lijang Tower			2	
		1	Paris			2	
		2	Eichenwalde			3	
		1	Rialto			3	

9	April 06	New York Excelsior	3	–	0	Shanghai Dragons	Burbank, CA
	3:30 pm PST	Recap					Blizzard Arena
		2	Oasis			1	
		1	Hanamura			1	
		3	Eichenwalde			2	
		1	Watchpoint: Gibraltar			0	

10	April 11	New York Excelsior	4	–	0	Washington Justice	Burbank, CA
	5:30 pm PST	Recap					Blizzard Arena
		2	Lijiang Tower			0	
		3	Hanamura			2	
		3	Eichenwalde			1	
		3	Junkertown			2	

11	April 14	New York Excelsior	4	–	0	Florida Mayhem	Burbank, CA
	3:00 pm PST	Recap					Blizzard Arena
		2	Oasis			0	
		2	Paris			1	
		3	King's Row			2	
		3	Junkertown			2	

12	April 18	New York Excelsior	3	–	1	Philadelphia Fusion	Burbank, CA
	4:00 pm PST	Recap					Blizzard Arena
		2	Busan			0	
		3	Temple of Anubis			2	
		2	Blizzard World			3	
		1	Watchpoint: Gibraltar			0	

13	April 19	New York Excelsior	1	–	3	Atlanta Reign	Burbank, CA
	4:00 pm PST	Recap					Blizzard Arena
		0	Busan			2	
		2	Temple of Anubis			3	
		3	King's Row			4	
		4	Rialto			3	

14	May 04	Atlanta Reign	3	–	2	New York Excelsior	Burbank, CA
	1:30 pm PST	Recap					Blizzard Arena
		2	Oasis			1	
		3	Hanamura			4	
		2	Blizzard World			1	
		2	Junkertown			3	
		2	Lijang Tower			0	

Stage 3 (7–0)

15	June 07	Houston Outlaws	2	–	3	New York Excelsior	Burbank, CA
	7:30 pm PST	Details					Blizzard Arena
		2	Ilios			1	
		0	Horizon Lunar Colony			1	
		4	Numbani			3	
		3	Watchpoint: Gibraltar			4	
		0	Oasis			2	

16	June 09	New York Excelsior	4	–	0	London Spitfire	Burbank, CA
	12:00 noon PST	Details					Blizzard Arena
		2	Ilios			0	
		1	Horizon Lunar Colony			0	
		4	Hollywood			3	
		3	Havana			0	

17	June 14	Paris Eternal	1	–	3	New York Excelsior	Burbank, CA
	4:00 pm PST	Details					Blizzard Arena
		1	Nepal			2	
		0	Volskaya Industries			2	
		1	Numbani			3	
		2	Dorado			1	

18	June 21	London Spitfire	2	–	3	New York Excelsior	Burbank, CA
	4:00 pm PST	Details					Blizzard Arena
		1	Nepal			2	
		4	Paris			3	
		2	Eichenwalde			3	
		5	Dorado			4	
		0	Ilios			2	

19	June 29	Dallas Fuel	2	–	3	New York Excelsior	Burbank, CA
	12:00 noon PST	Details					Blizzard Arena
		2	Oasis			0	
		2	Paris			1	
		2	Hollywood			3	
		2	Watchpoint: Gibraltar			3	
		1	Nepal			2	

20	July 06	Florida Mayhem	0	–	3	New York Excelsior	Atlanta, GA
	8:30 am PST	Details					Cobb Energy Center
		1	Oasis			2	
		2	Volskaya Industries			2	
		2	Eichenwalde			3	
		0	Havana			1	

21	July 07	New York Excelsior	4	–	0	Toronto Defiant	Atlanta, GA
	2:30 pm PST	Details					Cobb Energy Center
		2	Nepal			0	
		2	Horizon Lunar Colony			1	
		3	Numbani			2	
		1	Havana			0	

Stage 4 (3–4)

22	July 25	Los Angeles Gladiators	3	–	1	New York Excelsior	Burbank, CA
	5:30 pm PST	Details					Blizzard Arena
		2	Busan			0	
		5	Temple of Anubis			4	
		0	Hollywood			1	
		3	Route 66			2	

23	August 02	New York Excelsior	3	–	1	Paris Eternal	Burbank, CA
	4:00 pm PST	Details					Blizzard Arena
		2	Busan			1	
		2	Volskaya Industries			0	
		3	King's Row			1	
		0	Havana			1	

24	August 04	Chengdu Hunters	4	–	0	New York Excelsior	Burbank, CA
	5:15 pm PST	Details					Blizzard Arena
		2	Lijiang Tower			0	
		2	Temple of Anubis			1	
		4	King's Row			3	
		2	Route 66			1	

25	August 09	Hangzhou Spark	2	–	3	New York Excelsior	Burbank, CA
	9:15 pm PST	Details					Blizzard Arena
		0	Ilios			2	
		3	Volskaya Industries			2	
		3	Hollywood			2	
		3	Junkertown			4	
		0	Lijiang Tower			2	

26	August 11	Guangzhou Charge	4	–	0	New York Excelsior	Burbank, CA
	5:15 pm PST	Details					Blizzard Arena
		2	Lijiang Tower			1	
		1	Temple of Anubis			0	
		1	Blizzard World			0	
		1	Route 66			0	

27	August 24	Boston Uprising	1	–	3	New York Excelsior	Los Angeles, CA
	3:45 pm PST	Details					The Novo
		1	Ilios			2	
		0	Hanamura			1	
		3	King's Row			2	
		2	Junkertown			3	

28	August 25	New York Excelsior	2	–	3	Vancouver Titans	Los Angeles, CA
	3:30 pm PST	Details					The Novo
		0	Ilios			2	
		2	Hanamura			1	
		2	Blizzard World			3	
		3	Havana			2	
		1	Lijiang Tower			2	

=== Playoffs ===
2019 playoff game log
Stage 1 Playoffs (0–1)

Quarterfinals	March 21	Seoul Dynasty	3	–	1	New York Excelsior	Burbank, CA
	6:00 pm PST	Recap					Blizzard Arena
		2	Ilios			0	
		2	Hollywood			1	
		5	Volskaya Industries			6	
		3	Rialto			2	

Stage 2 Playoffs (1–1)

Quarterfinals	May 10	New York Excelsior	3	–	0	Los Angeles Gladiators	Burbank, CA
	6:00 pm PST	Details					Blizzard Arena
		2	Lijang Tower			0	
		3	King's Row			2	
		2	Temple of Anubis			1	

Semifinals	May 11	New York Excelsior	1	–	4	Vancouver Titans	Burbank, CA
	3:00 pm PST	Details					Blizzard Arena
		1	Busan			2	
		3	Blizzard World			1	
		2	Hanamura			3	
		2	Rialto			3	
		1	Lijang Tower			2	

Stage 3 Playoffs (0–1)

Quarterfinals	July 11	Shanghai Dragons	3	–	1	New York Excelsior	Burbank, CA
	8:00 pm PST	Details					Blizzard Arena
		2	Oasis			0	
		1	Hollywood			2	
		4	Volskaya Industries			3	
		3	Watchpoint: Gibraltar			1	

Season Playoffs (2–2)

First round	September 6	London Spitfire	1	–	4	New York Excelsior	Burbank, CA
	4:00 pm PST	Details					Blizzard Arena
		0	Busan			2	
		3	Numbani			4	
		3	Temple of Anubis			4	
		2	Watchpoint: Gibraltar			1	
		0	Ilios			2	

Winners Round 1	September 8	Atlanta Reign	2	–	4	New York Excelsior	Burbank, CA
	3:00 pm PST	Details					Blizzard Arena
		1	Busan			2	
		4	King's Row			5	
		2	Hanamura			1	
		1	Rialto			2	
		2	Lijiang Tower			0	
		2	Numbani			3	

Winners Round 2	September 13	New York Excelsior	3	–	4	Vancouver Titans	Burbank, CA
	7:00 pm PST	Details					Blizzard Arena
		0	Lijiang Tower			2	
		3	King's Row			2	
		3	Temple of Anubis			2	
		2	Watchpoint: Gibraltar			3	
		0	Busan			2	
		6	Numbani			3	
		1	Dorado			3	

Losers Round 4	September 15	San Francisco Shock	4	–	0	New York Excelsior	Burbank, CA
	12:00 noon PST	Details					Blizzard Arena
		2	Lijiang Tower			1	
		3	King's Row			2	
		6	Temple of Anubis			5	
		3	Rialto			2	

== Awards ==
On May 1, Bang "JJonak" Seong-hyun was named as a starter for the 2019 Overwatch League All-Star Game. A week later Kim "Pine" Do-hyeon, Jung "Anamo" Tae-Sung, Kim "Mano" Dong-Gyu, Kim "Meko" Tae-Hong, and Jeong "Nenne" Yeon-Gwan were named as reserves for the All-Star Game.
