= 2019 London Spitfire season =

- Head coach: Kim Kwang-bok (rel. 24 July)
- General manager: Lee Seung-hwan
- Owner: Jack Etienne
- Division: Atlantic

Results
- Record: 16–12 (.571)
- Place: Atlantic: 3rd; League: 7th
- Stage 1 Playoffs: Did not qualify
- Stage 2 Playoffs: Quarterfinals
- Stage 3 Playoffs: Did not qualify
- Season Playoffs: Lower Round 1
- Total Earnings: $225,000

The 2019 London Spitfire season was the second season of the London Spitfire's existence in the Overwatch League. The Spitfire entered the season as the defending Overwatch League champions after winning the 2018 Grand Finals.

Following a 0–3 loss to the Seoul Dynasty in Week 5 of Stage 1, the Spitfire fell to 3–4 and missed out on the Stage 1 Playoffs. London found success in Stage 2, as the team posted a 6–1 record and qualified for the Stage 2 Playoffs; however, they were knocked out in the quarterfinals by the Hangzhou Spark after losing 1–3. The Spitfire parted ways with head coach Kwang-bok "Coach815" Kim in the middle of Stage 3, leaving the team without a head coach. A 0–4 loss to the Los Angeles Valiant in Stage 3 eliminated London from Stage 3 playoff contention as the team went on to post a 3–4 record for that stage. After a 4–3 win–loss record in Stage 4, London finished the regular season with a 16–12 record and qualified for the Play-In Tournament for a chance to make it to the season playoffs.

London took down the Shanghai Dragons 4–3 in an OWL record eight-map series to qualify for the season playoffs. In the first round, London was defeated by the New York Excelsior, 1–4, sending the team to the lower bracket. A 0–4 loss to the San Francisco Shock ended the Spitfire's playoff run.

== Preceding offseason ==
=== Player re-signings ===
From 1 August to 9 September 2018, all Overwatch League teams that competed in the 2018 season could choose to extend their team's players' contracts. London was the only team to re-sign all of their players; during this time, the team also signed their new head coach, Kim "Coach815" Kwang-bok.

=== Free agency ===
All non-expansion teams could not enter the free agency period until 8 October; they were able to sign members from their respective academy team and make trades until then. On 15 October, Spitfire transferred Wonsik "Closer" Jung to Dallas Fuel. A day later, London made their first free agency acquisition, signing former Element Mystic and DPS player Hee "Guard" Lee-dong. The next day, Spitfire signed Jeong "Krillin" Yung-hoon, a relatively unknown player who had most recently played in the Overwatch Open Division.

== Regular season ==
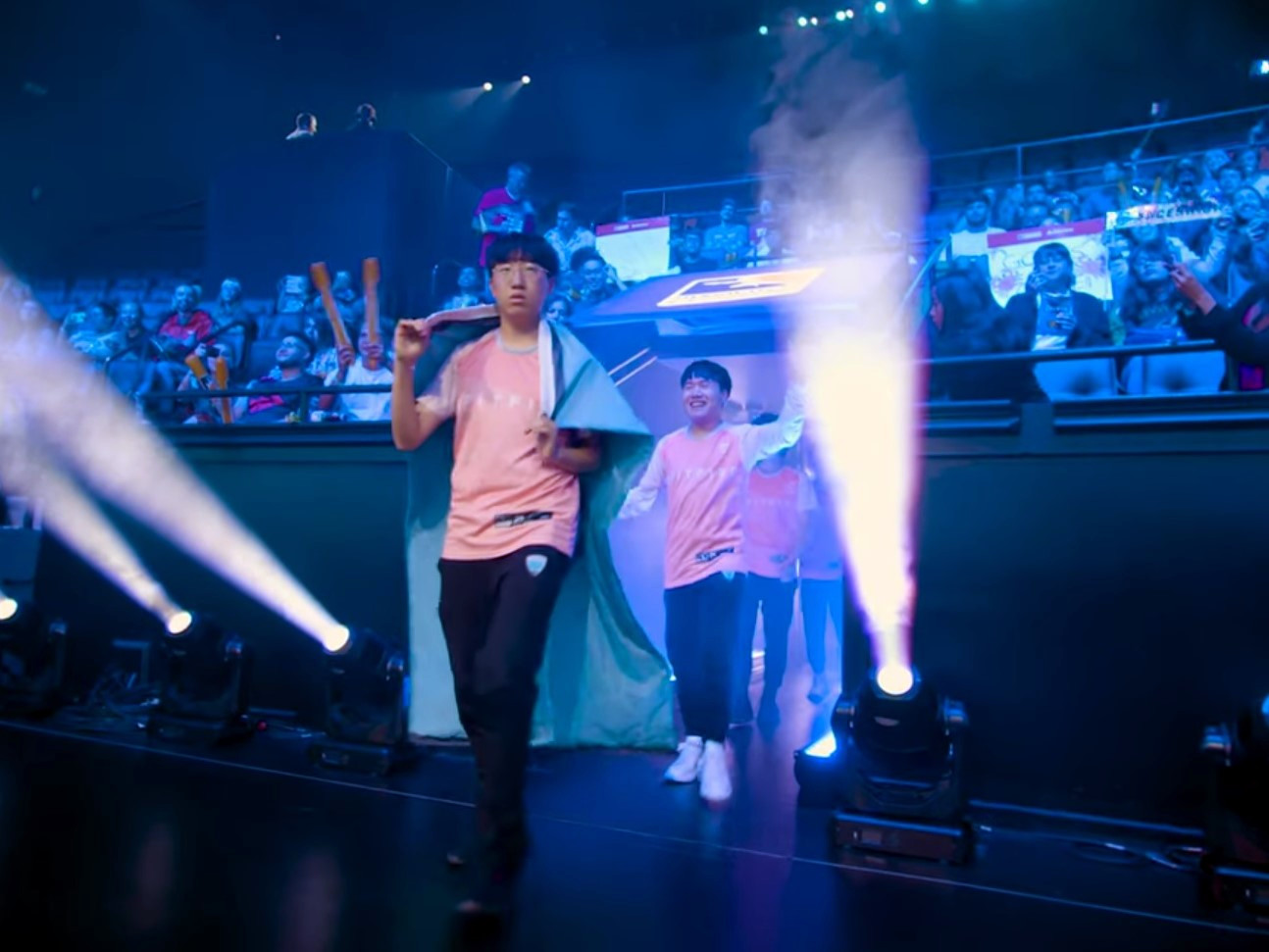
The London Spitfire walking to the stage for their first match of Stage 4.

London opened their season on 14 February against the Philadelphia Fusion – a rematch of the 2018 Overwatch League Grand Finals. The team went on to lose the match by a score of 1–3. The Spitfire finished Stage 1 with a 3–4 record, failing to advance to the Stage playoffs.

In the middle of Stage 2, London signed support player Song "Quatermain" Ji-hoon, who had previously played for Cloud9 Kongdoo. London traveled to the Allen Event Center in Allen, Texas for the Dallas Fuel Homestand Weekend in week four of Stage 2. The team first took on the Paris Eternal on 20 April; after an hour-long power outage delayed the match, London swept the Eternal 4–0, improving their undefeated stage record to 5–0. The Spitfire's second match of the weekend was against the Chengdu Hunters a day later. The Spitfire were handed their first loss of Stage 2, losing the match by a 1–3 scoreline. London finished Stage 2 with a 6–1 record, giving them the second seed Stage 2 Playoffs. London faced the seventh-seeded Hangzhou Spark in the Stage 2 Quarterfinals on 9 May; the Spitfire lost the match 1–3.

In 24 July, in the middle of Stage 3, the Spitfire parted ways with head coach Kwang-bok "Coach815" Kim, leaving the team without a head coach. The team finished Stage 3 with a 3–4 record.

The Spitfire's first match of Stage 4, along with the first match with an enforced 2-2-2 role lock by the League, was against the Dallas Fuel on 26 July; the team went on to a 3–1 win.

== Postseason ==
=== Play-In Tournament ===
Finishing in seventh place in the regular season standings, the Spitfire qualified for the Play-In Tournament for the chance to qualify for the season playoffs. The team had a first-round bye in the tournament and faced the Shanghai Dragons on 31 August. The Spitfire looked dominant in the first two maps, completely shutting down the Dragons, to jump to an early 2–0 lead. However, the Dragon's DPS duo Yang "DDing" Jin-hyeok on Pharah and Jin "YoungJIN" Yong-jin on Doomfist came alive thereafter, helping Shanghai to claim the third map, Hanamura; with a tie on map six, King's Row, the team eventually tie the series 3–3 after seven maps. London sent the match to Ilios for the final map of the series. Both teams managed to take a point in the map, but London's coordination won out in the end, as they won 4–3 loss in an Overwatch League record 8-map series to qualify for the season playoffs.

=== Playoffs ===
With the win in the Play-In Tournament, the Spitfire qualified as the seventh seed in the season playoffs. London began their playoff run with a match against the second-seeded New York Excelsior on 6 September. New York took the first map, Busan, to take a quick 1–0 lead in the series. For the second map, London selected Numbani. Both teams were able to complete the map on their respective attacks, but New York came out on top in overtime rounds to take a two-map lead. After a match break, the Spitfire selected Temple of Anubis for map three; again, both teams were able to complete the map on their first attacks. While London was able to take the first point on their second attack, New York's but up a solid defensive performance and prevented the Spitfire from completing the map a second time, leading to a third map win for the Excelsior. For map four, the match went to Watchpoint: Gibraltar. London took a win on the map to close the gap to 3–1. However, New York won in two rounds on Ilios to win the match. The 1–4 loss sent the Spitfire to the lower bracket.

For the first round of the lower bracket, London took on the third-seeded San Francisco Shock the following day. Despite London DPS Park "Profit" Joon-yeong putting on a stellar performance on Pharah throughout the match, the Shock were able to overcome everything London threw at them. Shock DPS Kwon "Striker" Nam-joo and main support Grant "Moth" Espe performed extremely well throughout the match to help the Shock rebound from their previous match, as the handed London a 0–4 sweep, ending their playoff run.

== Final roster ==
2019 London Spitfire roster
Players
Coaches

Role	No.	Handle	Name	Nationality
Damage	10	Guard	Lee Hee-dong	South Korea
Damage	13	Profit	Park Jun-yeung	South Korea
Damage	20	birdring	Kim Ji-hyeok	South Korea
Tank	7	Gesture	Hong Jae-hee	South Korea
Tank	19	Fury	Kim Jun-ho	South Korea
Support	8	NUS	Kim Jong-seok	South Korea
Support	11	Krillin	Jeong Yung-hoon	South Korea
Support	22	Bdosin	Choi Seung-tae	South Korea
Support	27	Quatermain	Song Ji-hoon	South Korea

Head coach

- Vacant

Legend:
- (I) Inactive
- (S) Suspended
- (2W) Two-way player
- Substitute
- (injured) Injury / Illness

Latest roster transaction: 26 April 2019.

=== Transactions ===
Transactions of/for players on the roster during the 2019 regular season:

- On 26 April, Spitfire signed Song "Quatermain" Ji-hoon.

== Standings ==
=== Record by stage ===
Stage	Pld	W	L	Pct	MW	ML	MT	MD	Pos
1	7	3	4	.429	12	16	2	-4	13
2	7	6	1	.857	21	5	2	+16	3
3	7	3	4	.429	11	17	1	-6	14
4 (Note: No stage playoffs were held for Stage 4.)	7	4	3	.571	14	14	1	±0	9
Overall	28	16	12	.571	58	52	6	+6	7
Qualified for playoffs • Qualified for play-in tournament

=== League ===
Pos	Div	Team	Pld	W	L	PCT	MW	ML	MT	MD	Qualification
1	PAC	Vancouver Titans	28	25	3	0.893	89	28	0	+61	Advance to season playoffs (division leaders)
2	ATL	New York Excelsior	28	22	6	0.786	78	38	3	+40	Advance to season playoffs (division leaders)
3	PAC	San Francisco Shock	28	23	5	0.821	92	26	0	+66	Advance to season playoffs
4	PAC	Hangzhou Spark	28	18	10	0.643	64	52	4	+12	Advance to season playoffs
5	PAC	Los Angeles Gladiators	28	17	11	0.607	67	48	3	+19	Advance to season playoffs
6	ATL	Atlanta Reign	28	16	12	0.571	69	50	1	+19	Advance to season playoffs
7	ATL	London Spitfire	28	16	12	0.571	58	52	6	+6	Advance to play-ins
8	PAC	Seoul Dynasty	28	15	13	0.536	64	50	3	+14	Advance to play-ins
9	PAC	Guangzhou Charge	28	15	13	0.536	61	57	1	+4	Advance to play-ins
10	ATL	Philadelphia Fusion	28	15	13	0.536	57	60	3	−3	Advance to play-ins
11	PAC	Shanghai Dragons	28	13	15	0.464	51	61	3	−10	Advance to play-ins
12	PAC	Chengdu Hunters	28	13	15	0.464	55	66	1	−11	Advance to play-ins
13	PAC	Los Angeles Valiant	28	12	16	0.429	56	61	4	−5	
14	ATL	Paris Eternal	28	11	17	0.393	46	67	3	−21	
15	PAC	Dallas Fuel	28	10	18	0.357	43	70	3	−27	
16	ATL	Houston Outlaws	28	9	19	0.321	47	69	3	−22	
17	ATL	Toronto Defiant	28	8	20	0.286	39	72	4	−33	
18	ATL	Washington Justice	28	8	20	0.286	39	72	6	−33	
19	ATL	Boston Uprising	28	8	20	0.286	41	78	2	−37	
20	ATL	Florida Mayhem	28	6	22	0.214	36	75	5	−39	

Source: The Overwatch League
Rules for classification: 1) winning percentage; 2) map differential; 3) head-to-head record; 4) head-to-head map differential

== Game log ==
=== Regular season ===
2019 game log (Regular season record: 16–12)
Stage 1 (3–4)

1	14 February	Philadelphia Fusion	3	–	1	London Spitfire	Burbank, CA
		Recap					Blizzard Arena
		2	Ilios			1	
		3	Hollywood			2	
		4	Volskaya Industries			5	
		1	Rialto			0	

2	16 February	London Spitfire	1	–	3	Paris Eternal	Burbank, CA
		Recap					Blizzard Arena
		0	Ilios			2	
		2	King's Row			1	
		2	Volskaya Industries			3	
		0	Route 66			3	

3	21 February	Washington Justice	2	–	3	London Spitfire	Burbank, CA
		Recap					Blizzard Arena
		2	Busan			1	
		3	Numbani			2	
		2	Horizon Lunar Colony			4	
		2	Rialto			3	
		0	Nepal			2	

4	24 February	Hangzhou Spark	1	–	3	London Spitfire	Burbank, CA
		Recap					Blizzard Arena
		0	Ilios			2	
		1	Numbani			2	
		0	Horizon Lunar Colony			2	
		3	Dorado			2	

5	1 March	Los Angeles Gladiators	1	–	2	London Spitfire	Burbank, CA
		Recap					Blizzard Arena
		1	Busan			2	
		3	Numbani			3	
		3	Volskaya Industries			2	
		1	Dorado			2	

6	10 March	London Spitfire	2	–	3	Shanghai Dragons	Burbank, CA
		Recap					Blizzard Arena
		2	Nepal			0	
		0	King's Row			3	
		1	Temple of Anubis			0	
		0	Route 66			3	
		1	Ilios			2	

7	16 March	London Spitfire	0	–	3	Seoul Dynasty	Burbank, CA
		Recap					Blizzard Arena
		1	Nepal			2	
		2	Hollywood			3	
		2	Temple of Anubis			2	
		2	Route 66			3	

Stage 2 (6–1)

8	5 April	London Spitfire	2	–	1	Florida Mayhem	Burbank, CA
	4:00 pm PST	Recap					Blizzard Arena
		2	Lijang Tower			0	
		2	Hanamura			3	
		3	Eichenwalde			3	
		1	Watchpoint: Gibraltar			0	

9	7 April	Atlanta Reign	0	–	4	London Spitfire	Burbank, CA
	1:45 pm PST	Recap					Blizzard Arena
		0	Oasis			2	
		1	Temple of Anubis			2	
		3	Blizzard World			4	
		3	Watchpoint: Gibraltar			4	

10	13 April	London Spitfire	2	–	1	Philadelphia Fusion	Burbank, CA
	12:00 noon PST	Recap					Blizzard Arena
		2	Lijiang Tower			1	
		2	Hanamura			2	
		3	Blizzard World			4	
		3	Rialto			2	

11	20 April	London Spitfire	4	–	0	Boston Uprising	Burbank, CA
	12:00 noon PST	Recap					Blizzard Arena
		2	Busan			0	
		3	Paris			2	
		6	King's Row			5	
		2	Junkertown			0	

12	27 April	Paris Eternal	0	–	4	London Spitfire	Allen, TX
	9:00 am PST	Recap					Allen Event Center
		0	Busan			2	
		1	Temple of Anubis			2	
		4	King's Row			5	
		1	Junkertown			3	

13	28 April	Chengdu Hunters	3	–	1	London Spitfire	Allen, TX
	11:45 am PST	Recap					Allen Event Center
		2	Oasis			1	
		4	Paris			5	
		3	Eichenwalde			0	
		2	Rialto			1	

14	4 May	London Spitfire	4	–	0	Houston Outlaws	Burbank, CA
	12:00 noon PST	Recap					Blizzard Arena
		2	Lijiang Tower			0	
		2	Hanamura			0	
		3	King's Row			2	
		2	Junkertown			0	

Stage 2 Playoffs

Quarterfinals	9 May	Hangzhou Spark	3	–	1	London Spitfire	Burbank, CA
	8:00 pm PST	Details					Blizzard Arena
		1	Oasis			2	
		3	Blizzard World			0	
		1	Hanamura			0	
		1	Watchpoint: Gibraltar			0	

Stage 3 (3–4)

15	7 June	Boston Uprising	0	–	4	London Spitfire	Burbank, CA
	5:45 pm PST	Details					Blizzard Arena
		0	Oasis			2	
		0	Horizon Lunar Colony			1	
		1	Eichenwalde			2	
		1	Dorado			2	

16	9 June	New York Excelsior	4	–	0	London Spitfire	Burbank, CA
	12:00 noon PST	Details					Blizzard Arena
		2	Ilios			0	
		1	Horizon Lunar Colony			0	
		4	Hollywood			3	
		3	Havana			0	

17	14 June	Toronto Defiant	1	–	3	London Spitfire	Burbank, CA
	5:45 pm PST	Details					Blizzard Arena
		2	Ilios			1	
		0	Volskaya Industries			1	
		3	Hollywood			4	
		2	Watchpoint: Gibraltar			3	

18	21 June	London Spitfire	2	–	3	New York Excelsior	Burbank, CA
	4:00 pm PST	Details					Blizzard Arena
		1	Nepal			2	
		4	Paris			3	
		2	Eichenwalde			3	
		5	Dorado			4	
		0	Ilios			2	

19	22 June	London Spitfire	2	–	1	Washington Justice	Burbank, CA
	12:00 noon PST	Details					Blizzard Arena
		1	Nepal			2	
		2	Paris			2	
		4	Numbani			3	
		4	Dorado			3	

20	28 June	London Spitfire	0	–	4	Los Angeles Valiant	Burbank, CA
	5:30 pm PST	Details					Blizzard Arena
		1	Nepal			2	
		3	Volskaya Industries			4	
		0	Hollywood			3	
		0	Watchpoint: Gibraltar			3	

21	30 June	London Spitfire	0	–	4	San Francisco Shock	Burbank, CA
	1:45 pm PST	Details					Blizzard Arena
		0	Oasis			2	
		5	Horizon Lunar Colony			6	
		0	Numbani			1	
		4	Havana			5	

Stage 4 (4–3)

22	26 July	Dallas Fuel	1	–	3	London Spitfire	Burbank, CA
	5:45 pm PST	Details					Blizzard Arena
		2	Ilios			1	
		1	Hanamura			2	
		2	King's Row			3	
		1	Route 66			2	

23	28 July	London Spitfire	3	–	1	Toronto Defiant	Burbank, CA
	1:45 pm PST	Details					Blizzard Arena
		0	Ilios			2	
		1	Temple of Anubis			0	
		3	Hollywood			0	
		3	Junkertown			2	

24	1 August	Guangzhou Charge	1	–	3	London Spitfire	Burbank, CA
	4:00 pm PST	Details					Blizzard Arena
		1	Lijiang Tower			2	
		3	Hanamura			4	
		1	Blizzard World			3	
		2	Havana			1	

25	3 August	Florida Mayhem	3	–	0	London Spitfire	Burbank, CA
	1:45 pm PST	Details					Blizzard Arena
		2	Lijiang Tower			0	
		1	Volskaya Industries			0	
		3	Blizzard World			3	
		3	Junkertown			2	

26	8 August	London Spitfire	2	–	3	Vancouver Titans	Burbank, CA
	4:00 pm PST	Details					Blizzard Arena
		2	Busan			0	
		1	Temple of Anubis			2	
		1	Hollywood			0	
		4	Route 66			5	
		1	Ilios			2	

27	10 August	Houston Outlaws	1	–	3	London Spitfire	Burbank, CA
	12:00 noon PST	Details					Blizzard Arena
		0	Lijiang Tower			2	
		3	Volskaya Industries			4	
		2	King's Row			3	
		1	Route 66			0	

28	18 August	London Spitfire	0	–	4	Atlanta Reign	Burbank, CA
	12:00 noon PST	Details					Blizzard Arena
		0	Busan			2	
		0	Hanamura			2	
		0	Blizzard World			3	
		2	Havana			3	

=== Playoffs ===
2019 playoff game log
Play-In Tournament (1–0)

Quarterfinals	First-round bye

Semifinals	31 August	Shanghai Dragons	3	–	4	London Spitfire	Burbank, CA
	12:00 noon PST	Details					Blizzard Arena
		0	Busan			2	
		0	Numbani			1	
		1	Hanamura			0	
		4	Watchpoint: Gibraltar			5	
		2	Lijiang Tower			1	
		3	King's Row			3	
		3	Dorado			1	
		1	Ilios			2	

Season Playoffs (0–2)

First round	6 September	London Spitfire	1	–	4	New York Excelsior	Burbank, CA
	4:00 pm PST	Details					Blizzard Arena
		0	Busan			2	
		3	Numbani			4	
		3	Temple of Anubis			4	
		2	Watchpoint: Gibraltar			1	
		0	Ilios			2	

Losers Round 1	7 September	London Spitfire	0	–	4	San Francisco Shock	Burbank, CA
	9:00 pm PST	Details					Blizzard Arena
		1	Busan			2	
		2	Numbani			3	
		1	Horizon Lunar Colony			2	
		1	Watchpoint: Gibraltar			2	

== Awards ==
On 8 May, Kim "Fury" Jun-Ho, Hong "Gesture" Jae-Hui, and Park "Profit" Jun-Young were named as a reserves for the 2019 Overwatch League All-Star Game.
