= 2019 Hangzhou Spark season =

- Head coach: Muho Lee
- General manager: Saisai Huang
- Owner: Rui Chen
- Division: Pacific

Results
- Record: 18–10 (.643)
- Place: Pacific: 3rd; League: 4th
- Stage 1 Playoffs: Did not qualify
- Stage 2 Playoffs: Semifinals
- Stage 3 Playoffs: Quarterfinals
- Season Playoffs: Lower Round 3
- Total Earnings: $425,000

The 2019 Hangzhou Spark season was the first season of Hangzhou Spark's existence in the Overwatch League as one of eight expansion franchises added for the 2019 season.

The Spark struggled in Stage 1, posting a 3–4 record and missing the Stage 1 Playoffs. A 3–1 win over the Seoul Dynasty on 5 May gave the team a 5–2 record for Stage 2 and the seventh seed in the Stage 2 Playoffs. Hangzhou defeated the London Spitfire, 3–1, in the Stage 2 quarterfinals, but their playoff run ended after getting swept 0–4 by the San Francisco Shock in the semifinals. The Spark improved upon their Stage 2 performance in Stage 3, amassing a 6–1 record and the third seed in the Stage 3 Playoffs. However, they were eliminated in the quarterfinals by the Los Angeles Valiant after losing a in five-map series. Hangzhou struggled at the beginning of Stage 4 after suspending their starting DPS Cai "Krystal" Shilong and the implementation of an enforced 2-2-2 role lock by the league. The team lost their first three matches of the stage but recovered by winning their final four matches. The Spark ended the regular season with an 18–10 record and the fourth seed in the season playoffs.

The Spark began their playoff run with a 3–4 loss to the Los Angeles Gladiators, sending them to the lower bracket. The team defeated the Seoul Dynasty, 4–1, in the first round of the lower bracket. In the second round, the Spark swept the Atlanta Reign, 4–0 to advance to the third round, where they faced the Shock. The Spark's season came to an end in a 0–4 loss to the Shock.

== Preceding offseason ==
On 16 November, the Spark revealed their new head coach, Lee "Mask" Mu-ho. In the following week, the Spark revealed their 10-man inaugural roster through a series of Twitter posts, consisting of the following players from different Chinese and Korean Contenders teams:

- Jeong "NoSmite" Da-un,
- Xu "Guxue" Qiulin,
- Kang "Adora" Jae-hwan,
- Park "Ria" Seong-wook,
- Park "Bazzi" Jun-ki,
- Kim "GodsB" Kyeong-bo,
- An "Revenge" Hyeong-geun,
- Park "iDK" Ho-jin,
- Shilong "Krystal" Cai, and
- Yoon "BeBe" Hui-chang.

== Regular season ==
=== Stage 1 ===
Spark began their 2019 season with wins over Shanghai Dragons and Los Angeles Valiant in week one. One day prior to week two, Spark signed flex tank Song "SASIN" Sang-hyun. Despite the strong start, Spark dropped four of their last five matches to end the stage with a 3–4 record.

=== Stage 2 ===
Hangzhou opened Stage 2 with a 0–4 loss to the Stage 1 champions Vancouver Titans. Spark would find their first victory of Stage 2 a week later, as the team won in map 5 against Boston Uprising. Hangzhou would again win in a five-map series – this time against Guangzhou Charge – the following week. Two days later, Spark was swept 0–4 against the Stage 1 runners-up San Francisco Shock. Spark headed to Allen, Texas in week four for the Dallas Fuel "Homestand Weekend". The team took both of their matches against Chengdu Hunters and Paris Eternal, giving them a 4–2 record heading into their final match of the stage against Seoul Dynasty. Hangzhou defeated Seoul 3–1 to clinch a Stage 2 Playoff berth.

Spark faced London Spitfire in the Stage 2 Quarterfinals. After dropping the first map, Spark did not allow Spitfire to cap a single point in the final three maps as the team went on to a 3–1 victory to move on to the Semifinals against San Francisco Shock. In the Semifinals match, Spark did not cap a single point in the first three maps. Hangzhou was able to push the fourth map against San Francisco to overtime, but Shock took the map to sweep Spark and end their playoff run.

=== Stage 3 ===
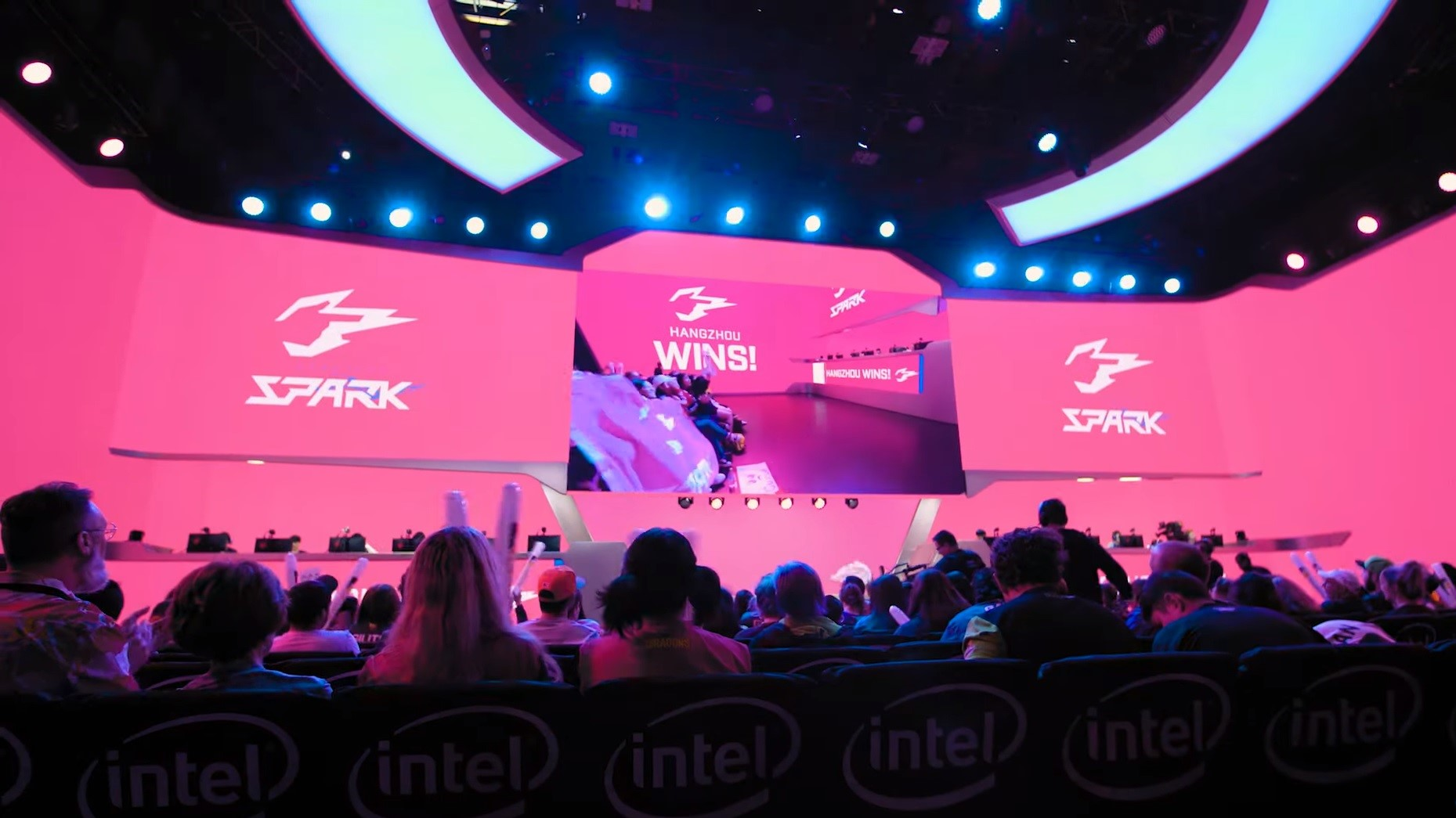
Blizzard Arena after Hangzhou defeated Dallas in Stage 3.

The Spark's first match of Stage 3 was against the Philadelphia Fusion on 8 June. Hangzhou took advantage of Philadelphia's inability to adapt their lineup won the match in a 4–0 sweep. The following week, the Spark faced the undefeated Vancouver Titans. Amidst several close maps, the Spark could only take one map from the Titans, as they fell 1–3 in the match. Two days later, the team took on the Washington Justice. After win and a tie in the first two maps, Hangzhou handed Washington one of the most dominant map losses in the history of the Overwatch League on Hollywood, as the Justice only secured two eliminations in the entire map. Hangzhou went on to win the match 3–0. The Spark's next match was against the Dallas Fuel on 20 June; the team took a convincing 3–0 win. Hangzhou faced the Seoul Dynasty two days later. After four maps, the series was tied up, forcing the match to a fifth tiebreaker map; the Spark came out of the map with a win to take the match 3–2. For their final week of the stage, the Spark first took on the Los Angeles Valiant on 27 June. The match went down to the wire, as the teams went to a fifth tiebreaker map. Like their previous match, the Spark came out with a 3–2 victory. Their final match of the stage was against the Florida Mayhem two days later. took on the Hangzhou Spark on 29 June. Amidst a dominant performance, the Spark set an Overwatch League record for the fastest completion on Eichenwalde at 4 minutes and 12 seconds; Hangzhou swept the Mayhem 4–0.

Finishing Stage 3 with an impressive 6–1 record, the Spark claimed the third seed in the Stage 3 Playoffs. For their quarterfinals match, the team took on the sixth-seeded Los Angeles Valiant on 12 July. The match opened on Ilios, while Hangzhou kept it close in both rounds, the Valiant came out with a map win. The Spark quickly turned it around, however, claiming wins on Hollywood and Paris, largely due to a strong performance from main tank Xu "guxue" Qiulin on Winston on both maps. However, the Valiant evened the match score with a win on Havana, bringing the match to a fifth tiebreaker map. The match went to Oasis; the Spark were handed their first ever map five loss and lost the series 2–3.

=== Stage 4 ===
Prior to the beginning of Stage 4, which would include the implementation of an enforced 2-2-2 role lock by the league, the Spark fined DPS Cai "Krystal" Shilong after he failed to return to the team following a ten-day leave to China. Krystal would later be indefinitely suspended by the Spark after a week-long public feud ensued.

The Spark's first match of Stage 4 was against the Atlanta Reign on 27 July; Hangzhou lost the match 1–3. The following week, the team was handily defeated by the Guangzhou Charge, 0–3. Looking to bounce back from their recent struggles, Hangzhou faced the New York Excelsior on 9 August. A back-and-forth battle sent the match to a fifth tiebreaker map, but the Spark were unable to pick up a win and lost the match 2–3. The team finally picked up their first win of the stage a day later, when they defeated the Chengdu Hunters, 3–1. That momentum carried on to the following week, as the Spark downed the Dallas Fuel by a score of 3–1. The following day, the Spark took on the Los Angeles Gladiators. Hangzhou looked to have finally adapted to the new meta and team chemistry, as they took down the Gladiators, 3–2, in a five-map series. The win secured the Spark a spot in the season playoffs. For their final match of the regular season, the Spark headed to The Novo in Los Angeles to play in the Kit Kat Rivalry Weekend, hosted by the Los Angeles Valiant, where faced the Stage 3 Champions Shanghai Dragons on 25 August. The Spark closed out the regular season on a high note, sweeping the Dragons 4–0 to finish with a four-game winning streak and the fourth seed in the season playoffs.

== Playoffs ==
The Spark took on the fifth-seeded Los Angeles Gladiators in the first round of the season playoffs on 5 September. The Spark jumped out to a 1–0 lead after taking the first map win on Busan, but the Gladiators surged back, winning on King's Row, Temple of Anubis, and Rialto. Down 1–3, the Spark mounted their own comeback, winning the following two maps, Lijiang Tower and Eichenwalde. With the series tied 3–3, the match went to Watchpoint: Gibraltar. On defense, the Spark could not prevent the Gladiators from completing the map, and on their own attack, they were held from reaching the second checkpoint, losing the match 3–4. The loss sent the Spark to the lower bracket.

Two days later, Hangzhou faced the eighth-seeded Seoul Dynasty in the first round of the lower bracket. The Spark took the first map of the match, Busan, but the Dynasty evened the series after winning on Eichenwalde. The Spark found their groove coming out of the match break, winning on Temple of Anubis, Dorado, and Lijiang Tower. The 4–1 win eliminated Seoul from the playoffs and sent Hangzhou to the second round of the lower bracket.

Hangzhou's next match was against the sixth-seeded Atlanta Reign on 12 September. Like their two previous matches, the Spark jumped out to an early 1–0 lead after winning on Busan. For map two, the Reign selected Numbani – a map that the Reign had performed historically well on. After both teams completed the map on their respective attacks, the map went to overtime rounds. With only one minute in the time bank, the Spark rolled on their second attack, completing the map second time; Hangzhou prevented Atlanta from completing the same feat and took the map win. The Spark carried their momentum into the following to maps, winning them both, and swept the Reign, 4–0.

Advancing to the third round of the lower bracket, the Spark next faced the third-seeded San Francisco Shock two days later. The match started on Busan, where the Spark started strong by winning the first round; however, the Shock surged backed on rounds two and three to put Hangzhou down 0–1 in the series. Looking to rebound, the Spark selected King's Row for map two. Both teams were able to complete the map on their respective attacks, but the Spark were unable to claim a point in overtime rounds and lost the map. Coming out of match break down 0–2, the Spark sent the match to Temple of Anubis. Again, both teams completed the map on their first attempts; in overtime rounds, each team, again, completed the map, sending the map to a second overtime round. The Spark could not take a point on their third attempt, while the Shock capped the first point to take their third map win. In the fourth map, Dorado, each team, for the third consecutive map, completed the map on their first attacks. Once again in overtime rounds, the Spark managed to reach the first checkpoint, but they were held from reaching the second. The distance captured would prove not to be enough, as the Shock pushed the payload further on their attack. The 0–4 loss eliminated the Spark from the playoffs.

== Final roster ==
2019 Hangzhou Spark roster
Players
Coaches

| Role | No. | Handle | Name | Nationality |
|---|---|---|---|---|
| Damage | 0 | Bazzi | Park Jun-ki | South Korea |
| Damage | 1 | Adora | Kang Jae-hwan | South Korea |
| Damage | 7 | Krystal (S) | Cai Shilong | China |
| Damage | 10 | GodsB | Kim Kyeong-bo | South Korea |
| Damage | 20 | SASIN | Song Sang-hyun | South Korea |
| Tank | 3 | NoSmite | Jeong Da-un | South Korea |
| Tank | 8 | guxue | Xu Qiulin | China |
| Tank | 11 | Ria | Park Seong-wook | South Korea |
| Support | 23 | BeBe | Yoon Hui-chang | South Korea |
| Support | 24 | Revenge | An Hyeong-geun | South Korea |
| Support | 37 | iDK | Park Ho-jin | South Korea |

Head coach

- Lee Mu-ho

Legend:
- (I) Inactive
- (S) Suspended
- (2W) Two-way player
- Substitute
- (injured) Injury / Illness

Latest roster transaction: 22 February 2019.

=== Transactions ===
Transactions of/for players on the roster during the 2019 regular season:

- On 22 February, Spark signed Song "SASIN" Sang-hyun.

== Standings ==
=== Record by stage ===
| Stage | Pld | W | L | Pct | MW | ML | MT | MD | Pos |
|---|---|---|---|---|---|---|---|---|---|
| 1 | 7 | 3 | 4 | .429 | 12 | 16 | 1 | -4 | 13 |
| 2 | 7 | 5 | 2 | .714 | 15 | 16 | 0 | -1 | 7 |
| 3 | 7 | 6 | 1 | .857 | 21 | 7 | 2 | +14 | 3 |
| 4 (Note: No stage playoffs were held for Stage 4.) | 7 | 4 | 3 | .571 | 16 | 13 | 1 | +3 | 7 |
| Overall | 28 | 18 | 10 | .643 | 64 | 52 | 4 | +12 | 4 |
Qualified for playoffs • Qualified for play-in tournament

=== League ===
| Pos | Div | Team | Pld | W | L | PCT | MW | ML | MT | MD | Qualification |
|---|---|---|---|---|---|---|---|---|---|---|---|
| 1 | PAC | Vancouver Titans | 28 | 25 | 3 | 0.893 | 89 | 28 | 0 | +61 | Advance to season playoffs (division leaders) |
| 2 | ATL | New York Excelsior | 28 | 22 | 6 | 0.786 | 78 | 38 | 3 | +40 | Advance to season playoffs (division leaders) |
| 3 | PAC | San Francisco Shock | 28 | 23 | 5 | 0.821 | 92 | 26 | 0 | +66 | Advance to season playoffs |
| 4 | PAC | Hangzhou Spark | 28 | 18 | 10 | 0.643 | 64 | 52 | 4 | +12 | Advance to season playoffs |
| 5 | PAC | Los Angeles Gladiators | 28 | 17 | 11 | 0.607 | 67 | 48 | 3 | +19 | Advance to season playoffs |
| 6 | ATL | Atlanta Reign | 28 | 16 | 12 | 0.571 | 69 | 50 | 1 | +19 | Advance to season playoffs |
| 7 | ATL | London Spitfire | 28 | 16 | 12 | 0.571 | 58 | 52 | 6 | +6 | Advance to play-ins |
| 8 | PAC | Seoul Dynasty | 28 | 15 | 13 | 0.536 | 64 | 50 | 3 | +14 | Advance to play-ins |
| 9 | PAC | Guangzhou Charge | 28 | 15 | 13 | 0.536 | 61 | 57 | 1 | +4 | Advance to play-ins |
| 10 | ATL | Philadelphia Fusion | 28 | 15 | 13 | 0.536 | 57 | 60 | 3 | −3 | Advance to play-ins |
| 11 | PAC | Shanghai Dragons | 28 | 13 | 15 | 0.464 | 51 | 61 | 3 | −10 | Advance to play-ins |
| 12 | PAC | Chengdu Hunters | 28 | 13 | 15 | 0.464 | 55 | 66 | 1 | −11 | Advance to play-ins |
| 13 | PAC | Los Angeles Valiant | 28 | 12 | 16 | 0.429 | 56 | 61 | 4 | −5 | |
| 14 | ATL | Paris Eternal | 28 | 11 | 17 | 0.393 | 46 | 67 | 3 | −21 | |
| 15 | PAC | Dallas Fuel | 28 | 10 | 18 | 0.357 | 43 | 70 | 3 | −27 | |
| 16 | ATL | Houston Outlaws | 28 | 9 | 19 | 0.321 | 47 | 69 | 3 | −22 | |
| 17 | ATL | Toronto Defiant | 28 | 8 | 20 | 0.286 | 39 | 72 | 4 | −33 | |
| 18 | ATL | Washington Justice | 28 | 8 | 20 | 0.286 | 39 | 72 | 6 | −33 | |
| 19 | ATL | Boston Uprising | 28 | 8 | 20 | 0.286 | 41 | 78 | 2 | −37 | |
| 20 | ATL | Florida Mayhem | 28 | 6 | 22 | 0.214 | 36 | 75 | 5 | −39 | |

Source: The Overwatch League
Rules for classification: 1) winning percentage; 2) map differential; 3) head-to-head record; 4) head-to-head map differential

== Game log ==
=== Regular season ===
2019 game log (Regular season record: 18–10)
Stage 1 (3–4)

| 1 | 14 February | Shanghai Dragons | 1 | – | 3 | Hangzhou Spark | Burbank, CA |
| | | Recap | | | | | Blizzard Arena |
| | | 1 | Busan | | | 2 | |
| | | 1 | Hollywood | | | 2 | |
| | | 3 | Horizon Lunar Colony | | | 2 | |
| | | 1 | Rialto | | | 2 | |

| 2 | 16 February | Los Angeles Valiant | 2 | – | 3 | Hangzhou Spark | Burbank, CA |
| | | Recap | | | | | Blizzard Arena |
| | | 1 | Busan | | | 2 | |
| | | 3 | Numbani | | | 1 | |
| | | 4 | Temple of Anubis | | | 3 | |
| | | 2 | Dorado | | | 3 | |
| | | 1 | Nepal | | | 2 | |

| 3 | 23 February | Houston Outlaws | 3 | – | 1 | Hangzhou Spark | Burbank, CA |
| | | Recap | | | | | Blizzard Arena |
| | | 2 | Busan | | | 0 | |
| | | 5 | King's Row | | | 4 | |
| | | 4 | Temple of Anubis | | | 3 | |
| | | 0 | Dorado | | | 1 | |

| 4 | 24 February | Hangzhou Spark | 1 | – | 3 | London Spitfire | Burbank, CA |
| | | Recap | | | | | Blizzard Arena |
| | | 0 | Ilios | | | 2 | |
| | | 1 | Numbani | | | 2 | |
| | | 0 | Horizon Lunar Colony | | | 2 | |
| | | 3 | Dorado | | | 2 | |

| 5 | 28 February | San Francisco Shock | 3 | – | 1 | Hangzhou Spark | Burbank, CA |
| | | Recap | | | | | Blizzard Arena |
| | | 1 | Ilios | | | 2 | |
| | | 1 | Hollywood | | | 0 | |
| | | 4 | Temple of Anubis | | | 2 | |
| | | 3 | Route 66 | | | 0 | |

| 6 | 3 March | Hangzhou Spark | 3 | – | 1 | Los Angeles Gladiators | Burbank, CA |
| | | Recap | | | | | Blizzard Arena |
| | | 2 | Nepal | | | 1 | |
| | | 2 | Hollywood | | | 3 | |
| | | 3 | Volskaya Industries | | | 2 | |
| | | 1 | Route 66 | | | 0 | |

| 7 | 9 March | Hangzhou Spark | 0 | – | 3 | Toronto Defiant | Burbank, CA |
| | | Recap | | | | | Blizzard Arena |
| | | 1 | Nepal | | | 2 | |
| | | 1 | King's Row | | | 3 | |
| | | 2 | Volskaya Industries | | | 2 | |
| | | 3 | Rialto | | | 4 | |

Stage 2 (5–2)

| 8 | 7 April | Vancouver Titans | 4 | – | 0 | Hangzhou Spark | Burbank, CA |
| | 3:30 pm PST | Recap | | | | | Blizzard Arena |
| | | 2 | Oasis | | | 0 | |
| | | 3 | Hanamura | | | 2 | |
| | | 4 | King's Row | | | 3 | |
| | | 3 | Watchpoint: Gibraltar | | | 2 | |

| 9 | 12 April | Boston Uprising | 2 | – | 3 | Hangzhou Spark | Burbank, CA |
| | 5:30 pm PST | Recap | | | | | Blizzard Arena |
| | | 1 | Oasis | | | 2 | |
| | | 3 | Temple of Anubis | | | 2 | |
| | | 4 | Blizzard World | | | 3 | |
| | | 0 | Junkertown | | | 1 | |
| | | 1 | Lijang Tower | | | 2 | |

| 10 | 19 April | Hangzhou Spark | 3 | – | 2 | Guangzhou Charge | Burbank, CA |
| | 8:30 pm PST | Recap | | | | | Blizzard Arena |
| | | 0 | Busan | | | 2 | |
| | | 2 | Paris | | | 0 | |
| | | 1 | King's Row | | | 2 | |
| | | 2 | Watchpoint: Gibraltar | | | 1 | |
| | | 2 | Oasis | | | 0 | |

| 12 | 21 April | Hangzhou Spark | 0 | – | 4 | San Francisco Shock | Burbank, CA |
| | 3:00 pm PST | Recap | | | | | Blizzard Arena |
| | | 1 | Lijiang Tower | | | 2 | |
| | | 4 | Paris | | | 5 | |
| | | 0 | Eichenwalde | | | 3 | |
| | | 1 | Rialto | | | 3 | |

| 12 | 27 April | Hangzhou Spark | 3 | – | 1 | Chengdu Hunters | Allen, TX |
| | 11:25 am PST | Recap | | | | | Allen Event Center |
| | | 2 | Busan | | | 1 | |
| | | 3 | Temple of Anubis | | | 2 | |
| | | 1 | Blizzard World | | | 2 | |
| | | 5 | Junkertown | | | 4 | |

| 13 | 28 April | Hangzhou Spark | 3 | – | 2 | Paris Eternal | Allen, TX |
| | 10:00 am PST | Details | | | | | Allen Event Center |
| | | 2 | Lijiang Tower | | | 1 | |
| | | 2 | Temple of Anubis | | | 3 | |
| | | 5 | Eichenwalde | | | 6 | |
| | | 3 | Junkertown | | | 2 | |
| | | 2 | Busan | | | 0 | |

| 14 | 5 May | Seoul Dynasty | 1 | – | 3 | Hangzhou Spark | Burbank, CA |
| | 4:30 pm PST | Details | | | | | Blizzard Arena |
| | | 2 | Lijiang Tower | | | 0 | |
| | | 3 | Hanamura | | | 4 | |
| | | 4 | Blizzard World | | | 5 | |
| | | 3 | Rialto | | | 4 | |

Stage 3 (6–1)

| 15 | 8 June | Hangzhou Spark | 4 | – | 0 | Philadelphia Fusion | Burbank, CA |
| | 12:00 noon PST | Details | | | | | Blizzard Arena |
| | | 2 | Oasis | | | 0 | |
| | | 2 | Paris | | | 1 | |
| | | 3 | Eichenwalde | | | 0 | |
| | | 3 | Watchpoint: Gibraltar | | | 2 | |

| 16 | 13 June | Hangzhou Spark | 1 | – | 3 | Vancouver Titans | Burbank, CA |
| | 9:15 pm PST | Details | | | | | Blizzard Arena |
| | | 0 | Oasis | | | 2 | |
| | | 3 | Horizon Lunar Colony | | | 2 | |
| | | 2 | Numbani | | | 3 | |
| | | 0 | Havana | | | 1 | |

| 17 | 15 June | Washington Justice | 0 | – | 3 | Hangzhou Spark | Burbank, CA |
| | 12:00 noon PST | Details | | | | | Blizzard Arena |
| | | 0 | Ilios | | | 2 | |
| | | 1 | Paris | | | 1 | |
| | | 0 | Hollywood | | | 3 | |
| | | 0 | Watchpoint: Gibraltar | | | 3 | |

| 18 | 20 June | Hangzhou Spark | 3 | – | 0 | Dallas Fuel | Burbank, CA |
| | 7:30 pm PST | Details | | | | | Blizzard Arena |
| | | 2 | Nepal | | | 0 | |
| | | 4 | Horizon Lunar Colony | | | 4 | |
| | | 3 | Numbani | | | 1 | |
| | | 3 | Havana | | | 1 | |

| 19 | 22 June | Hangzhou Spark | 3 | – | 2 | Seoul Dynasty | Burbank, CA |
| | 5:15 pm PST | Details | | | | | Blizzard Arena |
| | | 2 | Ilios | | | 0 | |
| | | 3 | Horizon Lunar Colony | | | 2 | |
| | | 0 | Numbani | | | 1 | |
| | | 2 | Havana | | | 3 | |
| | | 2 | Oasis | | | 0 | |

| 20 | 27 June | Hangzhou Spark | 3 | – | 2 | Los Angeles Valiant | Burbank, CA |
| | 5:30 pm PST | Details | | | | | Blizzard Arena |
| | | 2 | Ilios | | | 1 | |
| | | 0 | Volskaya Industries | | | 1 | |
| | | 2 | Hollywood | | | 1 | |
| | | 2 | Dorado | | | 3 | |
| | | 2 | Oasis | | | 0 | |

| 21 | 29 June | Florida Mayhem | 0 | – | 4 | Hangzhou Spark | Burbank, CA |
| | 3:30 pm PST | Details | | | | | Blizzard Arena |
| | | 0 | Nepal | | | 2 | |
| | | 1 | Volskaya Industries | | | 2 | |
| | | 0 | Eichenwalde | | | 3 | |
| | | 1 | Dorado | | | 3 | |

Stage 4 (4–3)

| 22 | 27 July | Atlanta Reign | 3 | – | 1 | Hangzhou Spark | Burbank, CA |
| | 5:15 pm PST | Details | | | | | Blizzard Arena |
| | | 2 | Ilios | | | 0 | |
| | | 2 | Temple of Anubis | | | 1 | |
| | | 2 | King's Row | | | 3 | |
| | | 1 | Route 66 | | | 0 | |

| 23 | 2 August | Guangzhou Charge | 3 | – | 0 | Hangzhou Spark | Burbank, CA |
| | 9:15 pm PST | Details | | | | | Blizzard Arena |
| | | 2 | Lijiang Tower | | | 1 | |
| | | 2 | Volskaya Industries | | | 0 | |
| | | 3 | Blizzard World | | | 3 | |
| | | 3 | Junkertown | | | 2 | |

| 24 | 9 August | Hangzhou Spark | 2 | – | 3 | New York Excelsior | Burbank, CA |
| | 9:15 pm PST | Details | | | | | Blizzard Arena |
| | | 0 | Ilios | | | 2 | |
| | | 3 | Volskaya Industries | | | 2 | |
| | | 3 | Hollywood | | | 2 | |
| | | 3 | Junkertown | | | 4 | |
| | | 0 | Lijiang Tower | | | 2 | |

| 25 | 10 August | Chengdu Hunters | 1 | – | 3 | Hangzhou Spark | Burbank, CA |
| | 5:15 pm PST | Details | | | | | Blizzard Arena |
| | | 2 | Ilios | | | 1 | |
| | | 0 | Hanamura | | | 1 | |
| | | 2 | King's Row | | | 3 | |
| | | 3 | Havana | | | 4 | |

| 26 | 15 August | Dallas Fuel | 1 | – | 3 | Hangzhou Spark | Burbank, CA |
| | 5:45 pm PST | Details | | | | | Blizzard Arena |
| | | 2 | Lijiang Tower | | | 0 | |
| | | 2 | Hanamura | | | 3 | |
| | | 0 | Blizzard World | | | 2 | |
| | | 3 | Junkertown | | | 4 | |

| 27 | 16 August | Los Angeles Gladiators | 2 | – | 3 | Hangzhou Spark | Burbank, CA |
| | 7:30 pm PST | Details | | | | | Blizzard Arena |
| | | 2 | Busan | | | 1 | |
| | | 1 | Temple of Anubis | | | 2 | |
| | | 4 | Blizzard World | | | 5 | |
| | | 3 | Route 66 | | | 2 | |
| | | 0 | Ilios | | | 2 | |

| 28 | 25 August | Hangzhou Spark | 4 | – | 0 | Shanghai Dragons | Los Angeles, CA |
| | 12:00 noon PST | Details | | | | | The Novo |
| | | 2 | Busan | | | 0 | |
| | | 2 | Volskaya Industries | | | 1 | |
| | | 3 | Hollywood | | | 2 | |
| | | 3 | Havana | | | 1 | |

=== Playoffs ===
2019 playoff game log
Stage 2 Playoffs (1–1)

| Quarterfinals | 9 May | Hangzhou Spark | 3 | – | 1 | London Spitfire | Burbank, CA |
| | 8:00 pm PST | Details | | | | | Blizzard Arena |
| | | 1 | Oasis | | | 2 | |
| | | 3 | Blizzard World | | | 0 | |
| | | 1 | Hanamura | | | 0 | |
| | | 1 | Watchpoint: Gibraltar | | | 0 | |

| Semifinals | 11 May | Hangzhou Spark | 0 | – | 4 | San Francisco Shock | Burbank, CA |
| | 12:00 noon PST | Details | | | | | Blizzard Arena |
| | | 0 | Busan | | | 2 | |
| | | 0 | Blizzard World | | | 3 | |
| | | 0 | Hanamura | | | 1 | |
| | | 3 | Watchpoint: Gibraltar | | | 4 | |

Stage 3 Playoffs (0–1)

| Quarterfinals | 12 July | Los Angeles Valiant | 3 | – | 2 | Hangzhou Spark | Burbank, CA |
| | 8:00 pm PST | Details | | | | | Blizzard Arena |
| | | 2 | Ilios | | | 0 | |
| | | 1 | Hollywood | | | 3 | |
| | | 1 | Paris | | | 2 | |
| | | 3 | Havana | | | 2 | |
| | | 2 | Oasis | | | 0 | |

Season Playoffs (2–2)

| First round | 5 September | Los Angeles Gladiators | 4 | – | 3 | Hangzhou Spark | Burbank, CA |
| | 7:00 pm PST | Details | | | | | Blizzard Arena |
| | | 1 | Busan | | | 2 | |
| | | 2 | King's Row | | | 0 | |
| | | 4 | Temple of Anubis | | | 3 | |
| | | 2 | Rialto | | | 1 | |
| | | 1 | Lijiang Tower | | | 2 | |
| | | 3 | Eichenwalde | | | 4 | |
| | | 3 | Watchpoint: Gibraltar | | | 1 | |

| Losers Round 1 | 7 September | Seoul Dynasty | 1 | – | 4 | Hangzhou Spark | Burbank, CA |
| | 6:00 pm PST | Details | | | | | Blizzard Arena |
| | | 0 | Busan | | | 2 | |
| | | 3 | Eichenwalde | | | 2 | |
| | | 1 | Temple of Anubis | | | 2 | |
| | | 2 | Dorado | | | 3 | |
| | | 0 | Lijiang Tower | | | 2 | |

| Losers Round 2 | 12 September | Atlanta Reign | 0 | – | 4 | Hangzhou Spark | Burbank, CA |
| | 4:00 pm PST | Details | | | | | Blizzard Arena |
| | | 0 | Busan | | | 2 | |
| | | 4 | Numbani | | | 6 | |
| | | 2 | Temple of Anubis | | | 3 | |
| | | 3 | Watchpoint: Gibraltar | | | 4 | |

| Losers Round 3 | 14 September | Hangzhou Spark | 0 | – | 4 | San Francisco Shock | Burbank, CA |
| | 12:00 noon PST | Details | | | | | Blizzard Arena |
| | | 1 | Busan | | | 2 | |
| | | 3 | King's Row | | | 4 | |
| | | 4 | Temple of Anubis | | | 5 | |
| | | 4 | Dorado | | | 5 | |
