= 2019 Overwatch League playoffs =

2019 Overwatch League Playoffs

Tournament information
- Game: Overwatch
- Dates: September 5–29
- Administrator: Activision-Blizzard
- Venue: Blizzard Arena, Burbank, California
- Teams: 8
- Purse: $3,500,000

Tournament statistics
- Matches played: 14

Grand Finals
- Location: Philadelphia, Pennsylvania
- Venue: Wells Fargo Center
- Champion: San Francisco Shock
- Runner-up: Vancouver Titans
- Finals MVP: Choi "ChoiHyoBin" Hyo-bin

The 2019 Overwatch League playoffs were the postseason tournament of the 2019 Overwatch League regular season, beginning on September 5, and concluded with the 2019 Grand Finals, the second championship match of the Overwatch League (OWL), on September 29.

Eight teams competed in the OWL Playoffs – a double-elimination tournament. The winner of each round of the Playoffs were determined by a single-match, where each match winner was determined by which team wins four maps. The final two teams remaining in the tournament advanced to the Grand Finals, which took place at Wells Fargo Center in Philadelphia, Pennsylvania.

The defending OWL champions were the London Spitfire, who won the title against the Philadelphia Fusion in the 2018 OWL Grand Finals, but they fell in the first round of the lower bracket. The San Francisco Shock defeated the Vancouver Titans in the finals to claim their first OWL Championship.

== Map pool ==
The postseason map pool consisted of twelve maps evenly distributed across the four map types.

	Control	Assault	Hybrid	Escort
Pool	Lijiang Tower	Horizon Lunar Colony	Numbani	Dorado
Pool	Ilios	Temple of Anubis	Eichenwalde	Watchpoint: Gibraltar
Pool	Busan	Hanamura	King's Row	Rialto

== Participants ==
Eight teams qualified for the Season Playoffs. The two division leaders from the regular season were awarded the top two seeds, the following top four teams, based on regular season standings, were awarded seeds three through six, and the top two teams from the Play-In Tournament were awarded seeds seven and eight.

Seed	Team	Division	Record	MR	MD
1	Vancouver Titans	PAC	25–3	89–28–0	+61
2	New York Excelsior	ATL	22–6	78–38–3	+40
3	San Francisco Shock	PAC	23–5	92–26–0	+66
4	Hangzhou Spark	PAC	18–10	64–52–4	+12
5	Los Angeles Gladiators	PAC	17–11	67–48–3	+19
6	Atlanta Reign	ATL	16–12	69–50–1	+19
7	London Spitfire	ATL	16–12	58–52–6	+6
8	Seoul Dynasty	PAC	15–13	64–50–3	+14

=== Bracket ===
First Round; September 5–6	Winners Round 1 September 8	Winners Round 2 September 13	Grand Finals; September 29
1	Vancouver Titans	4
8	Seoul Dynasty	2
1	Vancouver Titans	4
5	Los Angeles Gladiators	2
4	Hangzhou Spark	3
5	Los Angeles Gladiators	4
1	Vancouver Titans	4
2	New York Excelsior	3
2	New York Excelsior	4
7	London Spitfire	1
2	New York Excelsior	4
6	Atlanta Reign	2
3	San Francisco Shock	3
6	Atlanta Reign	4	1	Vancouver Titans	0
3	San Francisco Shock	4
Losers Round 1 September 7	Losers Round 2 September 12	Losers Round 3 September 14	Losers Round 4 September 15
6	Atlanta Reign	0
4	Hangzhou Spark	4	4	Hangzhou Spark	4	2	New York Excelsior	0
8	Seoul Dynasty	1	4	Hangzhou Spark	0	3	San Francisco Shock	4
3	San Francisco Shock	4
5	Los Angeles Gladiators	0
3	San Francisco Shock	4	3	San Francisco Shock	4
7	London Spitfire	0

== Matches ==
=== First Round ===
First round	September 5	Seoul Dynasty	2	–	4	Vancouver Titans	Burbank, CA
	4:00 pm PST	Details					Blizzard Arena
		1	Lijiang Tower			2	
		3	Numbani			1	
		1	Horizon Lunar Colony			0	
		1	Watchpoint: Gibraltar			3	
		1	Busan			2	
		0	Eichenwalde			1	

First round	September 5	Los Angeles Gladiators	4	–	3	Hangzhou Spark	Burbank, CA
	7:00 pm PST	Details					Blizzard Arena
		1	Busan			2	
		2	King's Row			0	
		4	Temple of Anubis			3	
		2	Rialto			1	
		1	Lijiang Tower			2	
		3	Eichenwalde			4	
		3	Watchpoint: Gibraltar			1	

First round	September 6	London Spitfire	1	–	4	New York Excelsior	Burbank, CA
	4:00 pm PST	Details					Blizzard Arena
		0	Busan			2	
		3	Numbani			4	
		3	Temple of Anubis			4	
		2	Watchpoint: Gibraltar			1	
		0	Ilios			2	

First round	September 6	Atlanta Reign	4	–	3	San Francisco Shock	Burbank, CA
	7:00 pm PST	Details					Blizzard Arena
		2	Busan			1	
		0	Numbani			3	
		1	Horizon Lunar Colony			0	
		1	Watchpoint: Gibraltar			2	
		2	Lijiang Tower			0	
		5	King's Row			6	
		3	Rialto			2	

=== Losers Round 1 ===
Losers Round 1	September 7	Seoul Dynasty	1	–	4	Hangzhou Spark	Burbank, CA
	6:00 pm PST	Details					Blizzard Arena
		0	Busan			2	
		3	Eichenwalde			2	
		1	Temple of Anubis			2	
		2	Dorado			3	
		0	Lijiang Tower			2	

Losers Round 1	September 7	London Spitfire	0	–	4	San Francisco Shock	Burbank, CA
	9:00 pm PST	Details					Blizzard Arena
		1	Busan			2	
		2	Numbani			3	
		1	Horizon Lunar Colony			2	
		1	Watchpoint: Gibraltar			2	

=== Winners Round 1 ===
Winners Round 1	September 8	Los Angeles Gladiators	2	–	4	Vancouver Titans	Burbank, CA
	12:00 noon PST	Details					Blizzard Arena
		0	Busan			2	
		3	King's Row			1	
		3	Temple of Anubis			4	
		4	Rialto			3	
		1	Lijiang Tower			2	
		1	Eichenwalde			2	

Winners Round 1	September 8	Atlanta Reign	2	–	4	New York Excelsior	Burbank, CA
	3:00 pm PST	Details					Blizzard Arena
		1	Busan			2	
		4	King's Row			5	
		2	Hanamura			1	
		1	Rialto			2	
		2	Lijiang Tower			0	
		2	Numbani			3	

=== Losers Round 2 ===
Losers Round 2	September 12	Atlanta Reign	0	–	4	Hangzhou Spark	Burbank, CA
	4:00 pm PST	Details					Blizzard Arena
		0	Busan			2	
		4	Numbani			6	
		2	Temple of Anubis			3	
		3	Watchpoint: Gibraltar			4	

Losers Round 2	September 12	Los Angeles Gladiators	0	–	4	San Francisco Shock	Burbank, CA
	7:00 pm PST	Details					Blizzard Arena
		0	Busan			2	
		2	King's Row			3	
		2	Horizon Lunar Colony			3	
		3	Rialto			4	

=== Winners Round 2 ===
Winners Round 2	September 13	New York Excelsior	3	–	4	Vancouver Titans	Burbank, CA
	7:00 pm PST	Details					Blizzard Arena
		0	Lijiang Tower			2	
		3	King's Row			2	
		3	Temple of Anubis			2	
		2	Watchpoint: Gibraltar			3	
		0	Busan			2	
		6	Numbani			3	
		1	Dorado			3	

=== Losers Round 3 ===
Losers Round 3	September 14	Hangzhou Spark	0	–	4	San Francisco Shock	Burbank, CA
	12:00 noon PST	Details					Blizzard Arena
		1	Busan			2	
		3	King's Row			4	
		4	Temple of Anubis			5	
		4	Dorado			5	

=== Losers Round 4 ===
Losers Round 4	September 15	San Francisco Shock	4	–	0	New York Excelsior	Burbank, CA
	12:00 noon PST	Details					Blizzard Arena
		2	Lijiang Tower			1	
		3	King's Row			2	
		6	Temple of Anubis			5	
		3	Rialto			2	

=== Grand Finals ===
Grand Finals	September 29	San Francisco Shock	4	–	0	Vancouver Titans	Philadelphia, PA
	3:00 pm EDT	Details					Wells Fargo Center
		2	Lijiang Tower			0	
		4	Eichenwalde			3	
		4	Temple of Anubis			3	
		3	Watchpoint: Gibraltar			2	

== Winnings ==
Teams in the Season Playoffs competed for a total prize pool of US$3.5 million, with the payout division detailed below.

Pos	Team	Bonus
1	San Francisco Shock	$1,100,000
2	Vancouver Titans	$600,000
3	New York Excelsior	$450,000
4	Hangzhou Spark	$350,000
5	Los Angeles Gladiators	$300,000
6	Atlanta Reign	$300,000
7	London Spitfire	$200,000
8	Seoul Dynasty	$200,000

== Broadcast and viewership ==
All matches of the playoffs were live-streamed on Twitch, the Overwatch League website, and the ESPN app.

=== Telecast schedule ===
Match #	Game	Date	Matchup			Network(s)
1	First Round	Thu, September 5, 4:00 p.m. PDT	Seoul Dynasty	2–4	Vancouver Titans	Disney XD/ESPNews
2	First Round	Thu, September 5, 7:00 p.m. PDT	Los Angeles Gladiators	4–3	Hangzhou Spark	ESPNews
3	First Round	Fri, September 6, 4:00 p.m. PDT	London Spitfire	1–4	New York Excelsior	ESPNews
4	First Round	Fri, September 6, 7:00 p.m. PDT	Atlanta Reign	4–3	San Francisco Shock	ESPNews
5	Losers Round 1	Sat, September 7, 6:00 p.m. PDT	Seoul Dynasty	1–4	Hangzhou Spark	Disney XD
6	Losers Round 1	Sat, September 7, 9:00 p.m. PDT	London Spitfire	0–4	San Francisco Shock	ESPNews
7	Winners Round 1	Sun, September 8, 12:00 p.m. PDT	Los Angeles Gladiators	2–4	Vancouver Titans	Disney XD
8	Winners Round 1	Sun, September 8, 3:00 p.m. PDT	Atlanta Reign	2–4	New York Excelsior	ESPNews
9	Losers Round 2	Thu, September 12, 4:00 p.m. PDT	Atlanta Reign	0–4	Hangzhou Spark	Disney XD
10	Losers Round 2	Thu, September 12, 7:00 p.m. PDT	Los Angeles Gladiators	0–4	San Francisco Shock	Disney XD
11	Winners Round 2	Fri, September 13, 4:00 p.m. PDT	New York Excelsior	3–4	Vancouver Titans	Disney XD/ESPNews
12	Losers Round 3	Sat, September 14, 12:00 p.m. PDT	Hangzhou Spark	0–4	San Francisco Shock	Disney XD
13	Losers Round 4	Sun, September 15, 12:00 p.m. PDT	San Francisco Shock	4–0	New York Excelsior	Disney XD
14	Grand Finals	Sun, September 29, 12:00 p.m. PDT	San Francisco Shock	4–0	Vancouver Titans	ABC
