= 2019 Vancouver Titans season =

- Pacific Division champions
- Head coach: Hwang Ji-sub
- Owner: Francesco Aquilini
- Division: Pacific

Results
- Record: 25–3 (.893)
- Place: Pacific: 1st; League: 1st
- Stage 1 Playoffs: Champions
- Stage 2 Playoffs: Finals
- Stage 3 Playoffs: Semifinals
- Season Playoffs: Grand Finals
- Total Earnings: $950,000

The 2019 Vancouver Titans season was the first season of Vancouver Titans's existence in the Overwatch League as one of eight expansion franchises added for the 2019 season.

Vancouver started the season with a 4–0 sweep over the Shanghai Dragons. The team ended Stage 1 with a perfect 7–0 record and went on to win the Stage 1 Finals against the San Francisco Shock. The Titans posted another perfect 7–0 record in Stage 2; however, they lost in the Stage 2 Finals against the Shock, which ended their Overwatch League record 19-game win streak (including playoffs). The team continued their regular season dominance by winning an Overwatch League record 19 consecutive games that was not snapped until on June 23, when the Los Angeles Valiant defeated the Titans. While they qualified for the Stage 3 playoffs, Vancouver was defeated by the Shanghai Dragons in the semifinals round. The Titans lost two more times in the regular season, against the Washington Justice and Shock, to end the regular season with a league-best 25–3 record and the top seed in the season playoffs.

Vancouver started their playoff run by defeating Seoul Dynasty 4–2 in the first round to advance to the first round of the winners bracket. In that round, the Titans defeated the Los Angeles Gladiators 4–2. The win sent the team to the winners bracket final, where they took down the New York Excelsior 4–3 to advance to the Grand Finals, where they faced the San Francisco Shock. The Titans were swept 0–4 by the Shock.

== Preceding offseason ==
On December 1, Titans also announced that it had signed nine players to the team, including all eight members of the Korean Contenders Champions RunAway, and Hwang "paJion" Ji-Sub as the team's head coach. The signed players were:

- Kim "Haksal" Hyo-jong,
- Lee "Hooreg" Dong-eun,
- Seo "SeoMinSoo" Min-soo,
- Lee "Stitch" Chung-lee,
- Park "Bumper" Sang-beom,
- Choi "JJANU" Hyun-woo,
- Lee "Twilight" Ju-seok,
- Kim "RAPEL" Jun-keun, and
- Kim "SLIME" Seong-jun.

== Regular season ==
=== Stage 1 ===
Vancouver began their 2019 season on February 16 with a 4–0 sweep over Shanghai Dragons. In their second week of play, Titans won both of their matches – a 3–2 overtime match against Guangzhou Charge and a 3–1 win over San Francisco Shock. Vancouver found their fourth straight victory in week three, as the team beat Los Angeles Valiant 3–1. Week four saw Vancouver find two more wins against Paris Eternal and Chengdu Hunters. Titans finished off the stage with a sweep over Guangzhou Charge to end with a perfect 7–0 record and claim the top seed in the Stage 1 Playoffs.

Vancouver faced the Boston Uprising in the Stage 1 Quarterfinals on March 21; Titans make quick work of Uprising, sweeping them 3–0, and moved on to the semifinals against Seoul Dynasty. Titans showed a dominant performance in the semifinals, sweeping Dynasty 4–0 to move on to the Finals against San Francisco Shock.

The Stage 1 Finals took place on March 24 with the Titans taking on the sixth-seeded San Francisco Shock. The match opened on Nepal. The Shock were able to punish Vancouver main tank Park "Bumper" Sang-beom's aggressive play style throughout the map; tide-turning Earthshatters from Shock's Matthew "super" DeLisi on Reinhardt pushed the Shock to claim the first map of the series. For the second map, the match went to Nepal. Contrasted to the first map, it was Vancouver's Bumper on Reinhardt executing well-timed Earthshatters, leading to the Shock being full-held and losing the map. The Shock chose Temple of Anubis for map three; the map went to overtime rounds after both teams completed the map, but the Shock once again completed the map and prevented the Titans from doing the same. For the fourth map, Vancouver selected Dorado. While the Shock put on a solid attack, they were prevented from completing the map; the Titans easily pushed the payload further than the Shock to tie up the series. Map six went to Ilios. The Shock won the first round, the Titans evened up the map by winning the second, and the Shock took the third round. The Titans selected King's Row for map seven, and they were able to complete the map on their attack led by stellar play from SeoMinSoo on Zarya. Despite clutch plays from Grant "Moth" Espe on Lúcio, the Shock could not capture all three points on their attack. The loss tied the series up 3–3 as the match went to a finals seventh map. For the final map, the Shock selected Rialto. San Francisco completed the map with a solid time-bank remaining, but Vancouver responded by completing the map with the fastest time recorded ever in the Overwatch League. With both teams completing the map, the match went to overtime rounds. The Shock attacked first, but they were held just before they could cap the first checkpoint. With over four minutes remaining in their time bank, the Titans were able to push the payload further to claim the title of Stage 1 Champions.

=== Stage 2 ===
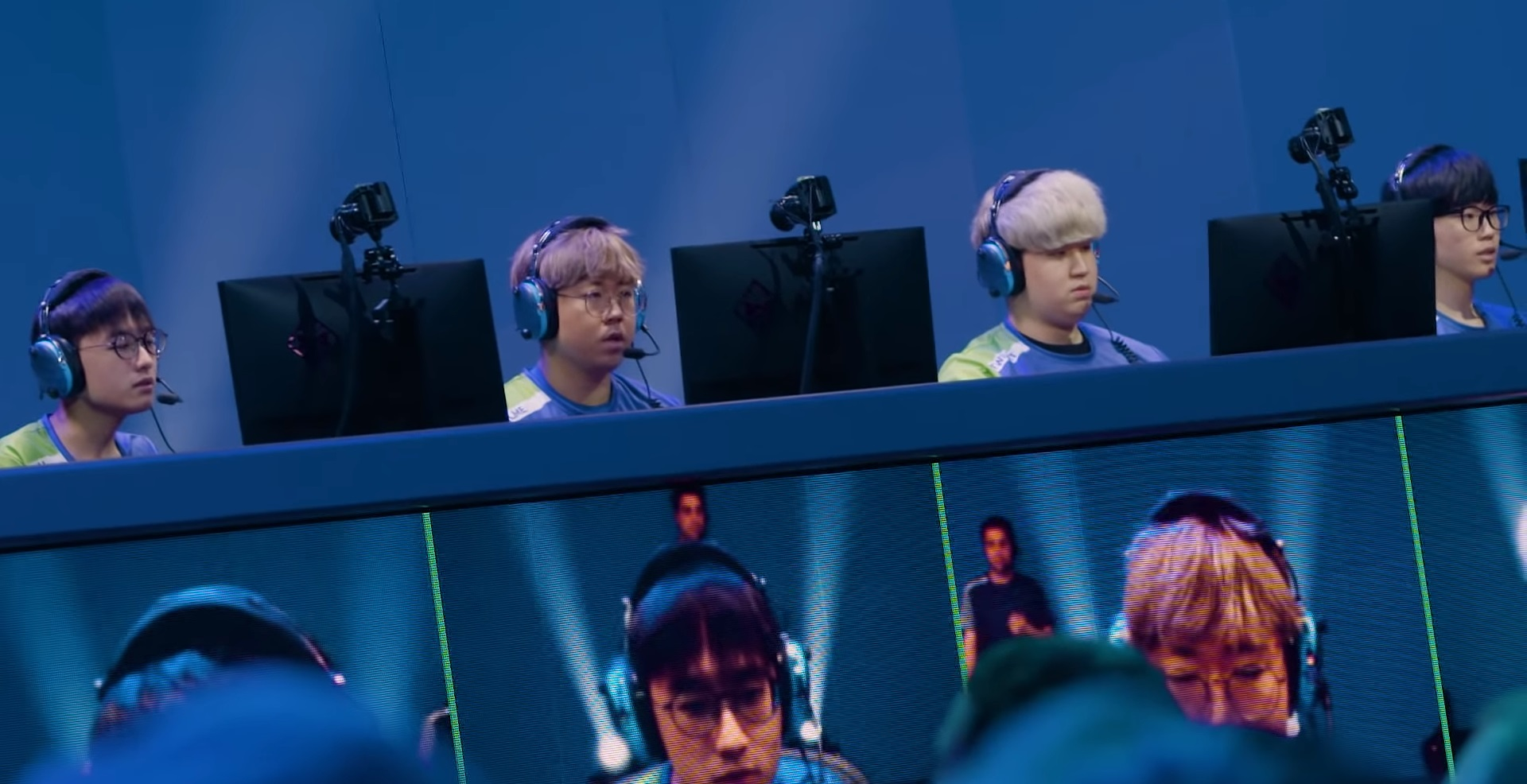
Vancouver Titans playing on April 18. From left to right: Haksal, SLIME, Twilight, JJANU.

Titans picked up Stage 2 where they left off in Stage 1, winning their first match of the stage against Hangzhou Spark 4–0. The team took both their week two matches by a score of 3–1 against Seoul Dynasty and Houston Outlaws. Vancouver won their next three matches, sweeping both Dallas Fuel and Boston Uprising and winning 3–1 against Toronto Defiant, to extend the team's winning streak to an Overwatch League record of 16 games. Titans defeated Seoul Dynasty in their final match of the Stage 2 regular season, once again ending a stage with a perfect 7–0 record, and claimed the second seed in the Stage 2 Playoffs.

Vancouver faced Dallas Fuel in the Stage 2 Quarterfinals on May 10; Titans carried over their dominance from the regular season, sweeping Fuel 3–0 in the match. Vancouver Titans faced New York Excelsior in the highly anticipated Stage 2 Semifinals. New York and Vancouver traded wins in their first two maps, but Titans were able to take the final three maps, defeating Excelsior 4–1.

The Stage 2 Finals were a rematch of the Stage 1 Finals with Vancouver Titans taking on San Francisco Shock. Shock came out with a quick lead, taking both points of the first map Lijiang Tower, but Vancouver quickly turned the tables, winning the second and third maps to go up 2–1 in the match. However, Shock was able to take three maps in a row to win the match 4–2, ending Vancouver's 19-match win streak and playoff run.

=== Stage 3 ===
Vancouver opened Stage 3 with a match against the Atlanta Reign on June 7. While the Reign were able to tie up the match 1–1 going into halftime, the Titans took the final to maps to win the match 3–1. Two days later, the team took on the Los Angeles Gladiators. The Titans took advantage of the Gladiator's unwillingness to make compositional changes and claimed a 3–1 victory. The following week, Vancouver faced the Hangzhou Spark. Amidst several close maps, the Titans only allowed the Spark to take one map, as they won 3–1 in the match. Vancouver continued their regular season dominance two days later, as they swept the Dallas Fuel 4–0. The team's next match was on June 21, when they faced the Chengdu Hunters. While Chengdu was able to take the first map of the match, Vancouver came back to take the following three and win the match, 3–1. Two days later, the Titans took on the Los Angeles Valiant. Despite winning the first map, Vancouver fell apart in the following three and lost the match 1–3, which snapped the Titans' 19-game winning streak and ended their undefeated regular season run. The Titans recovered from their first regular season loss in their final match of the stage a week later, as they swept the Los Angeles Gladiators 4–0.

As the second seed in the Stage 3 Playoffs, the Titans first faced the seventh-seeded Houston Outlaws on July 11. The series opened on Ilios; the Titans consistently won team fights, even when they had a player disadvantage, as they took the first map to go up 1–0. The second and third maps, Eichenwalde and Volskaya Industries, saw similar results; the Titans put on a stellar defensive performance in both, despite solid Widowmaker play from Outlaws' DPS LiNkzr. The Titans won the match 3–0 to move on the semifinals. For their semifinals match, the Titans faced the eighth-seeded Shanghai Dragons two days later. Dragons DPS Yang "DDing" Jin-hyeok on Pharah controlled the first map, Ilios, to give the Dragons a 1–0 lead, but the Titans came right back to even the score 1–1 going into match break. Shanghai came out of the break on fire, taking a close win on Volskaya Industries, putting up a dominant defensive performance on Havana, and closing out the series on Oasis. The DPS-heavy compositions ran by the Dragons proved to be too much to handle, as Vancouver fell 1–4.

=== Stage 4 ===
For their first match of Stage 4, which would include the implementation of an enforced 2-2-2 role lock by the league, the Titans faced the Dragons in a rematch of the Stage 3 Semifinals; Vancouver took their revenge and won the match 3–1. Three days later, the team took on the Florida Mayhem. Vancouver's DPS Kim "Haksal" Hyo-jong on Genji dominated throughout the match, as he amassed 27 Dragonblade kills during the match to set an Overwatch League record for most Dragonblade kills per 10 minutes, and the Titans went on to sweep the Mayhem 4–0. The following week, the Titans faced the Washington Justice. Justice's DPS Corey "Corey" Nigra led the Justice throughout the match, as he broke the Overwatch League record for critical hit accuracy on Hanzo; in a major upset, the Justice handed the Titans their first-ever 0–4 loss and only their second loss in the entire regular season. The team took on the London Spitfire on August 8 for their first match of week three. While the Spitfire took map one Busan, the Titans came right back with their own win on map two Temple of Anubis to tie up the series. The teams split the next to maps to push the match into a fifth tiebreaker map; Vancouver edged out London on Ilios and won the match 3–2. The team's next match was against the Philadelphia Fusion three days later; the Titans took a clean 4–0 win. For their final week of play, the Titans headed to The Novo in Los Angeles to play in the Kit Kat Rivalry Weekend, hosted by the Los Angeles Valiant. Vancouver's first match of the weekend was against the San Francisco Shock on August 24. It was the fourth meeting between the two teams in the 2019 season, and the Titans held a 2–1 head-to-head record over the Shock. After dismantling the Shock on Lijiang Tower, Vancouver fell on Volskaya Industries. The two teams traded wins on maps three and four, pushing the match to a fifth tiebreaker match; the Titans were dominated on map five, leading to a 2–3 match loss. The team's final match of the regular season was against the Atlantic Division Champions New York Excelsior a day later. The two teams traded map wins throughout the match; after four maps the series was tied, forcing the match to a fifth map. Vancouver and New York both took a point in the final map, Lijiang Tower, but the Titans came out on top close out the regular season with a 3–2 match victory.

== Playoffs ==
As the top seed in the season playoffs, the Titans took on the eighth-seeded Seoul Dynasty in the first round on September 5. The Titans took control of the match early, claiming Lijiang Tower in the opening map. However, the Dynasty struck right back, grabbing the following two maps, Numbani and Horizon Lunar Colony. The hope for an upset with promptly shut down from there on out, as the Titans regrouped and took victories on Watchpoint: Gibraltar, Busan, and Eichenwalde to take a 4–2 victory.

Advancing to the first round of the upper bracket, Vancouver next took on the fifth-seeded Los Angeles Gladiators on September 8. Through the first four maps, the two teams traded maps wins, as the series headed to Lijiang Tower tied 2–2. The Titans adapted to the Gladiators' aggressive playstyle and took the map win; Vancouver went to on to take map six, Eichenwalde, and won the series, 4–2, to advance to the winners final round.

For the winners' finals, the Titans took on the second-seeded New York Excelsior on September 13. Titan's DPS Kim "Haksal" Hyo-jong ran rampant on Doomfist in the first map, Lijiang Tower, as the Titans took a convincing map one win. New York sent the match to King's Row next; the Excelsior struck back in map two, completing the map on their attack and holding Vancouver from completing the same feat, due in part to a stellar performance by New York's DPS Kim "Libero" Hye-sung on Doomfist. With the series tied 1–1 coming out of a match break, Vancouver chose Temple of Anubis for the next map. Both teams managed to complete the map on their respective attacks, New York brought out an effective Bastion on their second attack, leading to a map win for the Excelsior. Titan's DPS Seo "SeoMinSoo" Min-Soo's stellar Reaper and Doomfist play, along with well-coordinated plays from Vancouver's tank line, propelled the Titans to take maps four and five, while New York struck back to tie up the series by winning map six, Numbani. For the final map, Vancouver selected Dorado; the Titans completed the map on their attack, and with a stellar defense, they held New York from doing the same. The 4–2 victory sent the Titans to the Grand Finals, where they took on the San Francisco Shock.

=== Grand Finals ===
As the higher seed in the matchup, the Titans selected control map Lijiang Tower – a map that Vancouver has been historically good on – to open the match. The Shock came out strong and took the first point of the round. In round two, the Titans came out on top of the first team fight and took first control. The two teams traded point captures in round two, but a strong performance by Shock Jay "sinatraa" Won on Doomfist sealed a map win for the Shock in the second round.

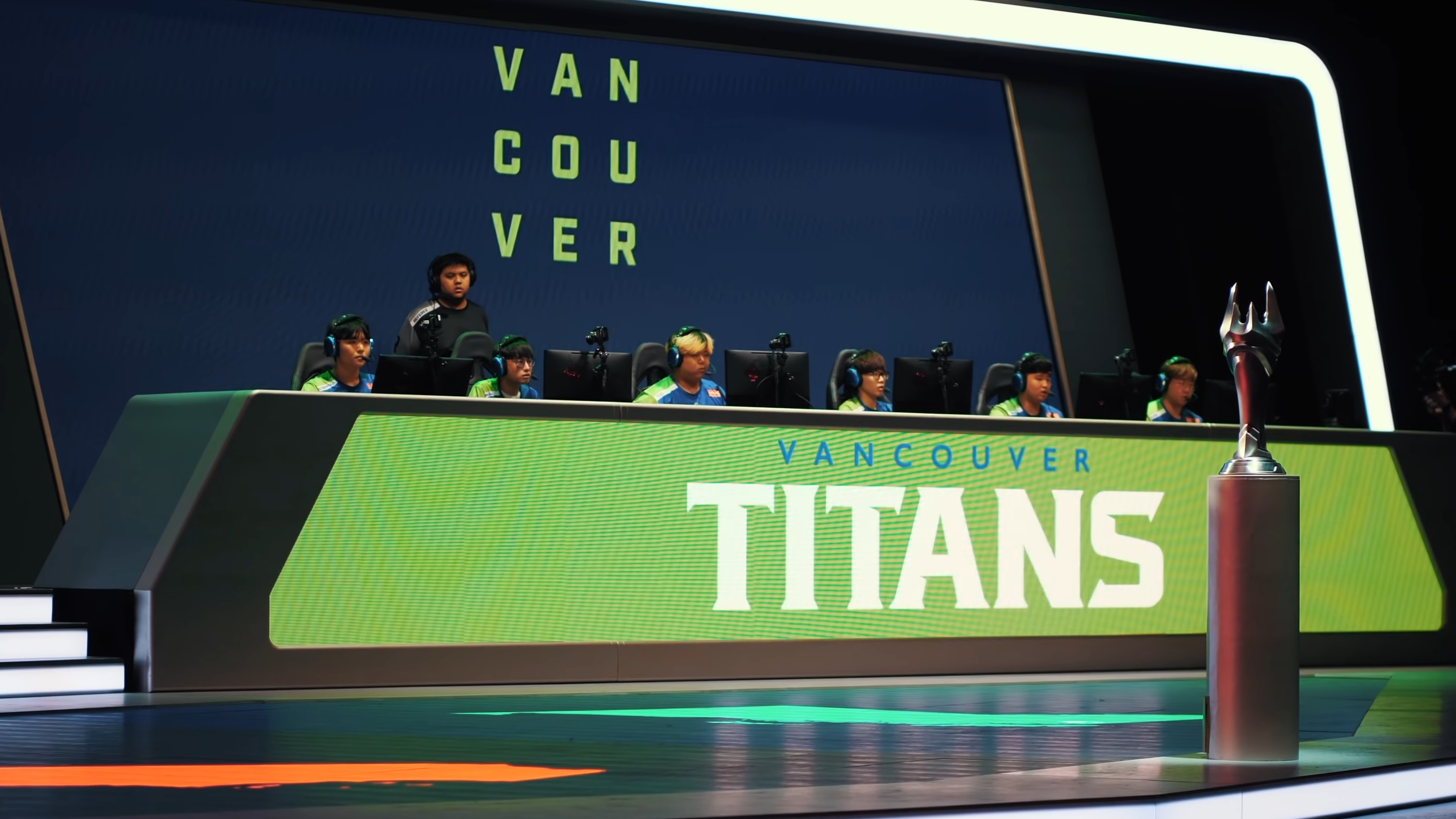
The Titans playing in the Grand Finals.

Vancouver selected Eichenwalde for map two. San Francisco attacked first and were able to capture the first point on their first attempt. As the map moved to the escort potion, the Shock did not lose a team fight as they captured the second point with over four minutes in the time bank. As the payload was escorted though the final phase of the map, Rascal used Mei's ice walls helping to both protect and elevate Architect's Bastion to give him high ground. Notably, Architect had managed to get Bastion up onto one of the chandeliers that hung near the end of the map and, subsequently, prevented the Titans from challenging the final capture from this tactical position. The Shock finished the map with 2:49 in the time bank. For their defense, the Shock opted to defend with Rascal on Pharah, while Architect remained on Bastion. The Titans responded well, and through a lengthy team fight, they were able to capture the first point and began escorting the payload. After Vancouver reached the second checkpoint, the Shock were able to stop the Titans in the first fight of the third phase, but the Titans came back in full force and finished the map with 2:47 in their time bank. As both teams completed the map, the map went to overtime rounds; Vancouver attacked first, but they were only able to capture about half of the first point. On San Francisco's attack, they were held up under the choke point for an extended amount of time, but the team was able to touch the capture area as time ran out to force an overtime timer; a clutch ultimate from Choi "ChoiHyoBin" Hyo-bin on Sigma led to the Shock closing out the map with a win.

Coming out of halftime, the Titan's chose assault map Temple of Anubis for the match's third map; the Shock brought sinatraa and Striker back in for Rascal and Architect. The Titans attacked first and were able to capture the first point on their first attempt. After a few failed attempts, the Titans finally broke through the Shock's second point defenses and, after a lengthy stagger delay from the Shock, finished the map with 1:34 remaining. On defense, the Titans focused on shutting down sinatraa's Doomfist, and found some success, as they were able to hold of the Shock's first and second attacks. However, the Shock finally broke through the Titan defense as the timer ran out and captured the first point in overtime. San Francisco carried that momentum into the second point and won the first team fight to finish the map with 2:12 in their time bank. The Titans had the first attack in overtime rounds; after getting shut down multiple times, Haksal's Doomfist created an opening for the Titans to take the first point with less than 15 seconds remaining. With only time for one more attack, the Titan's failed to capture the second point. The Shock responded on their attack by taking the first point on their first attempt. Striker found an early pick as the Shock attacked the second point, but Vancouver was able to recover and held back the Shock. San Francisco responded by taking down Vancouver in the next team fight and took their third map win.

With the Shock at match point, the Titans selected Watchpoint: Gibraltar for map four. Defending first, Vancouver overcame the Bastion/Mei composition run by San Francisco in the first team fight right at the beginning of the map; however, the Shock eventually broke through the Titan defense and went on to complete the map with 1:52 remaining. Vancouver struggled to push the payload to the first checkpoint on their attack, largely due to a stellar performance by Shock's DPS Rascal on Pharah. The Titans eventually broke through and pushed the payload past the second checkpoint. However, Vancouver could not find a footing in the final phase of the map. With Architect as Bastion on the high ground defending the final checkpoint of the map, the Shock held the Titans from completing the map and claimed a 4–0 sweep, ending the Titan's season in second place.

== Final roster ==
2019 Vancouver Titans roster
Players
Coaches

Role	No.	Handle	Name	Nationality
Damage	1	Haksal	Kim Hyo-jong	South Korea
Damage	9	Hooreg	Lee Dong-eun	South Korea
Damage	18	SeoMinSoo	Seo Min-soo	South Korea
Damage	22	Stitch	Lee Chung-hee	South Korea
Tank	4	Bumper	Park Sang-beom	South Korea
Tank	40	TiZi	Hwang Jang-hyeon	South Korea
Tank	14	JJANU	Choi Hyeon-woo	South Korea
Support	7	Twilight	Lee Joo-seok	South Korea
Support	11	Rapel	Kim Jung-geun	South Korea
Support	28	SLIME	Kim Sung-jun	South Korea

Head coach

- Hwang Ji-sub

Legend:
- (I) Inactive
- (S) Suspended
- (2W) Two-way player
- Substitute
- (injured) Injury / Illness

Latest roster transaction: August 16, 2019.

=== Transactions ===
Transactions of/for players on the roster during the 2019 regular season:

- On August 16, the Titans signed Hwang "TiZi" Jang-hyeon.

== Standings ==
=== Record by stage ===
Stage	Pld	W	L	Pct	MW	ML	MT	MD	Pos
1	7	7	0	1.000	24	6	0	+18	1
2	7	7	0	1.000	25	3	0	+22	2
3	7	6	1	.857	21	7	0	+14	2
4 (Note: No stage playoffs were held for Stage 4.)	7	5	2	.714	19	12	0	+7	5
Overall	28	25	3	.893	89	28	0	+61	1
Qualified for playoffs • Qualified for play-in tournament

=== League ===
Pos	Div	Team	Pld	W	L	PCT	MW	ML	MT	MD	Qualification
1	PAC	Vancouver Titans	28	25	3	0.893	89	28	0	+61	Advance to season playoffs (division leaders)
2	ATL	New York Excelsior	28	22	6	0.786	78	38	3	+40	Advance to season playoffs (division leaders)
3	PAC	San Francisco Shock	28	23	5	0.821	92	26	0	+66	Advance to season playoffs
4	PAC	Hangzhou Spark	28	18	10	0.643	64	52	4	+12	Advance to season playoffs
5	PAC	Los Angeles Gladiators	28	17	11	0.607	67	48	3	+19	Advance to season playoffs
6	ATL	Atlanta Reign	28	16	12	0.571	69	50	1	+19	Advance to season playoffs
7	ATL	London Spitfire	28	16	12	0.571	58	52	6	+6	Advance to play-ins
8	PAC	Seoul Dynasty	28	15	13	0.536	64	50	3	+14	Advance to play-ins
9	PAC	Guangzhou Charge	28	15	13	0.536	61	57	1	+4	Advance to play-ins
10	ATL	Philadelphia Fusion	28	15	13	0.536	57	60	3	−3	Advance to play-ins
11	PAC	Shanghai Dragons	28	13	15	0.464	51	61	3	−10	Advance to play-ins
12	PAC	Chengdu Hunters	28	13	15	0.464	55	66	1	−11	Advance to play-ins
13	PAC	Los Angeles Valiant	28	12	16	0.429	56	61	4	−5	
14	ATL	Paris Eternal	28	11	17	0.393	46	67	3	−21	
15	PAC	Dallas Fuel	28	10	18	0.357	43	70	3	−27	
16	ATL	Houston Outlaws	28	9	19	0.321	47	69	3	−22	
17	ATL	Toronto Defiant	28	8	20	0.286	39	72	4	−33	
18	ATL	Washington Justice	28	8	20	0.286	39	72	6	−33	
19	ATL	Boston Uprising	28	8	20	0.286	41	78	2	−37	
20	ATL	Florida Mayhem	28	6	22	0.214	36	75	5	−39	

Source: The Overwatch League
Rules for classification: 1) winning percentage; 2) map differential; 3) head-to-head record; 4) head-to-head map differential

== Game log ==
=== Regular season ===
2019 game log (Regular season record: 25–3)
Stage 1 (7–0)

1	February 16	Vancouver Titans	4	–	0	Shanghai Dragons	Burbank, CA
		Recap					Blizzard Arena
		2	Busan			1	
		1	Hollywood			0	
		3	Temple of Anubis			2	
		2	Dorado			1	

2	February 23	Vancouver Titans	3	–	2	Guangzhou Charge	Burbank, CA
		Recap					Blizzard Arena
		0	Nepal			2	
		1	Hollywood			0	
		3	Volskaya Industries			2	
		3	Route 66			4	
		2	Ilios			1	

3	February 24	Vancouver Titans	3	–	1	San Francisco Shock	Burbank, CA
		Recap					Blizzard Arena
		2	Busan			0	
		5	King's Row			4	
		2	Volskaya Industries			1	
		4	Route 66			5	

4	March 01	Vancouver Titans	3	–	1	Los Angeles Valiant	Burbank, CA
		Recap					Blizzard Arena
		2	Nepal			0	
		3	King's Row			2	
		1	Horizon Lunar Colony			0	
		2	Rialto			3	

5	March 08	Paris Eternal	0	–	4	Vancouver Titans	Burbank, CA
		Recap					Blizzard Arena
		1	Ilios			2	
		2	Numbani			3	
		1	Horizon Lunar Colony			2	
		2	Rialto			3	

6	March 10	Vancouver Titans	3	–	2	Chengdu Hunters	Burbank, CA
		Recap					Blizzard Arena
		2	Ilios			0	
		1	Hollywood			2	
		1	Temple of Anubis			2	
		3	Route 66			2	
		2	Nepal			0	

7	March 17	Guangzhou Charge	0	–	4	Vancouver Titans	Burbank, CA
		Recap					Blizzard Arena
		1	Ilios			2	
		1	Numbani			3	
		1	Volskaya Industries			2	
		1	Dorado			3	

Stage 2 (7–0)

8	April 07	Vancouver Titans	4	–	0	Hangzhou Spark	Burbank, CA
	3:30 pm PST	Recap					Blizzard Arena
		2	Oasis			0	
		3	Hanamura			2	
		4	King's Row			3	
		3	Watchpoint: Gibraltar			2	

9	April 11	Vancouver Titans	3	–	1	Seoul Dynasty	Burbank, CA
	7:00 pm PST	Recap					Blizzard Arena
		2	Busan			0	
		3	Temple of Anubis			2	
		3	Eichenwalde			1	
		2	Rialto			3	

10	April 13	Vancouver Titans	3	–	1	Houston Outlaws	Burbank, CA
	1:30 pm PST	Recap					Blizzard Arena
		0	Busan			2	
		1	Paris			0	
		2	Eichenwalde			1	
		1	Rialto			0	

11	April 18	Vancouver Titans	4	–	0	Dallas Fuel	Burbank, CA
	8:30 pm PST	Recap					Blizzard Arena
		2	Lijiang Tower			0	
		2	Hanamura			1	
		4	Blizzard World			3	
		3	Junkertown			2	

12	April 21	Vancouver Titans	4	–	0	Boston Uprising	Burbank, CA
	12:00 noon PST	Recap					Blizzard Arena
		2	Lijiang Tower			0	
		3	Paris			2	
		3	King's Row			2	
		5	Watchpoint: Gibraltar			3	

13	May 03	Toronto Defiant	1	–	3	Vancouver Titans	Burbank, CA
	7:00 pm PST	Recap					Blizzard Arena
		0	Oasis			2	
		2	Temple of Anubis			0	
		1	King's Row			2	
		2	Junkertown			3	

14	May 04	Seoul Dynasty	0	–	4	Vancouver Titans	Burbank, CA
	3:00 pm PST	Recap					Blizzard Arena
		1	Lijiang Tower			2	
		1	Temple of Anubis			2	
		3	Blizzard World			4	
		1	Junkertown			3	

Stage 3 (6–1)

15	June 07	Vancouver Titans	3	–	1	Atlanta Reign	Burbank, CA
	1:45 pm PST	Details					Blizzard Arena
		2	Nepal			0	
		2	Paris			3	
		1	Hollywood			0	
		6	Watchpoint: Gibraltar			5	

16	June 09	Vancouver Titans	3	–	1	Los Angeles Gladiators	Burbank, CA
	5:15 pm PST	Details					Blizzard Arena
		2	Ilios			0	
		2	Paris			3	
		2	Hollywood			1	
		3	Watchpoint: Gibraltar			0	

17	June 13	Hangzhou Spark	1	–	3	Vancouver Titans	Burbank, CA
	9:15 pm PST	Details					Blizzard Arena
		0	Oasis			2	
		3	Horizon Lunar Colony			2	
		2	Numbani			3	
		0	Havana			1	

18	June 15	Dallas Fuel	0	–	4	Vancouver Titans	Burbank, CA
	3:30 pm PST	Details					Blizzard Arena
		0	Ilios			2	
		2	Volskaya Industries			3	
		2	Eichenwalde			3	
		2	Dorado			3	

19	June 21	Chengdu Hunters	1	–	3	Vancouver Titans	Burbank, CA
	9:15 pm PST	Details					Blizzard Arena
		2	Nepal			1	
		2	Volskaya Industries			3	
		3	Hollywood			4	
		0	Havana			2	

20	June 23	Los Angeles Valiant	3	–	1	Vancouver Titans	Burbank, CA
	5:15 pm PST	Details					Blizzard Arena
		0	Oasis			2	
		2	Paris			1	
		3	Eichenwalde			2	
		3	Dorado			1	

21	June 30	Los Angeles Gladiators	0	–	4	Vancouver Titans	Burbank, CA
	12:00 noon PST	Details					Blizzard Arena
		0	Ilios			2	
		3	Horizon Lunar Colony			4	
		1	Numbani			3	
		0	Watchpoint: Gibraltar			1	

Stage 4 (5–2)

22	July 25	Shanghai Dragons	1	–	3	Vancouver Titans	Burbank, CA
	9:10 pm PST	Details					Blizzard Arena
		2	Lijiang Tower			0	
		2	Temple of Anubis			3	
		0	King's Row			1	
		4	Junkertown			5	

23	July 28	Vancouver Titans	4	–	0	Florida Mayhem	Burbank, CA
	3:30 pm PST	Details					Blizzard Arena
		2	Lijiang Tower			1	
		2	Temple of Anubis			1	
		3	Blizzard World			1	
		3	Junkertown			2	

24	August 04	Vancouver Titans	0	–	4	Washington Justice	Burbank, CA
	3:30 pm PST	Details					Blizzard Arena
		0	Ilios			2	
		1	Volskaya Industries			2	
		3	Hollywood			4	
		0	Havana			3	

25	August 08	London Spitfire	2	–	3	Vancouver Titans	Burbank, CA
	4:00 pm PST	Details					Blizzard Arena
		2	Busan			0	
		1	Temple of Anubis			2	
		1	Hollywood			0	
		4	Route 66			5	
		1	Ilios			2	

26	August 11	Philadelphia Fusion	0	–	4	Vancouver Titans	Burbank, CA
	12:00 noon PST	Details					Blizzard Arena
		1	Busan			2	
		2	Hanamura			3	
		1	Blizzard World			3	
		0	Route 66			3	

27	August 24	San Francisco Shock	3	–	2	Vancouver Titans	Los Angeles, CA
	5:30 pm PST	Details					The Novo
		0	Lijiang Tower			2	
		4	Volskaya Industries			2	
		4	King's Row			5	
		3	Havana			1	
		2	Busan			0	

28	August 25	New York Excelsior	2	–	3	Vancouver Titans	Los Angeles, CA
	3:30 pm PST	Details					The Novo
		0	Ilios			2	
		2	Hanamura			1	
		2	Blizzard World			3	
		3	Havana			2	
		1	Lijiang Tower			2	

=== Playoffs ===
2019 playoff game log
Stage 1 Playoffs (3–0)

Quarterfinals	March 21	Boston Uprising	0	–	3	Vancouver Titans	Burbank, CA
	8:00 pm PST	Recap					Blizzard Arena
		0	Ilios			2	
		1	King's Row			2	
		1	Temple of Anubis			2	

Semifinals	March 23	Seoul Dynasty	0	–	4	Vancouver Titans	Burbank, CA
	12:00 noon PST	Recap					Blizzard Arena
		0	Busan			2	
		3	Hollywood			4	
		2	Temple of Anubis			3	
		3	Rialto			4	

Finals	March 24	San Francisco Shock	3	–	4	Vancouver Titans	Burbank, CA
	12:00 noon PST	Recap					Blizzard Arena
		2	Nepal			1	
		0	Numbani			1	
		4	Temple of Anubis			3	
		1	Dorado			2	
		2	Ilios			1	
		2	King's Row			3	
		3	Rialto			4	

Stage 2 Playoffs (2–1)

Quarterfinals	May 10	Dallas Fuel	0	–	3	Vancouver Titans	Burbank, CA
	8:00 pm PST	Details					Blizzard Arena
		0	Oasis			2	
		2	King's Row			3	
		0	Temple of Anubis			1	

Semifinals	May 11	New York Excelsior	1	–	4	Vancouver Titans	Burbank, CA
	3:00 pm PST	Details					Blizzard Arena
		1	Busan			2	
		3	Blizzard World			1	
		2	Hanamura			3	
		2	Rialto			3	
		1	Lijang Tower			2	

Finals	May 12	Vancouver Titans	2	–	4	San Francisco Shock	Burbank, CA
	10:00 am PST	Details					Blizzard Arena
		0	Lijang Tower			2	
		5	King's Row			4	
		1	Paris			0	
		3	Watchpoint: Gibraltar			4	
		0	Oasis			2	
		1	Blizzard World			3	

Stage 3 Playoffs (1–1)

Quarterfinals	July 11	Houston Outlaws	0	–	3	Vancouver Titans	Burbank, CA
	6:00 pm PST	Details					Blizzard Arena
		0	Ilios			2	
		2	Eichenwalde			3	
		2	Volskaya Industries			3	

Semifinals	July 13	Shanghai Dragons	4	–	1	Vancouver Titans	Burbank, CA
	7:00 pm PST	Details					Blizzard Arena
		2	Ilios			0	
		3	Numbani			4	
		4	Volskaya Industries			3	
		1	Havana			0	
		2	Oasis			1	

Season Playoffs (2–1)

First round	September 5	Seoul Dynasty	2	–	4	Vancouver Titans	Burbank, CA
	4:00 pm PST	Details					Blizzard Arena
		1	Lijiang Tower			2	
		3	Numbani			1	
		1	Horizon Lunar Colony			0	
		1	Watchpoint: Gibraltar			3	
		1	Busan			2	
		0	Eichenwalde			1	

Winners Round 1	September 8	Los Angeles Gladiators	2	–	4	Vancouver Titans	Burbank, CA
	12:00 noon PST	Details					Blizzard Arena
		0	Busan			2	
		3	King's Row			1	
		3	Temple of Anubis			4	
		4	Rialto			3	
		1	Lijiang Tower			2	
		1	Eichenwalde			2	

Winners Round 2	September 13	New York Excelsior	3	–	4	Vancouver Titans	Burbank, CA
	7:00 pm PST	Details					Blizzard Arena
		0	Lijiang Tower			2	
		3	King's Row			2	
		3	Temple of Anubis			2	
		2	Watchpoint: Gibraltar			3	
		0	Busan			2	
		6	Numbani			3	
		1	Dorado			3	

Grand Finals	September 29	San Francisco Shock	4	–	0	Vancouver Titans	Philadelphia, PA
	3:00 pm EDT	Details					Wells Fargo Center
		2	Lijiang Tower			0	
		4	Eichenwalde			3	
		4	Temple of Anubis			3	
		3	Watchpoint: Gibraltar			2	

== Awards ==
Kim "Haksal" Hyo-jong and Lee "Twilight" Ju-seok were awarded the Role Star commendation for DPS and support, respectively; Haksal was also named the OWL Rookie of the year. Twilight and tank Choi "Jjanu" Hyeon-woo were finalists for the league's most valuable player award, but the Shock's Jay "Sinatraa" Won won the award.
