= Zaire (disambiguation) =

Zaire was the name between 1971 and 1997 of what is now the Democratic Republic of the Congo

Zaire may also refer to:

== Geography ==
- Zaire Province, Angola
- Congo River, formerly also called the Zaire River

== Other uses ==
- Zaire (name), includes a list of people with the given name or surname
- Zaire (currency), the currency of Congo and later Zaire from 1967 to 1997
- Zaire (play), a 1732 play by Voltaire
- Zaïre. Revue Congolaise—Congoleesch Tijdschrift, Belgian African studies journal
- Zaïre-FPAC, a decentralized Hema militant group

== See also ==
- Zaira (disambiguation)
- Zaire Use, a variation of the common mass of the Roman Catholic Church
- Air Zaïre, the national airline of Zaïre
- "In Zaire", a 1976 song by Johnny Wakelin
