= Zarya =

Zarya may refer to:

- Zorya, personification of dawn in Slavic mythology
- Zarya (antenna), a type of medium-wave broadcasting antenna used in former Soviet Union
- Zarya (ISS module) is a module of the International Space Station.
- Zarya (magazine), a Slavophile 1869–1872 magazine
- Zarya (non-magnetic ship), a Soviet research ship built in 1953 and used to research Earth's magnetic field
- Zarya (opera), an 1877 opera by Ella Adayevskaya
- Zarya (Overwatch), a player character from the video games Overwatch and Heroes of the Storm
- Zarya (polar ship), a Russian research ship sent to the Arctic during 1900–1902
- Zarya (publication), a Marxist publication
- Zarya, Russia, several rural localities in Russia
- Zarya Moonwolf, a main character in Nickelodeon's show Mysticons
- Zarya (space capsule), the name of a late 1980s project for a Soyuz spacecraft replacement
- Zarya Voroshilovgrad, former name of FC Zorya Luhansk, a Ukrainian soccer team
- Fictional starship Zarya in the 1974 Soviet science fiction film Moscow-Cassiopeia and its sequel,Teens in the Universe

== See also ==
- Zaria (disambiguation)
- Zorya (disambiguation)
- Zoria (disambiguation)
