= 2019 San Francisco Shock season =

Overwatch League team season

- Overwatch League champions
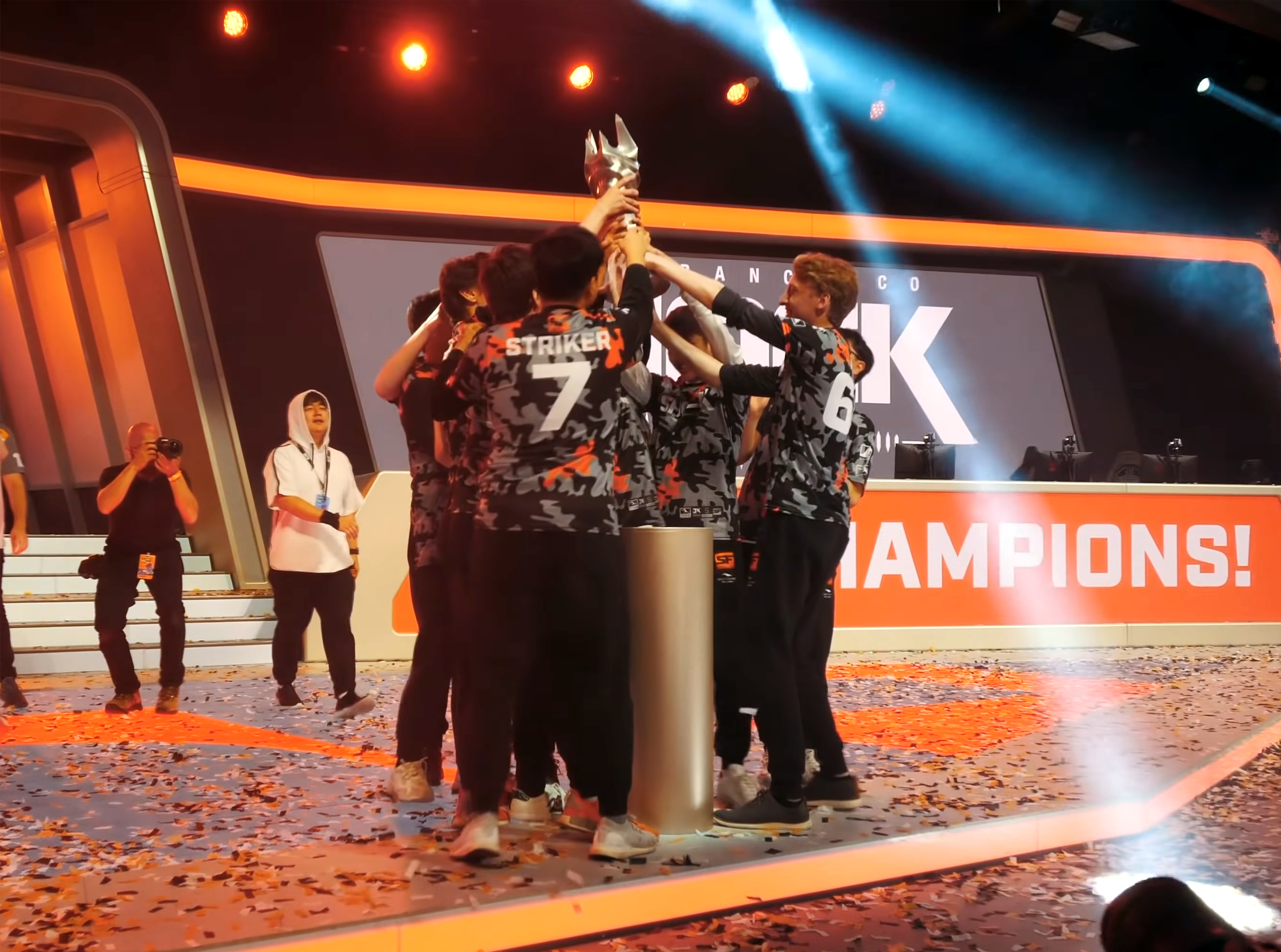
- Shock holding the Grand Finals trophy
- Head coach: Park Dae-hee
- General manager: Derrick Truong
- Owner: Andy Miller
- Division: Pacific

Results
- Record: 23–5 (.821)
- Place: Pacific: 2nd; League: 3rd
- Stage 1 Playoffs: Finals
- Stage 2 Playoffs: Champions
- Stage 3 Playoffs: Finals
- Season Playoffs: Champions
- Total Earnings: $1,500,000

The 2019 San Francisco Shock season was the second season of the San Francisco Shock's existence in the Overwatch League and their first full season under head coach Park Dae-hee. The team looked to improve from their 17–23 record from 2018 and qualify for their first stage or season playoffs.

The Shock's first match of the 2019 regular season resulted in a 4–0 sweep over the Dallas Fuel. The team followed the win by splitting the next six matches to finish Stage 1 with a 4–3 record and the sixth seed in the Stage 1 Playoffs. The team made it to the Stage 1 Finals, but they fell to the Vancouver Titans. San Francisco hit their stride in Stage 2, as the team completed the "perfect stage" with a 7–0 record and 28–0 map record. Qualified as the top seed in the Stage 2 Playoffs, the Shock defeated the Titans in the Stage 2 Finals. San Francisco dropped two matches in Stage 3, against the Houston Outlaws and Chengdu Hunters, and fell to the Shanghai Dragons in the Stage 3 Finals. The team finished the regular season with seven straight wins to post a 23–5 record, the second best in the league, and the third seed in the season playoffs.

San Francisco faced the sixth-seeded Atlanta Reign in the first round of the season playoffs, but the team fell in a heartbreaking 3–4 loss to drop to the losers bracket. The Shock responded to the loss by pulling off a dominant run in losers bracket; the team swept the London Spitfire in the first round, the Los Angeles Gladiators in the second round, the Hangzhou Spark in the third round, and the New York Excelsior in the losers finals to secure a spot in the Grand Finals, where they faced the Vancouver Titans. The Shock swept the Titans 4–0 to claim the title of Overwatch League Champions.

== Preceding offseason ==
=== Player re-signings ===
From August 1 to September 9, 2018, all Overwatch League teams that competed in the 2018 season could choose to extend their team's players' contracts. Shock released three of their players in DPS André "iddqd" Dahlström, tank David "Nomy" Lizarraga Ramirez Osmar, and support Daniel "dhaK" Martinez Paz.

=== Free agency ===
All non-expansion teams could not enter the free agency period until October 8, 2018; they were able to sign members from their respective academy team and make trades until then. Shock's first transaction was on September 18, when the team traded DPS Dante "Danteh" Cruz to Houston Outlaws in exchange for GG Esports Academy, Outlaws' academy team, main tank Yoo "Smurf" Myeong-hwan. A week later, Shock promoted Kim "Rascal" Dong-jun from their academy team NRG Esports. On October 24, Shock signed Park "Viol2t" Min-ki from Korean Overwatch Contenders team O2 Ardeont. On December 3, Shock acquired DPS Kwon "Striker" Nam-joo from Boston Uprising, bringing the team's roster total to the maximum of twelve players.

== Regular season ==
=== Stage 1 ===
The Shock began their 2019 season with a match against the Dallas Fuel on February 15. San Francisco dominated in the match, as they won all four maps to secure a 4–0 sweep to open their season. Two days later, the team took on the Los Angeles Gladiators. After four maps, the series was tied 2–2, forcing the match to a fifth tiebreaker map; the Shock were unable to secure the final map win and lost the match 2–3. For their only match of week two, San Francisco faced the Vancouver Titans on February 24. Despite solid performances by Yoo "smurf" Myeong-hwan and Jay "sinatraa" Won, the Shock fell to the Titans by score of 1–3. The Shock's next match was against the Hangzhou Spark on February 28. While San Francisco fell in the first map, Ilios, they were able to full-hold the Spark on Hollywood to tie up the series heading into halftime. The Shock went on to win in overtime rounds on Temple of Anubis and dominate on Route 66 to take a 3–1 victory. Two days later, the Shock took on the Washington Justice. San Francisco dominated throughout the entirety of the match – completing Numbani in record-breaking time in the process – and won the match with a 4–0 sweep. For their final week of Stage 1, the team first faced the undefeated New York Excelsior on March 8. San Francisco was handed their first 0–4 loss of the season, but the match was much closer than the map score showed – Busan was pushed to three rounds, Numbani was pushed to a second attack phase, Volskaya Industries was pushed to a third attack phase, and Dorado was pushed to three rounds. San Francisco took on the Paris Eternal two days later. The Shock took the first three maps to go up 3–0 heading into the final map, Dorado. San Francisco was full-held on Dorado to lose the final map, but they won the series 3–1.

After the conclusion of the Stage 1 regular season, the Shock and the Seoul Dynasty had the exact same record and map differential; by rule, the teams had to face each other in an offline tiebreaker match to determine seeding for the Stage 1 Playoffs. San Francisco won the match to claim the sixth seed in the playoffs.

The Shock faced the third-seeded Toronto Defiant in the Stage 1 Quarterfinals on March 22. The match opened on Busan. Toronto ran mainly Sombra-focused team compositions; while the map was close, San Francisco was able to adapt to Toronto's compositions and took the first map. The Shock dominated on the following map, King's Row; led by main tank Matthew "super" DeLisi, the Shock were able to capture all three points on their attack and full-held the Defiant to take a 2–0 lead heading into the match break. On the map three, Horizon Lunar Colony, Toronto was able to capture both points, but San Francisco did the same with a larger time-bank. The Shock capitalized on their time advantage in overtime rounds to win the map and the series by a score of 3–0.

Advancing to the Stage 1 Semifinals, San Francisco faced the Philadelphia Fusion a day later. The Shock did not allow Philadelphia to claim a point on Ilios to open the match with a map win. On map two, Hollywood, the Shock captured all three points on their attack, thanks in part to support duo Grant "Moth" Espe and Park "Viol2t" Min-ki performing exceptionally well by keeping their teammates healed throughout all of the Fusion's aggressive attacks. San Francisco subsequently prevented the Fusion from claiming a single point on their attack to enter the match break up 2–0. Following the break, the match went to Horizon Lunar Colony, where Philadelphia was able to take both points on their attack, but San Francisco completed the same on their attack and took the map in overtime rounds. San Francisco closed out the match by completing the entirety of Rialto and full-holding Philadelphia to cement a 4–0 victory and advance to the Stage 1 Finals.

The Stage 1 Finals took place on March 24 with the Shock taking on the top-seeded Vancouver Titans. The match opened on Nepal. The Shock were able to punish Vancouver main tank Park "Bumper" Sang-beom's aggressive play style throughout the map; tide-turning Earthshatters from Shock's Matthew "super" DeLisi on Reinhardt pushed the Shock to claim the first map of the series. For the second map, the match went to Nepal. Contrasted to the first map, it was Vancouver's Bumper on Reinhardt executing well-timed Earthshatters, leading to the Shock being full-held and losing the map. The Shock chose Temple of Anubis for map three; the map went to overtime rounds after both teams completed the map, but the Shock once again completed the map and prevented the Titans from doing the same. For the fourth map, Vancouver selected Dorado. While the Shock put on a solid attack, they were prevented from completing the map; the Titans easily pushed the payload further than the Shock to tie up the series. Map six went to Ilios. The Shock won the first round, the Titans evened up the map by winning the second, and the Shock took the third round. The Titans selected King's Row for map seven, and they were able to complete the map on their attack led by stellar play from SeoMinSoo on Zarya. Despite clutch plays from Grant "Moth" Espe on Lúcio, the Shock could not capture all three points on their attack. The loss tied the series up 3–3 as the match went to a finals seventh map. For the final map, the Shock selected Rialto. San Francisco completed the map with a solid time-bank remaining, but Vancouver responded by completing the map with the fastest time recorded ever in the Overwatch League. With both teams completing the map, the match went to overtime rounds. The Shock attacked first, but they were held just before they could cap the first checkpoint. With over four minutes remaining in their time bank, the Titans were able to push the payload further to hand San Francisco a 3–4 loss.

=== Stage 2 ===
Three days prior to their first match of Stage 2, Shock transferred DPS player Andrej "babybay" Francisty to Atlanta Reign. In their first match, Shock was led out to Blizzard Arena by NFL running back Marshawn Lynch to face Los Angeles Valiant; San Francisco rolled Los Angeles in the match, sweeping Valiant 4–0. Shock went on to sweep Guangzhou Charge in their second match of week one to post a perfect 8–0 map record for the week. Week two saw San Francisco face Guangzhou for the second time in a row; the result was the same, as Shock again swept Charge 4–0. Shock continued their dominance in week three, sweeping both Toronto Defiant and Hangzhou Spark. After their match against the Defiant, and before Hangzhou, San Francisco transferred flex support Nikola "sleepy" Andrews to Washington Justice. In the final week of the regular season of Stage 2, Shock continued their perfect stage by first defeating Philadelphia Fusion 4–0. San Francisco capped off the Stage 2 regular season by sweeping Shanghai Dragons; in the match, Shock set the record for map completion time on Paris twice – 1:57 on their first attempt and 1:36 on their second attempt. With the sweep, Shock completed the "perfect stage" with a 28–0 map record.

The top-seeded San Francisco Shock faced Shanghai Dragons, who they had just defeated in the last week of Stage 2, in the Stage 2 Quarterfinals. While Shanghai was able to win the first map of the match, ending San Francisco's map win streak, Shock took three maps in a row to move on to the Semifinals against Hangzhou Spark. In the Semifinals match, Shock did not allow Spark to cap a single point in the first three maps. Hangzhou was able to push the fourth map to overtime, but Shock took the map to sweep Spark.

The Stage 2 Finals were a rematch of the Stage 1 finals, with San Francisco Shock taking on Vancouver Titans. Shock came out with a quick lead, taking both points of the first map Lijiang Tower, but Vancouver quickly turned the tables, winning the second and third maps to go up 2–1 in the match. However, Shock was able to take three maps in a row to win the match 4–2, ending Vancouver's 19-match win streak, and were crowned Stage 2 Champions.

=== Stage 3 ===
The Shock opened Stage 3 with a match against the Atlanta Reign on June 6. While the Reign were able to take the first map, which snapped Shock's OWL record regular season 28-map win streak, and build that to a 2–1 lead heading into the fourth map, the Shock rallied back and won the following to maps to claim a 3–2 victory. The following week, the team took on the Houston Outlaws. Like their match against Atlanta a week prior, the game went to a fifth tiebreaker map; however, unlike their last game, San Francisco was unable to pull out a victory, losing 2–3. The loss snapped San Francisco's eleven-game winning streak. The Shock rebounded three days later by sweeping the Seoul Dynasty 4–0. For their first match of week three, San Francisco faced the Boston Uprising on June 20. San Francisco took advantage of the poor Sombra play from Uprising's Richard "rCk" Kanerva and uncoordinated play from their support line to sweep Boston 4–0. San Francisco continued to roll, sweeping the Florida Mayhem 4–0 the following day. For the final week of the stage, San Francisco first took on the Chengdu Hunters on June 27. The match went to a fifth tiebreaker map, but the Shock were unable to pull out a victory, losing 2–3. Their final match of the stage was three days later, against the London Spitfire; the Shock picked up another 4–0 sweep – their fourth of the stage. With a 5–2 record for Stage 3, the Shock claimed the fourth seed in the Stage 3 Playoffs.

For their quarterfinals match, the Shock took on the fifth-seeded Seoul Dynasty on July 12. The match opened on Oasis; the match was close, but the Dynasty came out with the map victory. San Francisco took the match to Numbani for map two. With a clean and methodological approach to their attack and their defense, the Shock managed to take the win in another close map. Seoul selected Volskaya Industries for map three, but the Shock secured a map victory after the map went to overtime rounds. Dorado, the fifth map, was again completed by both teams on their respective attacks, but again, the Shock emerged victorious. The 4–1 match win advanced the Shock to the semifinals. San Francisco faced the Los Angeles Valiant in the semifinals the following day. After winning the first map, Oasis, the Valiant selected Eichenwalde for map two. The Shock were able to complete the map on their attack, while preventing the Valiant from doing the same. Coming out of the match break up 2–0, the Shock kept their momentum going, winning on the following two maps to sweep Los Angeles 4–0.

With the win over the Dynasty, the Shock made it to their third consecutive stage finals, where they took on the Shanghai Dragons on July 14. The match opened on Oasis, where the Shock opted to play with substitute DPS players STRIKER and Architect and main tank Smurf. The substitution did not pay off, as the Shock dropped the first map. For map two, San Francisco selected Numbani and substituted back in main tank Super and DPS players sinatraa and Rascal. The Dragons completed the map in record time on their attack, while the Shock could not reach the final checkpoint. Down 0–2 going coming out of a match break, the Shock sent the match to Horizon Lunar Colony. Both teams were able to complete the map on their respective attacks, but a dominant performance by Shanghai's DPS Yang "DDing" Jin-hyeok on Pharah helped the Dragons to claim their third map of the series. For the fourth map, the match was sent to Havana; San Francisco failed to complete the map on their attack, but the team put on a clinic on defense, not allowing Shanghai to reach the first checkpoint, and took their first map of the series. The Dragons chose Ilios for the next map, and after a back-and-forth battle, the Shock came out victorious to close the gap to 2–3. The Dragons sent the match to Eichenwalde; after both teams completed the map, the Shock took the match in overtime rounds to even up the series 3–3. For what would be the final map of the match, the Dragons chose Dorado. The Shock attacked first, but they could only reach the first checkpoint before being held by a solid Dragon defense. The Dragons came out in full force; Shanghai's DPS players DDing and Bae "Diem" Min-seong on Phara and Widowmaker put on a clinic of a performance to propel the team past the first checkpoint and further than the Shock's payload distance to hand the Shock a 3–4 loss.

=== Stage 4 ===
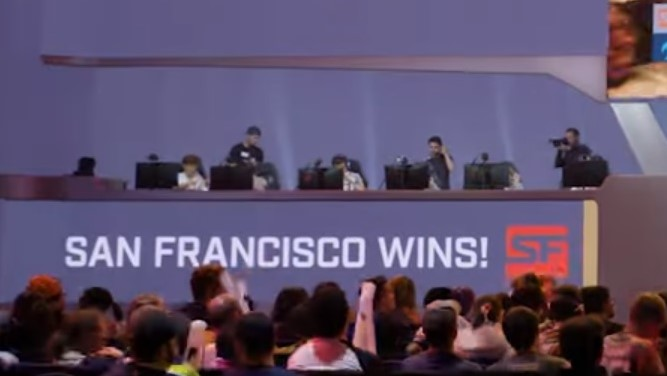
The Shock won every match they played in Stage 4.

The Shock's first match of Stage 4, along with the first match with an enforced 2-2-2 role lock by the League, was against the Seoul Dynasty on July 26. The Shock adapted to the new role lock by subbing in and out players depending on the map type and composition they wanted to run; the strategy proved to be successful, as they took down the Dynasty 3–1. The following week, the team took on the Los Angeles Gladiators. San Francisco found themselves down 1–2 going into map four, but they rallied back to tie up the series and bring the match to a fifth tiebreaker map. The Shock closed out the series with a map five win to take a 3–2 victory. The team's next match was against the Shanghai Dragons, who they had lost to in the Stage 3 Finals, on August 9. The Shock continued to effectively try out new rosters and won their "revenge match" by a score of 3–1. The team continued to roll, as two days later, they swept the Dallas Fuel 4–0. The following week, San Francisco took down the Chengdu Hunters 4–0. For their final week of play, the Shock headed to The Novo in Los Angeles to play in the Kit Kat Rivalry Weekend, hosted by the Los Angeles Valiant. The Shock's first match of the weekend was against the Vancouver Titans on August 24. It was the fourth meeting between the two teams in the 2019 season, and the Titans held a 2–1 head-to-head record over the Shock. After getting dismantled on Lijiang Tower, San Francisco evened up the match score by winning on Volskaya Industries. The two teams traded wins on maps three and four, pushing the match to a fifth tiebreaker match; the Shock dominated on map five to take a 3–2 match victory and even up the team's head-to-head record. For their final match of the regular season, the Shock took on the Los Angeles Valiant for the "California Cup" on August 25. The Shock closed out the regular season on a high note, as they picked up their sixteenth 4–0 sweep of the regular season. The win gave the team a 23–5 record – the second best in the league – and the third seed in the season playoffs.

== Playoffs ==
San Francisco opened the double-elimination season playoffs with a match against the sixth-seeded Atlanta Reign on September 6. The two teams traded blows throughout the entirety of the match, with Atlanta winning maps one, three, and five, and San Francisco winning maps two, four, and six. For the final map of the series, the Reign sent the match to Rialto, while the Shock opted to attack first. On their attack, the Shock managed to reach the first two checkpoints, but the Reign held them from completing the map as the cart stopped at the choke near the end of the map. On defense, San Francisco yielded the first two checkpoints to Atlanta. With about 30 seconds remaining on their attack and the payload only a few meters away from the Shock's distance pushed, the Reign engaged the Shock at the choke; Atlanta's DPS, and former Shock player, Andrej "babybay" Francisty eliminated San Francisco's main tank Yoo "smurf" Myeong-hwan, who was the only Shock player preventing the payload from advancing. With all of the other Shock players focused on other engagements, none of them were near the payload and the cart rolled forward far enough for Atlanta to take the map and hand the Shock a heartbreaking 3–4 loss.

The loss sent the Shock to the lower bracket, where they took on the seventh-seeded London Spitfire in the first round the following day. Despite London DPS Park "Profit" Joon-yeong putting on a stellar performance on Pharah throughout the match, the Shock were able to overcome everything London threw at them. Shock DPS Kwon "Striker" Nam-joo and main support Grant "Moth" Espe performed extremely well throughout the match to help the Shock rebound from their previous match and sweep the defending champions 4–0.

Advancing to the second round of the lower bracket, the Shock next faced the fifth-seeded Los Angeles Gladiators on September 12. San Francisco took advantage of a flat showing from the Gladiators on the first map, Busan, to take a quick 1–0 lead. From then on, the Gladiators put on a much better showing, showcasing great ultimate combinations between Chang-hoon "rOar" Gye on Orisa and Gui-un "Decay" Jang on Doomfist. While they were able to keep the battle competitive, the Shock proved to be too much to handle, as they took wins on King's Row and Horizon Lunar Colony. The Gladiators sent the match to Rialto for map four. On their attack, the Gladiators completed the map, largely due to a stellar performance by João Pedro "Hydration" Goes Telles on Pharah. However, the Shock responded by completing the map with one of the fastest times in the history of the OWL on their attack; San Francisco won the map in overtime rounds to pick up their second straight 4–0 sweep in the playoffs.

The team's next match was against the fourth-seeded Hangzhou Spark two days later. The match started on Busan, where the Spark started strong by winning the first round; however, the Shock surged backed on rounds two and three to go up 1–0 in the series. Looking to rebound, the Spark selected King's Row for map two. Both teams were able to complete the map on their respective attacks, but the Shock held the Spark from claiming a point in overtime rounds and won the map. Coming out of match break, the Spark sent the match to Temple of Anubis. Again, both teams completed the map on their first attempts; in overtime rounds, each team, again, completed the map, sending the map to a second overtime round. The Spark could not take a point on their third attempt, while the Shock capped the first point to take their third map win. In the fourth map, Dorado, each team, for the third consecutive map, completed the map on their first attacks. Once again in overtime rounds, the Spark managed to reach the first checkpoint, but they were held from reaching the second. The distance captured would prove not to be enough for Hangzhou, as the Shock pushed the payload further on their attack and secured another 4–0 sweep.

With the win, San Francisco advanced to the lower bracket finals, where they took on the Atlantic Division Champions New York Excelsior on September 15. The match opened on Lijiang Tower with both teams opting to run an Orisa/Sigma tank composition. Both teams took a point in the map, but the Shock won on the third round to win the first map. New York sent the match to King's Row for map two; the Shock completed the map on their attack, and on their defense, they put up a stellar defensive performance, shaving off chunks New York's time bank just past the first checkpoint. The Excelsior managed to reach the second checkpoint, but a last-minute switch to McCree by Jay “sinatraa” Won shut down the Excelsior offense and prevented them from completing the map. For map three, New York chose Temple of Anubus. Both teams completed the map twice, sending the match to a second overtime round. While they took the first point, New York could not finish the map on their third attempt, while San Francisco managed to capture enough progress on the second point to take their third map win. For what would be the final map, New York elected to send the match to Rialto. The Shock attacked first and completed the map with 3:21 remaining in their time bank. On defense, the Shock could not stop New York from reaching the first two checkpoints, but they held off the Excelsior from completing the map to claim their fourth straight 4–0 sweep in the playoffs. The win sent the Shock to the Grand Finals.

=== Grand Finals ===
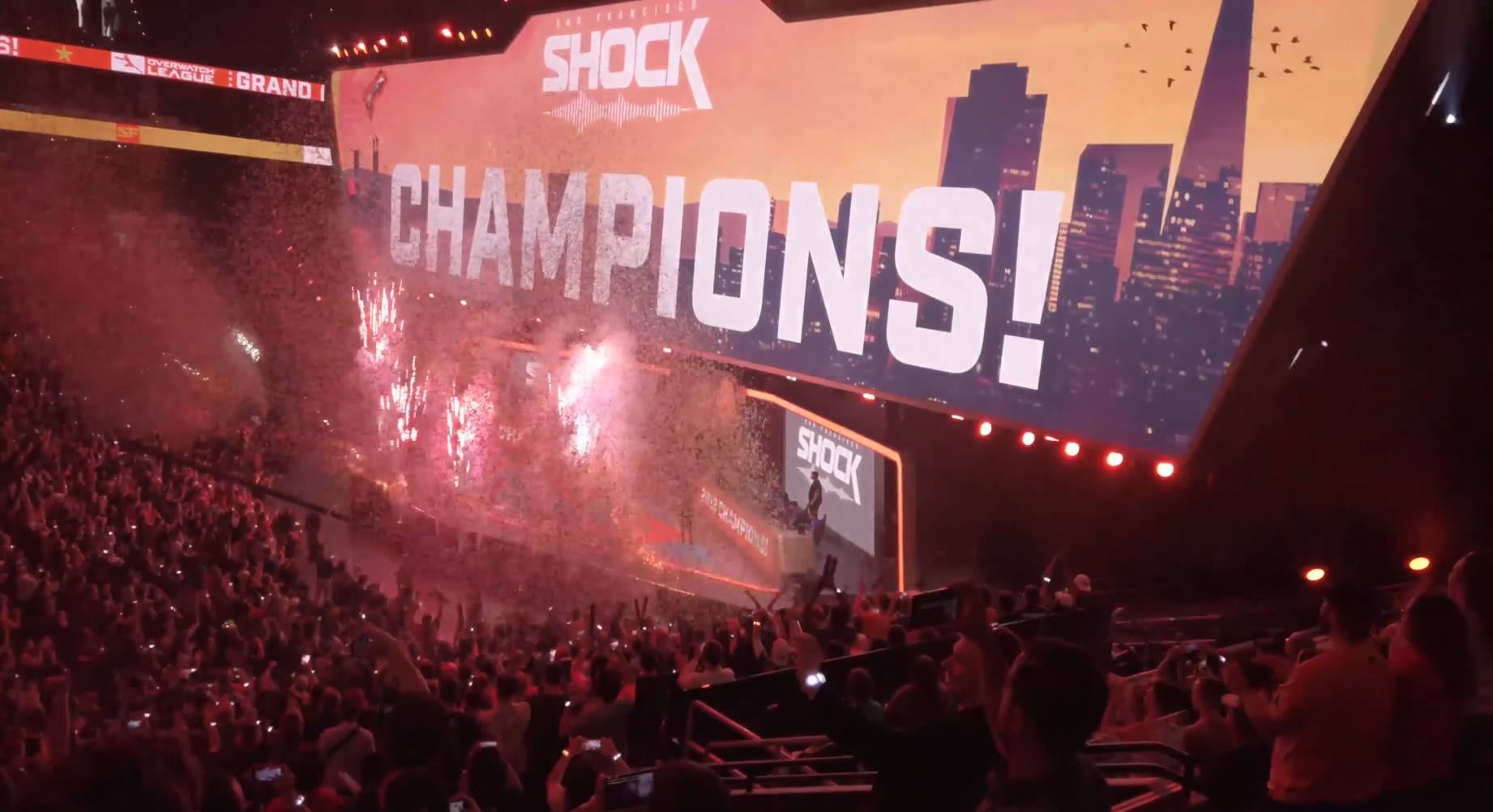
The Shock won the 2019 Grand Finals.

As the higher seed in the matchup, the Titans selected control map Lijiang Tower – a map that Vancouver has been historically good on – to open the match. The Shock came out strong and took the first point of the round. In round two, the Titans came out on top of the first team fight and took first control. The two teams traded point captures in round two, but a strong performance by Shock Jay "sinatraa" Won's on Doomfist sealed a map win for the Shock in the second round.

Vancouver selected Eichenwalde for map two. San Francisco attacked first and were able to capture the first point on their first attempt. As the map moved to the escort potion, the Shock did not lose a team fight as they captured the second point with over four minutes in the time bank. As the payload was escorted though the final phase of the map, Rascal used Mei's ice walls helping to both protect and elevate Architect's Bastion to give him high ground. Notably, Architect had managed to get Bastion up onto one of the chandeliers that hung near the end of the map and, subsequently, prevented the Titans from challenging the final capture from this tactical position. The Shock finished the map with 2:49 in the time bank. For their defense, the Shock opted to defend with Rascal on Pharah, while Architect remained on Bastion. The Titans responded well, and through a lengthy team fight, they were able to capture the first point and began escorting the payload. After Vancouver reached the second checkpoint, the Shock were able to stop the Titans in the first fight of the third phase, but the Titans came back in full force and finished the map with 2:47 in their time bank. As both teams completed the map, the map went to overtime rounds; Vancouver attacked first, but they were only able to capture about half of the first point. On San Francisco's attack, they were held up under the choke point for an extended amount of time, but the team was able to touch the capture area as time ran out to force an overtime timer; a clutch ultimate from Choi "ChoiHyoBin" Hyo-bin on Sigma led to the Shock closing out the map with a win.

Coming out of halftime, the Titan's chose assault map Temple of Anubis for the match's third map; the Shock brought sinatraa and Striker back in for Rascal and Architect. The Titans attacked first and were able to capture the first point on their first attempt. After a few failed attempts, the Titans finally broke through the Shock's second point defenses and, after a lengthy stagger delay from the Shock, finished the map with 1:34 remaining. On defense, the Titans focused on shutting down sinatraa's Doomfist, and found some success, as they were able to hold of the Shock's first and second attacks. However, the Shock finally broke through the Titan defense as the timer ran out and captured the first point in overtime. San Francisco carried that momentum into the second point and won the first team fight to finish the map with 2:12 in their time bank. The Titans had the first attack in overtime rounds; after getting shut down multiple times, Haksal's Doomfist created an opening for the Titans to take the first point with less than 15 second remaining. With only time for one more attack, the Titan's failed to capture the second point. The Shock responded on their attack by taking the first point on their first attempt. Striker found an early pick as the Shock attacked the second point, but Vancouver was able to recover and held back the Shock. San Francisco responded by taking down Vancouver in the next team fight and took their third map win.

With the Shock at match point, the Titans selected Watchpoint: Gibraltar for map four. Defending first, Vancouver overcame the Bastion/Mei composition run by San Francisco in the first team fight right at the beginning of the map; however, the Shock eventually broke through the Titan defense and went on to complete the map with 1:52 remaining. Vancouver struggled to push the payload to the first checkpoint on their attack, largely due to a stellar performance by Shock's DPS Rascal on Pharah. The Titans eventually broke through and pushed the payload past the second checkpoint. However, Vancouver could not find a footing in the final phase of the map. With Architect as Bastion on the high ground defending the final checkpoint of the map, the Shock held the Titans from completing the map and claimed a 4–0 sweep. The win crowned the San Francisco Shock as Overwatch League Champions.

== Final roster ==
2019 San Francisco Shock roster
Players
Coaches

Role	No.	Handle	Name	Nationality
Damage	2	sinatraa	Won, Jay	United States
Damage	3	Architect	Park Min-ho	South Korea
Damage	7	Striker	Kwon Nam-joo	South Korea
Damage	27	Rascal	Kim Dong-jun	South Korea
Tank	1	super	DeLisi, Matthew	United States
Tank	5	smurf	Yoo Myeong-hwan	South Korea
Tank	9	Nevix	Karlsson, Andreas	Sweden
Tank	11	ChoiHyoBin	Choi Hyo-bin	South Korea
Support	17	Viol2t	Park Min-ki	South Korea
Support	64	Moth	Espe, Grant	United States

Head coach

- Park Dae-hee

Legend:
- (I) Inactive
- (S) Suspended
- (2W) Two-way player
- Substitute
- (injured) Injury / Illness

Latest roster transaction: April 19, 2019.

=== Transactions ===
Transactions of/for players on the roster during the 2019 regular season:

- On April 2, Shock transferred Andrej "Babybay" Francisty to Atlanta Reign.
- On April 19, Shock transferred Nikola "Sleepy" Andrews to Washington Justice.

== Standings ==
=== Record by stage ===
Stage	Pld	W	L	Pct	MW	ML	MT	MD	Pos
1	7	4	3	.571	17	12	0	+5	6
2	7	7	0	1.000	28	0	0	+28	1
3	7	5	2	.714	23	8	0	+15	4
4 (Note: No stage playoffs were held for Stage 4.)	7	7	0	1.000	24	6	0	+18	2
Overall	28	23	5	.821	92	26	0	+66	3
Qualified for playoffs • Qualified for play-in tournament

=== League ===
Pos	Div	Team	Pld	W	L	PCT	MW	ML	MT	MD	Qualification
1	PAC	Vancouver Titans	28	25	3	0.893	89	28	0	+61	Advance to season playoffs (division leaders)
2	ATL	New York Excelsior	28	22	6	0.786	78	38	3	+40	Advance to season playoffs (division leaders)
3	PAC	San Francisco Shock	28	23	5	0.821	92	26	0	+66	Advance to season playoffs
4	PAC	Hangzhou Spark	28	18	10	0.643	64	52	4	+12	Advance to season playoffs
5	PAC	Los Angeles Gladiators	28	17	11	0.607	67	48	3	+19	Advance to season playoffs
6	ATL	Atlanta Reign	28	16	12	0.571	69	50	1	+19	Advance to season playoffs
7	ATL	London Spitfire	28	16	12	0.571	58	52	6	+6	Advance to play-ins
8	PAC	Seoul Dynasty	28	15	13	0.536	64	50	3	+14	Advance to play-ins
9	PAC	Guangzhou Charge	28	15	13	0.536	61	57	1	+4	Advance to play-ins
10	ATL	Philadelphia Fusion	28	15	13	0.536	57	60	3	−3	Advance to play-ins
11	PAC	Shanghai Dragons	28	13	15	0.464	51	61	3	−10	Advance to play-ins
12	PAC	Chengdu Hunters	28	13	15	0.464	55	66	1	−11	Advance to play-ins
13	PAC	Los Angeles Valiant	28	12	16	0.429	56	61	4	−5	
14	ATL	Paris Eternal	28	11	17	0.393	46	67	3	−21	
15	PAC	Dallas Fuel	28	10	18	0.357	43	70	3	−27	
16	ATL	Houston Outlaws	28	9	19	0.321	47	69	3	−22	
17	ATL	Toronto Defiant	28	8	20	0.286	39	72	4	−33	
18	ATL	Washington Justice	28	8	20	0.286	39	72	6	−33	
19	ATL	Boston Uprising	28	8	20	0.286	41	78	2	−37	
20	ATL	Florida Mayhem	28	6	22	0.214	36	75	5	−39	

Source: The Overwatch League
Rules for classification: 1) winning percentage; 2) map differential; 3) head-to-head record; 4) head-to-head map differential

== Game log ==
=== Regular season ===
2019 game log (Regular season record: 23–5)
Stage 1 (4–3)

1	February 15	Dallas Fuel	0	–	4	San Francisco Shock	Burbank, CA
		Recap					Blizzard Arena
		0	Nepal			2	
		1	King's Row			3	
		2	Horizon Lunar Colony			3	
		1	Rialto			3	

2	February 17	San Francisco Shock	2	–	3	Los Angeles Gladiators	Burbank, CA
		Recap					Blizzard Arena
		2	Ilios			1	
		1	Hollywood			3	
		2	Horizon Lunar Colony			3	
		4	Rialto			3	
		1	Busan			2	

3	February 24	Vancouver Titans	3	–	1	San Francisco Shock	Burbank, CA
		Recap					Blizzard Arena
		2	Busan			0	
		5	King's Row			4	
		2	Volskaya Industries			1	
		4	Route 66			5	

4	February 28	San Francisco Shock	3	–	1	Hangzhou Spark	Burbank, CA
		Recap					Blizzard Arena
		1	Ilios			2	
		1	Hollywood			0	
		4	Temple of Anubis			2	
		3	Route 66			0	

5	March 02	San Francisco Shock	4	–	0	Washington Justice	Burbank, CA
		Recap					Blizzard Arena
		2	Nepal			1	
		3	Numbani			2	
		2	Temple of Anubis			0	
		3	Route 66			1	

6	March 08	New York Excelsior	4	–	0	San Francisco Shock	Burbank, CA
		Recap					Blizzard Arena
		2	Busan			1	
		5	Numbani			4	
		6	Volskaya Industries			5	
		2	Dorado			1	

7	March 10	Paris Eternal	1	–	3	San Francisco Shock	Burbank, CA
		Recap					Blizzard Arena
		0	Nepal			2	
		1	Hollywood			3	
		2	Horizon Lunar Colony			3	
		2	Dorado			0	

Stage 2 (7–0)

8	April 05	Los Angeles Valiant	0	–	4	San Francisco Shock	Burbank, CA
	7:30 pm PST	Recap					Blizzard Arena
		0	Busan			2	
		2	Temple of Anubis			3	
		1	Blizzard World			2	
		0	Watchpoint: Gibraltar			1	

9	April 07	San Francisco Shock	4	–	0	Guangzhou Charge	Burbank, CA
	12:00 noon PST	Recap					Blizzard Arena
		2	Busan			0	
		4	Temple of Anubis			3	
		3	Eichenwalde			2	
		3	Junkertown			0	

10	April 12	Guangzhou Charge	0	–	4	San Francisco Shock	Burbank, CA
	7:00 pm PST	Recap					Blizzard Arena
		0	Oasis			2	
		2	Paris			3	
		0	Blizzard World			3	
		0	Watchpoint: Gibraltar			3	

11	April 18	San Francisco Shock	4	–	0	Toronto Defiant	Burbank, CA
	5:30 pm PST	Recap					Blizzard Arena
		2	Lijiang Tower			0	
		2	Hanamura			1	
		2	Eichenwalde			1	
		3	Watchpoint: Gibraltar			0	

12	April 21	Hangzhou Spark	0	–	4	San Francisco Shock	Burbank, CA
	3:00 pm PST	Recap					Blizzard Arena
		1	Lijiang Tower			2	
		4	Paris			5	
		0	Eichenwalde			3	
		1	Rialto			3	

13	May 02	Philadelphia Fusion	0	–	4	San Francisco Shock	Burbank, CA
	7:00 pm PST	Recap					Blizzard Arena
		1	Oasis			2	
		1	Hanamura			2	
		1	King's Row			3	
		0	Junkertown			3	

14	May 05	Shanghai Dragons	0	–	4	San Francisco Shock	Burbank, CA
	3:00 pm PST	Recap					Blizzard Arena
		1	Oasis			2	
		4	Paris			5	
		4	King's Row			5	
		4	Rialto			5	

Stage 3 (5–2)

15	June 06	San Francisco Shock	3	–	2	Atlanta Reign	Burbank, CA
	4:00 pm PST	Details					Blizzard Arena
		1	Ilios			2	
		1	Paris			0	
		1	Hollywood			2	
		5	Watchpoint: Gibraltar			4	
		2	Oasis			0	

16	June 13	Houston Outlaws	3	–	2	San Francisco Shock	Burbank, CA
	4:00 pm PST	Details					Blizzard Arena
		2	Nepal			1	
		0	Horizon Lunar Colony			1	
		0	Eichenwalde			3	
		1	Havana			0	
		2	Ilios			0	

17	June 16	San Francisco Shock	4	–	0	Seoul Dynasty	Burbank, CA
	12:00 noon PST	Details					Blizzard Arena
		2	Nepal			1	
		2	Volskaya Industries			0	
		4	Numbani			3	
		2	Havana			1	

18	June 20	San Francisco Shock	4	–	0	Boston Uprising	Burbank, CA
	4:00 pm PST	Details					Blizzard Arena
		2	Oasis			0	
		3	Paris			2	
		2	Hollywood			1	
		1	Dorado			0	

19	June 21	San Francisco Shock	4	–	0	Florida Mayhem	Burbank, CA
	5:45 pm PST	Details					Blizzard Arena
		2	Nepal			0	
		3	Volskaya Industries			2	
		5	Numbani			4	
		3	Watchpoint: Gibraltar			0	

20	June 27	San Francisco Shock	2	–	3	Chengdu Hunters	Burbank, CA
	9:00 pm PST	Details					Blizzard Arena
		1	Ilios			2	
		4	Volskaya Industries			3	
		4	Eichenwalde			5	
		2	Dorado			0	
		1	Oasis			2	

21	June 30	London Spitfire	0	–	4	San Francisco Shock	Burbank, CA
	1:45 pm PST	Details					Blizzard Arena
		0	Oasis			2	
		5	Horizon Lunar Colony			6	
		0	Numbani			1	
		4	Havana			5	

Stage 4 (7–0)

22	July 26	Seoul Dynasty	1	–	3	San Francisco Shock	Burbank, CA
	7:30 pm PST	Details					Blizzard Arena
		2	Busan			0	
		0	Temple of Anubis			1	
		2	Hollywood			3	
		1	Havana			3	

23	August 03	Los Angeles Gladiators	2	–	3	San Francisco Shock	Burbank, CA
	5:15 pm PST	Details					Blizzard Arena
		2	Ilios			0	
		0	Hanamura			1	
		6	King's Row			5	
		2	Havana			3	
		0	Lijiang Tower			2	

24	August 09	San Francisco Shock	3	–	1	Shanghai Dragons	Burbank, CA
	7:30 pm PST	Details					Blizzard Arena
		2	Busan			1	
		4	Volskaya Industries			3	
		1	Blizzard World			2	
		3	Route 66			1	

25	August 11	San Francisco Shock	4	–	0	Dallas Fuel	Burbank, CA
	3:30 pm PST	Details					Blizzard Arena
		2	Ilios			0	
		2	Temple of Anubis			0	
		3	Blizzard World			2	
		3	Junkertown			1	

26	August 16	Chengdu Hunters	0	–	4	San Francisco Shock	Burbank, CA
	5:45 pm PST	Details					Blizzard Arena
		0	Ilios			2	
		1	Hanamura			2	
		0	Hollywood			1	
		1	Route 66			2	

27	August 24	San Francisco Shock	3	–	2	Vancouver Titans	Los Angeles, CA
	5:30 pm PST	Details					The Novo
		0	Lijiang Tower			2	
		4	Volskaya Industries			2	
		4	King's Row			5	
		3	Havana			1	
		2	Busan			0	

28	August 25	San Francisco Shock	4	–	0	Los Angeles Valiant	Los Angeles, CA
	5:15 pm PST	Details					The Novo
		2	Lijiang Tower			0	
		2	Volskaya Industries			1	
		3	Blizzard World			2	
		2	Junkertown			1	

=== Playoffs ===
2019 playoff game log
Stage 1 Playoffs (2–1)

Quarterfinals	March 22	San Francisco Shock	3	–	0	Toronto Defiant	Burbank, CA
	8:00 pm PST	Recap					Blizzard Arena
		2	Busan			1	
		3	King's Row			0	
		3	Horizon Lunar Colony			2	

Semifinals	March 23	San Francisco Shock	4	–	0	Philadelphia Fusion	Burbank, CA
	3:00 pm PST	Recap					Blizzard Arena
		2	Ilios			0	
		3	Hollywood			0	
		4	Horizon Lunar Colony			2	
		3	Rialto			0	

Finals	March 24	San Francisco Shock	3	–	4	Vancouver Titans	Burbank, CA
	12:00 noon PST	Recap					Blizzard Arena
		2	Nepal			1	
		0	Numbani			1	
		4	Temple of Anubis			3	
		1	Dorado			2	
		2	Ilios			1	
		2	King's Row			3	
		3	Rialto			4	

Stage 2 Playoffs (3–0)

Quarterfinals	May 09	Shanghai Dragons	1	–	3	San Francisco Shock	Burbank, CA
	6:00 pm PST	Recap					Blizzard Arena
		2	Oasis			1	
		2	Eichenwalde			3	
		2	Paris			4	
		1	Rialto			3	

Semifinals	May 11	Hangzhou Spark	0	–	4	San Francisco Shock	Burbank, CA
	12:00 noon PST	Details					Blizzard Arena
		0	Busan			2	
		0	Blizzard World			3	
		0	Hanamura			1	
		3	Watchpoint: Gibraltar			4	

Finals	May 12	Vancouver Titans	2	–	4	San Francisco Shock	Burbank, CA
	10:00 am PST	Details					Blizzard Arena
		0	Lijang Tower			2	
		5	King's Row			4	
		1	Paris			0	
		3	Watchpoint: Gibraltar			4	
		0	Oasis			2	
		1	Blizzard World			3	

Stage 3 Playoffs (2–1)

Quarterfinals	July 12	Seoul Dynasty	1	–	3	San Francisco Shock	Burbank, CA
	6:00 pm PST	Details					Blizzard Arena
		2	Oasis			1	
		2	Numbani			3	
		2	Volskaya Industries			3	
		3	Dorado			4	

Semifinals	July 13	Los Angeles Valiant	0	–	4	San Francisco Shock	Burbank, CA
	11:00 pm PST	Details					Blizzard Arena
		0	Oasis			2	
		2	Eichenwalde			3	
		1	Volskaya Industries			2	
		0	Havana			3	

Finals	July 14	Shanghai Dragons	4	–	3	San Francisco Shock	Burbank, CA
	1:00 pm PST	Details					Blizzard Arena
		2	Oasis			1	
		3	Numbani			2	
		4	Horizon Lunar Colony			3	
		0	Havana			2	
		1	Ilios			2	
		3	Eichenwalde			4	
		2	Dorado			1	

Season Playoffs (5–1)

First round	September 6	Atlanta Reign	4	–	3	San Francisco Shock	Burbank, CA
	7:00 pm PST	Details					Blizzard Arena
		2	Busan			1	
		0	Numbani			3	
		1	Horizon Lunar Colony			0	
		2	Watchpoint: Gibraltar			3	
		2	Lijiang Tower			0	
		5	King's Row			6	
		6	Rialto			5	

Losers Round 1	September 7	London Spitfire	0	–	4	San Francisco Shock	Burbank, CA
	9:00 pm PST	Details					Blizzard Arena
		1	Busan			2	
		2	Numbani			3	
		1	Horizon Lunar Colony			2	
		1	Watchpoint: Gibraltar			2	

Losers Round 2	September 12	Los Angeles Gladiators	0	–	4	San Francisco Shock	Burbank, CA
	7:00 pm PST	Details					Blizzard Arena
		0	Busan			2	
		2	King's Row			3	
		2	Horizon Lunar Colony			3	
		3	Rialto			4	

Losers Round 3	September 14	Hangzhou Spark	0	–	4	San Francisco Shock	Burbank, CA
	12:00 noon PST	Details					Blizzard Arena
		1	Busan			2	
		3	King's Row			4	
		4	Temple of Anubis			5	
		4	Dorado			5	

Losers Round 4	September 15	San Francisco Shock	4	–	0	New York Excelsior	Burbank, CA
	12:00 noon PST	Details					Blizzard Arena
		2	Lijiang Tower			1	
		3	King's Row			2	
		6	Temple of Anubis			5	
		3	Rialto			2	

Grand Finals	September 29	San Francisco Shock	4	–	0	Vancouver Titans	Philadelphia, PA
	3:00 pm EDT	Details					Wells Fargo Center
		2	Lijiang Tower			0	
		4	Eichenwalde			3	
		4	Temple of Anubis			3	
		3	Watchpoint: Gibraltar			2	

== Awards ==
Jay "Sinatraa" Won, Matthew "Super" DeLisi, Choi "ChoiHyoBin" Hyo-bin, and Grant "Moth" Espe were awarded the Role Star commendation for DPS, tank, tank, and support, respectively. Both Sinatraa and Super were nominated for the league's most valuable player award, which Sinatraa won for his ability to flex onto a multitude of different heroes and hold his own as a championship team member.
