= Zaria (disambiguation) =

Zaria is a city in Kaduna State, Nigeria.

Zaria may also refer to:

- Zaria (goddess), or Zoria, the Slavic goddess of beauty
- Zaria, a genus of gastropods in the family Turritellidae

== People ==
- Zaria (wrestler), Australian professional wrestler
- Countess Zaria of Orange-Nassau, Jonkvrouwe van Amsberg (born 2006), member of the Dutch royal family

== See also ==
- Zarya (disambiguation)
- Zorya (disambiguation)
  - Zorya, two goddesses in Slavic mythology
- Zoria (disambiguation)
- Zaira (disambiguation)
