= Zoria =

Zoria may refer to:

== Ukraine ==
- Afiny, a village in Ukraine, previously known as Zoria
- Rannia Zoria, a village in Ukraine
- Komysh-Zoria, a rural settlement in Ukraine
- FC Zoria Khorostkiv, a Ukrainian football club
- Valeriia Zoria (born 1987), Ukrainian handball player

== Other ==
- Zoria: Age of Shattering, a video game
- Zoria, a character in the television series Dragon Hunters
- Zoria, a locality in Manitoba, Canada, see List of Canadian place names of Ukrainian origin

== See also ==
- Zorya (disambiguation)
- Zaria (disambiguation)
- Zarya (disambiguation)
