= Zaira =

Zaira may refer to:

== People ==
- Zaira Bas (born 1994), Spanish beauty queen
- Zaira Cosico, Filipino ballerina
- Zaira Nara (born 1988), Argentine model
- Zaira Ollano (1904–1997), Italian physicist
- Zaira Wasim (born 2000), Indian Bollywood actress

== Other uses ==
- Zaira (fly), a parasitic fly
- Zaira (opera), an Italian opera based on Voltaire's play Zaïre
- Zaira, a small town on Vangunu, Solomon Islands

== See also ==
- Zaire (disambiguation)
- Zara (disambiguation)
- Zaria (disambiguation)
