= Sinatraa =

Competitive video game player (born 2000)

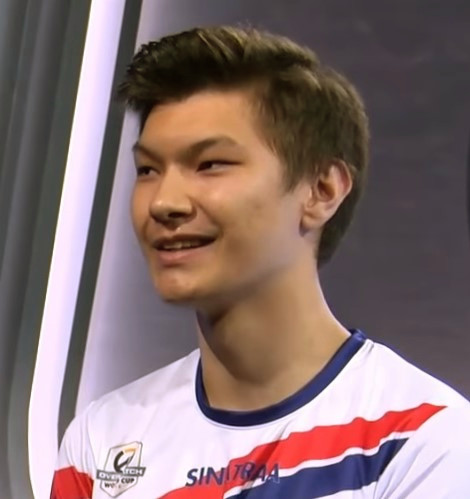

Personal information
- Name: Jay Won
- Born: March 18, 2000 (age 26); Shoreline, Washington, U.S.

Career information
- Games: Overwatch; Valorant
- Playing career: 2016–2021, 2023, 2025

Team history
- Overwatch
- 2016–2017: Selfless Gaming
- 2018–2020: San Francisco Shock
- Valorant
- 2020–2021: Sentinels
- 2023: Untamable Beasts
- 2025: Envy (substitute)

Career highlights and awards
- OWL champion (2019); OWL Most Valuable Player (2019); OWL All-Star (2019); OWL Role Star (2019); OWWC champion (2019); OWWC Most Valuable Player (2019)

Twitch information
- Channel: sinatraa
- Years active: 2016–present
- Followers: 2 million
- Last updated: Feb 3, 2025

Jay Won (born March 18, 2000), professionally known as Sinatraa, is an American esports player and content creator. Won began his career as a player in the game Overwatch. He initially competed for Selfless Gaming and later joined the San Francisco Shock team prior to the Overwatch League's inaugural season in 2018. In the 2019 season, Won's performances led to him being awarded the Most Valuable Player and won the 2019 Overwatch League Grand Finals. Won also represented Team USA in the Overwatch World Cup from 2017 to 2019. In the 2019 Overwatch World Cup, Won helped the team to claim the championship title. Due to his performance throughout the tournament, Won received the Most Valuable Player award.

In April 2020, Won made a transition to the emerging competitive scene of Valorant, signing with the Sentinels. However, he faced suspension in March 2021 following allegations of sexual abuse. Following, Won continued to stay involved in the gaming industry as a content creator.

== Overwatch career ==
=== Professional career ===
After achieving rankings of second in North America and fifth in the world on Overwatch's competitive mode, Won received an opportunity to try out for Selfless Gaming, an esports team based in Georgia, United States. Although he initially did not secure a spot on the team, he was given another chance a few weeks later. Following a review of his performance by head coach and co-owner Brad Rajani, he was ultimately signed to the team. However, Selfless Gaming disbanded on July 7, 2017, leading to the conclusion of Won's association with the team.

With the inception of the Overwatch League approaching in 2018, scouts from the twelve franchises sought to sign players to complete their teams. Won attracted significant attention and sparked a bidding war between NRG Esports and Cloud9. Initially inclined to join the London Spitfire, Cloud9's Overwatch team, Won eventually reconsidered his decision after further discussions with NRG and his parents. He opted to sign a contract worth US$150,000 per year with NRG's San Francisco Shock, three times the league's minimum salary, forging a reunion with head coach Rajani, who became the head coach of the Shock. Due to being 17 years old at the time, Won was ineligible to participate in league matches until he reached the age of 18. He made his Overwatch League debut on March 21, 2018, against the Florida Mayhem. Despite a loss in that match with a score of 2–3, Won quickly demonstrated his skills and solidified his status as one of the league's premier damage players. As he and his teammate Matthew "super" DeLisi became eligible to compete around the same time, the team achieved an 11–9 record in the latter half of the season 3.

In the 2019 season of the Overwatch League, teams primarily utilized compositions consisting of three tanks and three supports during the first three quarters of the season. During this time, Won, who typically played as the damage hero Tracer, made a transition to playing as the tank hero Zarya. The San Francisco Shock, with Won's contributions, achieved impressive results, posting a perfect +28 map differential in Stage 2, reaching all three stage finals, and securing one stage title. In July 2019, just before the final stage of the season, the league introduced a role lock system, requiring teams to adhere to a composition of two tanks, two supports, and two damage players. Following this change, Won primarily played as the damage hero Doomfist. He concluded the season as the leader in hero damage dealt per 10 minutes and played a crucial role in helping the team achieve a regular season record of 23–5. Won received recognition as a Role Star for DPS and received the Overwatch League Most Valuable Player award. After a loss to the Atlanta Reign in the first round of the 2019 season playoffs, the San Francisco Shock made their way through the lower bracket to secure a spot in the 2019 Grand Finals. In the Grand Finals against the Vancouver Titans on September 29, 2019, Won played in two out of the four maps as the Shock clinched a 4–0 victory and emerged as the champions. Following this Grand Finals win, Won and his San Francisco Shock teammate, Matthew "super" Delisi, appeared on The Tonight Show Starring Jimmy Fallon on October 7, 2019 to talk about their victory.

Won announced his retirement from professional Overwatch on April 28, 2020, citing a "lost passion for the game". In recognition of his MVP award, the Overwatch League released a commemorative in-game skin for the hero Zarya on June 16, 2020. However, in March 2021, following sexual assault allegations that emerged, the Overwatch League offered refunds for the skin and removed the OWL Championship and MVP badges from the skin.

=== National team career ===
Won was selected as a member of Team USA in the 2017 Overwatch World Cup (OWWC). Although the team faced defeat against Team South Korea in the quarterfinals, Won's performance throughout the World Cup caught the attention of NRG Esports CEO Andy Miller, ultimately leading to his signing there. Won was once again selected to represent Team USA in the 2018 Overwatch World Cup. Despite securing the top seed after the group stage, the team experienced a loss in the quarterfinals against Team United Kingdom.

In the 2019 Overwatch World Cup, Won once again selected to represent Team USA, marking his third consecutive year participating in the tournament. Joining forces with his San Francisco Shock teammates Matthew "super" Delisi and Grant "moth" Espe, Team USA showcased their prowess as they navigated through the competition, emerging victorious in every match they played. The team's performance culminated in a sweeping victory against Team China in the OWWC finals on November 2, 2019, securing USA's first OWWC title. Won's contributions earned him the title of OWWC Most Valuable Player. Alongside super and moth, he became one of the four few individuals to have won both Overwatch League and Overwatch World Cup titles.

== Valorant career ==
In April 2020, Won joined the Sentinels Valorant team, marking his transition into the game after retiring from professional Overwatch. Within a few months, he established himself as one of the top players in the Valorant scene. In the PAX Arena Invitational finals, a North American tournament, Won led all players in assists at 122 and ranked fourth in kills-per-round at 0.90. Sentinels emerged victorious in the final of the tournament on July 26, 2020, defeating Cloud9. Won continued his winning streak by securing another tournament victory on August 2, as Sentinels triumphed over Team SoloMid at the 30Bomb Summer Cup final. During the Pop Flash tournament, the fourth and final North American Ignition Series event, Won delivered an outstanding performance in the group stage against Immortals, earning 402 Average Combat Score, 32 kills, and 11 first bloods. Sentinels secured the tournament title by defeating Team Envy 3–0 in the grand final on August 30. At this point in his career, Won had recorded over 700 assists in professional play, making him the only player worldwide to surpass the 600-assist mark. Won went on to achieve two more tournament victories with Sentinels, winning the JBL Quantum Cup in December 2020 and the Valorant Champions Tour North America Challengers One in February 2021.

Following sexual assault allegations against Won in March 2021, he was suspended by Riot Games while they conducted their investigation into the matter. The Sentinels organization also suspended Won until their internal investigation was completed. On May 17, 2021, Riot Games announced a competitive ruling stating that Won would remain suspended for a total of six months, with the suspension period ending on September 10, due to his alleged failure to fully cooperate with the investigation. As a result of the suspension, Sentinels acquired Tyson "TenZ" Ngo to replace Won in the starting roster.

In April 2022, Won announced his intention to return to the Valorant competitive scene. However, he did not secure a team signing after the announcement and continued his work as a content creator. In January 2023, Won joined the free agent team Untamable Beasts, which participated in the Valorant Challengers North America open qualifier, ultimately failing to qualify.

In December 2025 Won was taken as a substitute for Envy replacing Ayan "ion2x" Rastogi for the "For Those Who Dare 2025" tournament, winning the tournament with the team

== Personal life ==
Won was born on March 18, 2000, in Shoreline, Washington. He developed a love for video games from a young age, particularly first-person shooters like Halo 3, Call of Duty and Counter-Strike. In 2014, he won his first cash prize in esports, earning $200 in a Counter-Strike tournament. In high school, he was set to play varsity as the starting second baseman for their baseball team, but he dropped out of traditional high school to pursue a career in esports. As an online name, Won chose "Sinatraa", which was inspired by Logic's mixtape Young Sinatra: Welcome to Forever, with an added "a" since "Sinatra" was already taken.

In August 2018, he threw the first pitch at an Oakland A's game.

In March 2021, Won's ex-girlfriend accused him of sexual assault, which he denied. On April 12, 2022, Dot Esports reported that a police investigation followed, but no advancement was made in the investigation.

Awards and achievements
| Preceded by Bang "JJonak" Sung-hyeon | Overwatch League MVP; 2019 | Succeeded by Kim "Fleta" Byung-sun |
| Preceded by Bang "JJonak" Sung-hyeon | Overwatch World Cup MVP; 2019 | Succeeded by Incumbent |
