= 2019 Seoul Dynasty season =

- Head coach: Kim Dong-gun
- General manager: Lee Ho-cheol
- Owner: Kevin Chou
- Division: Pacific

Results
- Record: 15–13 (.536)
- Place: Pacific: 5th; League: 8th
- Stage 1 Playoffs: Semifinals
- Stage 2 Playoffs: Did not qualify
- Stage 3 Playoffs: Quarterfinals
- Season Playoffs: Lower Round 1
- Total Earnings: $275,000

The 2019 Seoul Dynasty season was the second season of the Seoul Dynasty's existence in the Overwatch League and is the team's first under head coach Kim "KDG" Dong-gun. The team looked to improve on their 2018 season, when they posted a 22–18 record and missed out on the season playoffs.

A 3–0 victory over the London Spitfire in the final match of Stage 1 gave the team a 4–3 record and qualified them Stage 1 Playoffs. Seoul took down the New York Excelsior 3–1 in the quarterfinals, but they were eliminated after losing to the Vancouver Titans, 0–4, in the semifinals. The Dynasty struggles in Stage 2, as they were only able to amass a 3–4 record. After the All-Star break, Seoul hit their stride. The team opened Stage 3 with three straight 4–0 sweeps over their opponents, leading to a 5–2 Stage 3 record. Qualified as the fifth seed in the Stage 3 Playoffs, the team fell to the San Francisco Shock 1–3 in the quarterfinals. Seoul struggled in Stage 4, which included the implementation of an enforced 2-2-2 role lock; a 1–3 loss to the Philadelphia Fusion in the final match of the regular season took the team out of the top six in regular season standings.

In eighth place in the regular season standing, Seoul had to compete in the Play-In Tournament in order to make it to the season playoffs. After defeating the Guangzhou Charge 3–1 in the tournament, the Dynasty claimed the final spot in the season playoffs. Their playoff run opened with a 2–4 loss to the Vancouver Titans on September 5, sending the Dynasty to the lower bracket of the tournament. Seoul's season ended in the first round of the lower bracket, as they fell 1–4 to the Hangzhou Spark.

== Preceding offseason ==
=== Player re-signings ===
From August 1 to September 9, 2018, all Overwatch League teams that competed in the 2018 season could choose to extend their team's players' contracts. On August 31, before Dynasty released any of their players, Heo "Gambler" Jin-Woo retired from professional play and became a streamer for Gen.G Esports, the team's parent organization. Three days later, Dynasty acquired Baek "Fissure" Chan-hyung from Los Angeles Gladiators. Dynasty elected not to re-sign three players, releasing Gong "Miro" Jin-Hyuk, Moon "gido" Gi-Do, and Choi "Wekeed" Seok-Woo. The Dynasty also announced Kim "KDG" Dong-gun as the team's new head coach.

=== Free agency ===
All non-expansion teams could not enter the free agency period until October 8, 2018; they were able to sign members from their respective academy team and make trades until then. In this time, Dynasty transferred two players. Koo "xepheR" Jae-mo was transferred to Florida Mayhem on September 11, and Kim "KuKi" Dae-kuk was transferred to Los Angeles Valiant on September 13. On October 19, Dynasty signed three players in tank Choi "Michelle" Min-hyuk, tank Hwang "Marve1" Min-seo, and support Lee "Jecse" Seung-soo, along with an assistant coach in Lee "WhyNote" Ju-hyeop. Dynasty's final offseason transaction was on December 5, when the team signed DPS Kim "FITS" Dong-eun from Overwatch Contenders Trials team Goin Water S, bringing the team's roster total to ten players.

== Regular season ==
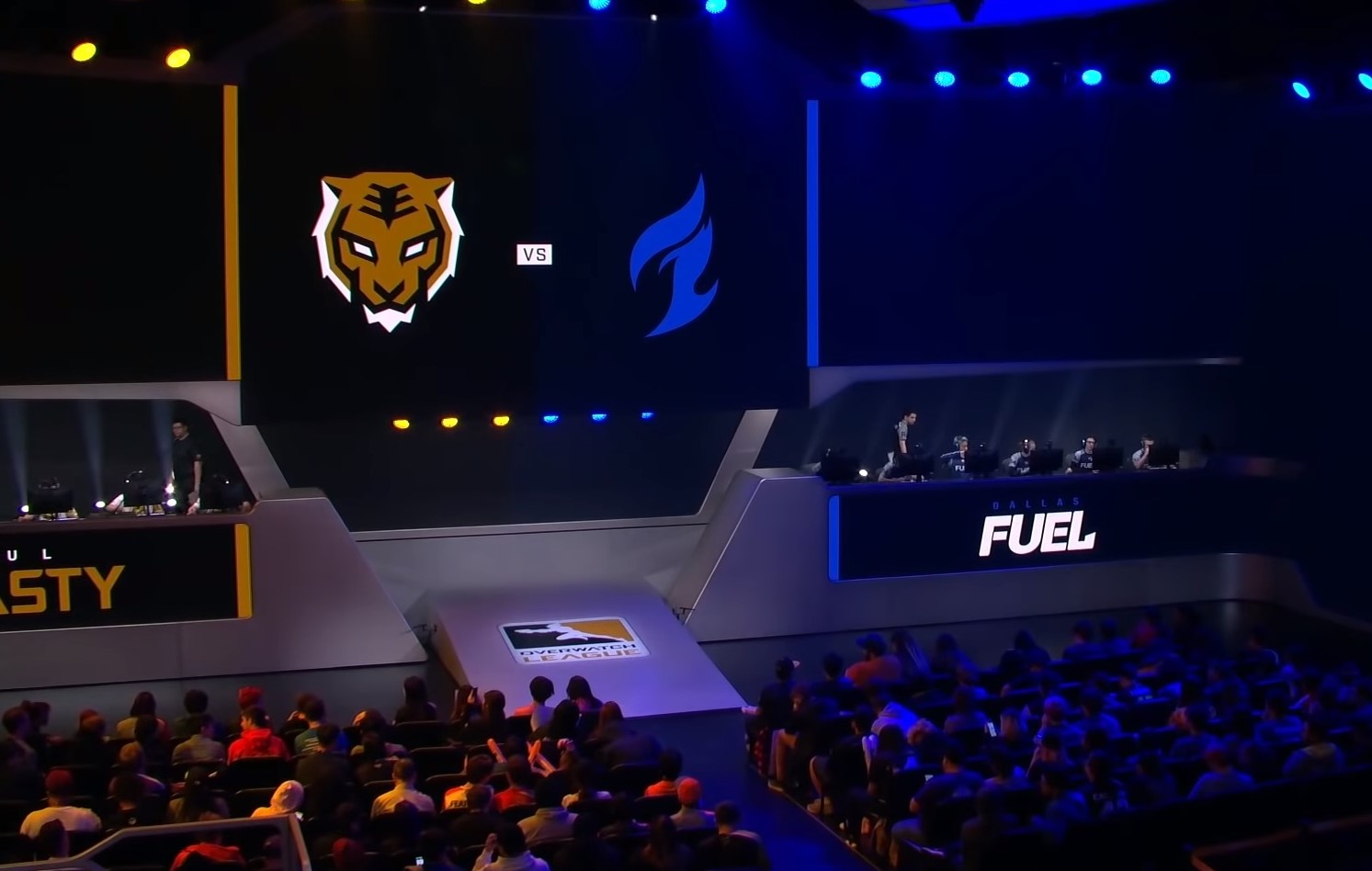
Seoul playing against Fuel in Stage 1 at Blizzard Arena.

=== Stage 1 ===
Dynasty began their 2019 season with victory over Los Angeles Gladiators; the match featured Gladiator's running Symmetra, marking the first time in Overwatch League history that a team utilized Symmetra in their composition. Dynasty lost to Dallas Fuel by a score of 1–3 in their second match of week 1. The following week, Seoul dominated Chengdu Hunters, sweeping them 4–0. Following losses to New York Excelsior and Boston Uprising in week 3, Dynasty signed DPS player Park "ILLICIT" Jae-min and flex support player Lee "Highly" Sung-hyeok. In week four, Seoul defeated Washington Justice in a match that was delayed 25 minutes due to a power surge. In their final match of Stage 1, Dynasty beat London Spitfire to clinch a Stage 1 Playoff berth. After the conclusion of the regular season, Dynasty and San Francisco Shock had the exact same record and map differential; by rule, the teams had to face each other in an offline tiebreaker match to determine seeding for the Stage 1 Playoffs. Seoul lost the match and was placed in the seventh seed in the playoffs.

Dynasty faced second-seeded and undefeated New York Excelsior in the Stage 1 Quarterfinals on March 21. Despite being heavy underdogs, Dynasty defeated Excelsior by a score of 3–1 to move on to the Semifinals against the undefeated Vancouver Titans. Unable to bring much of a challenge to Titans, Dynasty was swept 0–4 in the semifinals to end their playoff run.

=== Stage 2 ===
Dynasty opened Stage 2 on April 5 with a 2–3 loss to Los Angeles Gladiators. In a rematch of the Stage 1 Semifinals, Seoul faced Vancouver Titans in week two. While Dynasty was able to take a map this time, Titans won the match 3–1. The team was able to get things back on track in week three, as they swept Dallas Fuel 4–0. Seoul kept the momentum going into the "Dallas Fuel Homestand Weekend", sweeping Houston Outlaws and defeating Los Angeles Valiant 3–2. Needing a win in at least one of their final two matches of week five to realistically keep their Stage 2 Playoff hopes alive, Seoul was set to face Vancouver Titans for the third time this season and Hangzhou Spark. Seoul was unable to find a win in either match, finishing the stage with a 3–4 record.

=== Stage 3 ===
The Dynasty's first match of Stage 3 was against the Florida Mayhem on June 7; the team was rolled by the Mayhem, sweeping them 4–0. The following day, they faced the Guangzhou Charge. Seoul dominated throughout the match and picked up their second straight 4–0 sweep. The team kept their momentum going into their first match of the following week, as they swept the Atlanta Reign 4–0. The Dynasty could not find much of a footing throughout the match and were handed their own 0–4 loss. A week later, Seoul took on the Hangzhou Spark. After four maps, the series was tied up, forcing the match to a fifth tiebreaker map; the Dynasty fell on the fifth map to lose the match, 2–3.

Prior to their next match, main tank Baek "Fissure" Chan-hyung announced his retirement from the Overwatch League due to a "loss of love" for the game.

For their first match of the final week, the Dynasty faced the Paris Eternal on June 27. After a close loss on Nepal, both Paris and Seoul completed Horizon Lunar Colony to push the map to overtime rounds, but only the Dynasty were able to complete it a second time. On Eichenwalde, both team also completed the map to push the map into overtime rounds, but Paris was full-held in their second attack, while Seoul managed a tick. The final map, Watchpoint: Gibraltar, also went to overtime rounds; this time, Paris would take the map win, but the Seoul took match, 3–1. The team's final match of the stage was against the Chengdu Hunters three days later; Seoul took a clean 3–0 victory.

With a 5–2 record in Stage 3, the Dynasty claimed the fifth seed in the Stage 3 Playoffs. For their quarterfinals match, the team took on the fourth-seeded San Francisco Shock on July 12. The match opened on Oasis; the match was close, but the Dynasty came out with the map victory. San Francisco took the match to Numbani for map two. With a clean and methodological approach to their attack and their defense, the Shock managed to take the win in another close map. Seoul selected Volskaya Industries for map three, but the Shock secured a map victory after the map went to overtime rounds. Dorado, the fifth map, was again completed by both teams on their respective attacks, but again, the Shock emerged victorious to take the match. The 1–4 loss ended Seoul's playoff run.

=== Stage 4 ===
Prior to the beginning of Stage 4, which would include the implementation of an enforced 2-2-2 role lock by the league, the Dynasty mutually parted ways with DPS Byeon "Munchkin" Sang-beom, who was moved to an inactive role after Stage 3.

Seoul opened Stage for with a match against the Shock on July 26. The Shock adapted to the new role lock by subbing in and out players depending on the map type and composition they wanted to run; the strategy proved to be successful, as the Dynasty fell in the match, 1–3. Two days later, the team took on the Shanghai Dragons. The Dynasty found themselves down 1–2 going into the final map, Junkertown, but they were unable to push the match to a map five, losing 1–3. The team's next match was against the Los Angeles Valiant on August 1. After four maps, the series was tied up, forcing the game to a fifth tiebreaker map. The Dynasty came out with a 3–2 victory of the Valiant. The following week, Seoul first took on the Guangzhou Charge on August 8. After going up 2–0 going into halftime, the Dynasty fell apart, allowing the Charge to take the next three straight maps, and fell 2–3. Two days later, the Dynasty took on the Toronto Defiant. After a win on map one and a draw on map two, Seoul secured a win with a map three win. The fell on the final map but came out with a 2–1 match victory. For their final week of the regular season, the Dynasty first took on the Dragons on August 15; Seoul claimed a 3–1 win. The team's final match of the regular season was against the Philadelphia Fusion two days later. The Dynasty could not overcome solid performances by Fusion's Josue "EQO" Corona on Mei and Lee "Carpe" Jae-hyeok as they fell to Philadelphia by a 1–3. The loss took the Dynasty out of qualifying for the playoffs, and the team would have to go through the Play-In Tournament.

== Postseason ==
=== Play-In Tournament ===
With a 15–13 regular season record, the Dynasty finished in 8th place in the regular season standings, qualifying them for the Play-In Tournament. The team had a first-round bye in the tournament and faced the ninth-seeded Guangzhou Charge for the first match; the winner of the match would advance to the season playoffs. Seoul found themselves up 2–0 going into the match break. The Dynasty struggled to shut down the Charge on the third map, Horizon Lunar Colony, as they were only able to draw the map. The Charge came back on the next map, Rialto, with a win due in part to a strong performance from Charge DPS Charlie "Nero" Zwarg. However, Seoul DPS duo Kim "Fleta" Byung-sun and Kim "Fits" Dong-eon took over the match in the following two maps, leading Seoul to a 4–1 win.

=== Playoffs ===
With the win in the Play-In Tournament, the Dynasty qualified as the eighth seed in the season playoffs. Seoul began their playoff run with a match against the top-seeded Vancouver Titans on September 5. The Titans took control of the match early, claiming Lijiang Tower in the opening map. However, the Dynasty struck right back, grabbing the following two maps, Numbani and Horizon Lunar Colony. The hope for an upset with promptly shut down from there on out, as the Titans regrouped and took victories on Watchpoint: Gibraltar, Busan, and Eichenwalde to hand the Dynasty a 2–4 loss.

The loss to the Titans sent the Dynasty to the lower bracket, where they took on the fourth-seeded Hangzhou Spark in the first round two days later. The Spark took the first map of the match, Busan, but the Dynasty evened the series after winning on Eichenwalde. However, the Spark found their groove coming out of the match break, winning on Temple of Anubis, Dorado, and Lijiang Tower. The 1–4 loss eliminated Seoul from the playoffs.

== Final roster ==
2019 Seoul Dynasty roster
Players
Coaches

Role	No.	Handle	Name	Nationality
Damage	1	Fleta	Kim Byung-sun	South Korea
Damage	16	FITS	Kim Dong-eun	South Korea
Damage	21	ILLICIT	Park Jae-min	South Korea
Tank	5	zunba	Kim Joon-hyuk	South Korea
Tank	11	Marve1	Hwang Min-seo	South Korea
Tank	99	Michelle	Choi Min-hyuk	South Korea
Support	7	tobi	Yang Jin-mo	South Korea
Support	10	Highly	Lee Sung-hyeok	South Korea
Support	13	Jecse	Lee Seung-soo	South Korea
Support	14	ryujehong (C)	Ryu Je-hong	South Korea

Head coach

- Kim Dong-gun

Legend:
- (I) Inactive
- (S) Suspended
- (2W) Two-way player
- Substitute
- (injured) Injury / Illness

Latest roster transaction: July 25, 2019.

=== Transactions ===
Transactions of/for players on the roster during the 2019 regular season:

- On March 4, Dynasty signed Park "ILLICIT" Jae-min and Lee "Highly" Sung-hyeok.
- On June 26, Baek "Fissure" Chan-hyung retired.
- On July 25, Dynasty released Byeon "Munchkin" Sang-beom.

== Standings ==
=== Record by stage ===
Stage	Pld	W	L	Pct	MW	ML	MT	MD	Pos
1	7	4	3	.571	16	11	1	+5	6
2	7	3	4	.429	15	15	0	±0	10
3	7	5	2	.714	20	8	1	+12	5
4 (Note: No stage playoffs were held for Stage 4.)	7	3	4	.429	13	16	1	-3	13
Overall	28	15	13	.536	64	50	3	+14	8
Qualified for playoffs • Qualified for play-in tournament

=== League ===
Pos	Div	Team	Pld	W	L	PCT	MW	ML	MT	MD	Qualification
1	PAC	Vancouver Titans	28	25	3	0.893	89	28	0	+61	Advance to season playoffs (division leaders)
2	ATL	New York Excelsior	28	22	6	0.786	78	38	3	+40	Advance to season playoffs (division leaders)
3	PAC	San Francisco Shock	28	23	5	0.821	92	26	0	+66	Advance to season playoffs
4	PAC	Hangzhou Spark	28	18	10	0.643	64	52	4	+12	Advance to season playoffs
5	PAC	Los Angeles Gladiators	28	17	11	0.607	67	48	3	+19	Advance to season playoffs
6	ATL	Atlanta Reign	28	16	12	0.571	69	50	1	+19	Advance to season playoffs
7	ATL	London Spitfire	28	16	12	0.571	58	52	6	+6	Advance to play-ins
8	PAC	Seoul Dynasty	28	15	13	0.536	64	50	3	+14	Advance to play-ins
9	PAC	Guangzhou Charge	28	15	13	0.536	61	57	1	+4	Advance to play-ins
10	ATL	Philadelphia Fusion	28	15	13	0.536	57	60	3	−3	Advance to play-ins
11	PAC	Shanghai Dragons	28	13	15	0.464	51	61	3	−10	Advance to play-ins
12	PAC	Chengdu Hunters	28	13	15	0.464	55	66	1	−11	Advance to play-ins
13	PAC	Los Angeles Valiant	28	12	16	0.429	56	61	4	−5	
14	ATL	Paris Eternal	28	11	17	0.393	46	67	3	−21	
15	PAC	Dallas Fuel	28	10	18	0.357	43	70	3	−27	
16	ATL	Houston Outlaws	28	9	19	0.321	47	69	3	−22	
17	ATL	Toronto Defiant	28	8	20	0.286	39	72	4	−33	
18	ATL	Washington Justice	28	8	20	0.286	39	72	6	−33	
19	ATL	Boston Uprising	28	8	20	0.286	41	78	2	−37	
20	ATL	Florida Mayhem	28	6	22	0.214	36	75	5	−39	

Source: The Overwatch League
Rules for classification: 1) winning percentage; 2) map differential; 3) head-to-head record; 4) head-to-head map differential

== Game log ==
=== Regular season ===
2019 game log (Regular season record: 15–13)
Stage 1 (4–3)

1	February 14	Seoul Dynasty	3	–	1	Los Angeles Gladiators	Burbank, CA
		Recap					Blizzard Arena
		0	Ilios			2	
		3	King's Row			1	
		1	Horizon Lunar Colony			0	
		5	Route 66			4	

2	February 17	Seoul Dynasty	1	–	3	Dallas Fuel	Burbank, CA
		Recap					Blizzard Arena
		1	Busan			2	
		3	King's Row			4	
		4	Volskaya Industries			3	
		0	Rialto			1	

3	February 21	Seoul Dynasty	4	–	0	Chengdu Hunters	Burbank, CA
		Recap					Blizzard Arena
		2	Ilios			1	
		2	Hollywood			1	
		4	Horizon Lunar Colony			3	
		3	Rialto			2	

4	February 28	Seoul Dynasty	1	–	3	Boston Uprising	Burbank, CA
		Recap					Blizzard Arena
		1	Nepal			2	
		4	Numbani			5	
		4	Temple of Anubis			3	
		2	Route 66			3	

5	March 03	New York Excelsior	3	–	1	Seoul Dynasty	Burbank, CA
		Recap					Blizzard Arena
		2	Ilios			0	
		0	Numbani			1	
		1	Volskaya Industries			0	
		3	Dorado			0	

6	March 09	Seoul Dynasty	3	–	1	Washington Justice	Burbank, CA
		Recap					Blizzard Arena
		2	Busan			0	
		4	Hollywood			3	
		3	Temple of Anubis			2	
		3	Dorado			4	

7	March 16	London Spitfire	0	–	3	Seoul Dynasty	Burbank, CA
		Recap					Blizzard Arena
		1	Nepal			2	
		2	Hollywood			3	
		2	Temple of Anubis			2	
		2	Route 66			3	

Stage 2 (3–4)

8	April 05	Los Angeles Gladiators	3	–	2	Seoul Dynasty	Burbank, CA
	9:15 pm PST	Recap					Blizzard Arena
		0	Oasis			2	
		2	Paris			1	
		3	King's Row			2	
		3	Watchpoint: Gibraltar			4	
		2	Lijang Tower			0	

9	April 11	Vancouver Titans	3	–	1	Seoul Dynasty	Burbank, CA
	7:00 pm PST	Recap					Blizzard Arena
		2	Busan			0	
		3	Temple of Anubis			2	
		3	Eichenwalde			1	
		2	Rialto			3	

10	April 20	Dallas Fuel	0	–	4	Seoul Dynasty	Burbank, CA
	3:00 pm PST	Details					Blizzard Arena
		0	Lijiang Tower			2	
		2	Hanamura			3	
		1	Eichenwalde			2	
		4	Watchpoint: Gibraltar			5	

11	April 27	Houston Outlaws	0	–	4	Seoul Dynasty	Allen, TX
	1:10 pm PST	Recap					Allen Event Center
		1	Oasis			2	
		3	Paris			4	
		0	Blizzard World			3	
		3	Rialto			4	

12	April 28	Seoul Dynasty	3	–	2	Los Angeles Valiant	Allen, TX
	1:30 pm PST	Recap					Allen Event Center
		2	Busan			0	
		2	Hanamura			3	
		6	King's Row			3	
		2	Junkertown			3	
		2	Oasis			1	

13	May 04	Seoul Dynasty	0	–	4	Vancouver Titans	Burbank, CA
	3:00 pm PST	Recap					Blizzard Arena
		1	Lijiang Tower			2	
		1	Temple of Anubis			2	
		3	Blizzard World			4	
		1	Junkertown			3	

14	May 05	Seoul Dynasty	1	–	3	Hangzhou Spark	Burbank, CA
	4:30 pm PST	Details					Blizzard Arena
		2	Lijiang Tower			0	
		3	Hanamura			4	
		4	Blizzard World			5	
		3	Rialto			4	

Stage 3 (5–2)

15	June 07	Florida Mayhem	0	–	4	Seoul Dynasty	Burbank, CA
	5:45 pm PST	Details					Blizzard Arena
		0	Oasis			2	
		1	Paris			2	
		2	Hollywood			3	
		1	Havana			2	

16	June 08	Seoul Dynasty	4	–	0	Guangzhou Charge	Burbank, CA
	3:30 pm PST	Details					Blizzard Arena
		2	Oasis			0	
		2	Paris			0	
		3	Hollywood			1	
		3	Dorado			1	

17	June 15	Seoul Dynasty	4	–	0	Atlanta Reign	Burbank, CA
	1:45 pm PST	Details					Blizzard Arena
		2	Oasis			1	
		5	Volskaya Industries			4	
		3	Eichenwalde			2	
		3	Dorado			2	

18	June 16	San Francisco Shock	4	–	0	Seoul Dynasty	Burbank, CA
	12:00 noon PST	Details					Blizzard Arena
		2	Nepal			1	
		2	Volskaya Industries			0	
		4	Numbani			3	
		2	Havana			1	

19	June 22	Hangzhou Spark	3	–	2	Seoul Dynasty	Burbank, CA
	5:15 pm PST	Details					Blizzard Arena
		2	Ilios			0	
		3	Horizon Lunar Colony			2	
		0	Numbani			1	
		2	Havana			3	
		2	Oasis			0	

20	June 27	Paris Eternal	1	–	3	Seoul Dynasty	Burbank, CA
	7:15 pm PST	Details					Blizzard Arena
		1	Nepal			2	
		2	Horizon Lunar Colony			3	
		3	Eichenwalde			4	
		5	Watchpoint: Gibraltar			4	

21	June 30	Chengdu Hunters	0	–	3	Seoul Dynasty	Burbank, CA
	5:15 pm PST	Details					Blizzard Arena
		1	Ilios			2	
		5	Paris			5	
		1	Eichenwalde			2	
		1	Watchpoint: Gibraltar			3	

Stage 4 (3–4)

22	July 26	Seoul Dynasty	1	–	3	San Francisco Shock	Burbank, CA
	7:30 pm PST	Details					Blizzard Arena
		2	Busan			0	
		0	Temple of Anubis			1	
		2	Hollywood			3	
		1	Havana			3	

23	July 28	Shanghai Dragons	3	–	1	Seoul Dynasty	Burbank, CA
	12:00 noon PST	Details					Blizzard Arena
		2	Ilios			0	
		2	Temple of Anubis			1	
		0	Hollywood			1	
		3	Junkertown			1	

23	August 01	Los Angeles Valiant	2	–	3	Seoul Dynasty	Burbank, CA
	9:15 pm PST	Details					Blizzard Arena
		0	Busan			2	
		2	Hanamura			1	
		3	King's Row			0	
		3	Route 66			4	
		1	Ilios			2	

25	August 08	Guangzhou Charge	3	–	2	Seoul Dynasty	Burbank, CA
	9:15 pm PST	Details					Blizzard Arena
		1	Ilios			2	
		0	Hanamura			2	
		4	King's Row			3	
		3	Route 66			2	
		2	Lijiang Tower			1	

26	August 10	Seoul Dynasty	2	–	1	Toronto Defiant	Burbank, CA
	1:45 pm PST	Details					Blizzard Arena
		2	Lijiang Tower			1	
		2	Volskaya Industries			2	
		4	Blizzard World			3	
		0	Junkertown			1	

27	August 15	Seoul Dynasty	3	–	1	Shanghai Dragons	Burbank, CA
	7:30 pm PST	Details					Blizzard Arena
		2	Ilios			1	
		2	Hanamura			0	
		1	Blizzard World			0	
		0	Route 66			2	

28	August 17	Seoul Dynasty	1	–	3	Philadelphia Fusion	Burbank, CA
	3:30 pm PST	Details					Blizzard Arena
		1	Lijiang Tower			2	
		1	Volskaya Industries			0	
		2	Blizzard World			3	
		1	Havana			2	

=== Playoffs ===
2019 playoff game log
Stage 1 Playoffs (1–1)

Quarterfinals	March 21	Seoul Dynasty	3	–	1	New York Excelsior	Burbank, CA
	6:00 pm PST	Recap					Blizzard Arena
		2	Ilios			0	
		2	Hollywood			1	
		5	Volskaya Industries			6	
		3	Rialto			2	

Semifinals	March 23	Seoul Dynasty	0	–	4	Vancouver Titans	Burbank, CA
	12:00 noon PST	Recap					Blizzard Arena
		0	Busan			2	
		3	Hollywood			4	
		2	Temple of Anubis			3	
		3	Rialto			4	

Stage 3 Playoffs (0–1)

Quarterfinals	July 12	Seoul Dynasty	1	–	3	San Francisco Shock	Burbank, CA
	6:00 pm PST	Details					Blizzard Arena
		2	Oasis			1	
		2	Numbani			3	
		2	Volskaya Industries			3	
		3	Dorado			4	

Play-In Tournament (1–0)

Quarterfinals	First-round bye

Semifinals	August 31	Guangzhou Charge	1	–	4	Seoul Dynasty	Burbank, CA
	3:00 pm PST	Details					Blizzard Arena
		1	Busan			2	
		1	King's Row			2	
		5	Horizon Lunar Colony			5	
		3	Rialto			2	
		0	Lijiang Tower			2	
		3	Eichenwalde			4	

Season Playoffs (0–2)

First round	September 5	Seoul Dynasty	2	–	4	Vancouver Titans	Burbank, CA
	4:00 pm PST	Details					Blizzard Arena
		1	Lijiang Tower			2	
		3	Numbani			1	
		1	Horizon Lunar Colony			0	
		1	Watchpoint: Gibraltar			3	
		1	Busan			2	
		0	Eichenwalde			1	

Losers Round 1	September 7	Seoul Dynasty	1	–	4	Hangzhou Spark	Burbank, CA
	6:00 pm PST	Details					Blizzard Arena
		0	Busan			2	
		3	Eichenwalde			2	
		1	Temple of Anubis			2	
		2	Dorado			3	
		0	Lijiang Tower			2	
