= Zorya (disambiguation) =

Zorya may refer to:

- Zorya, personification of dawn in Slavic mythology
- Zorya (album), a release by the Canadian-Ukrainian singer-songwriter Luba
- FC Zorya Luhansk, Ukrainian football club
- Zorya, a village near Sarata, Odesa Oblast, Ukraine

== See also ==
- Zoria (disambiguation)
- Zarya (disambiguation)
