= Zaire (name) =

Zaire is a given name and surname. Notable people with the name include:

== Given name ==
- Zaire Anderson (born 1992), American football player
- Zaire Barnes (born 1999), American football player
- Zaire Bartley (born 1998), Jamaican footballer
- Zaire Franklin (born 1996), American football player
- Zaire Lewis (born 1980), member of hip hop producer duo Keelay and Zaire
- Zaire Mitchell-Paden (born 1999), American football player

== Surname ==
- Malik Zaire (born 1995), American media personality and former football player
- Nicolas Zaïre (born 1986), Martinique footballer

== See also ==
- Ziaire, given name
