= Zarya (Overwatch) =

Overwatch character

- Overwatch character
- Zarya's appearance in Overwatch
- First appearance: Overwatch (2016)
- Created by: Geoff Goodman
- Designed by: Arnold Tsang
- Voiced by: Dolya Gavanski

In-universe information
- Class: Tank
- Origin: Siberia, Russia
- Nationality: Russian

Zarya is the call sign of Aleksandra Zaryanova, a character who first appeared in the 2016 video game Overwatch, a Blizzard Entertainment–developed first-person hero shooter, and the resulting franchise. Voiced by Dolya Gavanski, Zarya is a Siberian champion weightlifter who enlists in a local defense force after her home comes under attack from robotic forces, later joining the restored peacekeeping force Overwatch. Conceived due to Geoff Goodman's desire to include a heavy weapon wielding character into the game, she was designed by Arnold Tsang after watching a weightlifting competition, feeling the concept would make for a strong character. Since her introduction, she has appeared in various spinoff media related to the franchise, including comics and merchandise, and later in another Blizzard developed title, Heroes of the Storm.

Zarya was seen by some as a response to criticisms against the game's original previewed female cast. Well received since her debut, her appearance has been cited as a positive deviation from the standard female character design and inspirational by others. Despite her sexuality not being explicitly discussed by Blizzard, many Western fans have viewed her as a lesbian, though journalists have noted this perception is not necessarily shared amongst Russian players. A Russian paper examining video game characters stated to be from that country heavily praised her as a deviation from the norm, calling Zarya a positive representation of the country and its people and further praising her character and personality as a whole.

== Conception and design ==
Her weapon went through several designs, with the bottom being the finalized look. The text on the side is мститель in Russian ("Avenger"), though in earlier concept art it read мщение ("Vengeance").

Developed for Overwatch, Zarya's concept started around gameplay elements, namely Game Director Geoff Goodman wanting to implement a character with a heavy gun and a shield generator. After watching a weightlifting competition, Assistant Art Director Arnold Tsang felt the concept would make for an "awesome" character for the game, and additionally wanted to create a "tough, female character with kind of a nonstandard body type." She was created in part to satisfy calls from fans to add more diverse body types after the initial set of heroes were revealed for the game. Her design was inspired by one of Blizzard's 3D artists, Tamara Bakhlycheva, particularly her hair color and style. Overwatch director Jeff Kaplan noted her as an example of how character designs challenge the stereotypes of their character types. The development team noted that unlike many characters in the game, Zarya's development from early concept to completion was "surprisingly smooth".

Standing 6 feet 5 inches (195 cm) tall, Zarya is a heavily muscular woman with pink hair cut into a pixie cut. Her outfit consists of pants and a tank top, with blue armor covering her legs, feet, and torso. The armor has multiple red ports on each plate, and wires connecting the torso to the legs. She wears armored fingerless gloves on each hand with similar plating and wires extending from the wrist to the fingers, and an elbow pad on her right arm. Her weapon, a large particle cannon, is wielded underhand by both hands, similar to a minigun. When designing it, the developers did not want it to outshine Zarya, so they built her design around it, with the wires and ports acting as a visible representation of her role as the cannon's conduit. On her left upper bicep near the shoulder is a tribal tattoo with the text "512", while a similar tattoo extends past the gloved area of her wrist up her forearm. The number is meant to represent the character's weight lifting world record in kilograms, and in an earlier version read 312 instead.

Like other Overwatch characters, Zarya received skins, unlockable cosmetic items to change her in-game appearance. When developing them, they wanted to build them around her backstory, and in particular her Russian heritage and role as a soldier. Of particular note are the "Industrial" skin, modeled after a punk rocker in black spiked clothing; the "Siberian Front" skin which shows her as a soldier with night vision goggles; and the "Champion" skin, meant to represent her time as a professional weightlifter and color-themed after the Russian flag. Several of her skins however were modified during the 2022 Russian invasion of Ukraine, with Blizzard removing the "Z" symbol on them. The "Z" symbol had become representative of pro-Russian war position, with soldiers displaying it on their military vehicles when invading the country.

Her design was significantly altered for Overwatch 2; in particular her haircut was changed into a ponytail with side fade, while her arm tattoo was extended into a full sleeve. Now additionally covering her upper biceps, her armor was heavily modified to a black and white appearance, while the visible wires and ports were reduced.

== Appearances ==
Aleksandra "Zarya" Zaryanova is a Russian woman introduced in the 2016 first-person shooter Overwatch. As a young woman in Siberia, her village was attacked by a robotic force called "omnics", which devastated the region. Seeking strength to protect her people and homeland from future assaults, she became a bodybuilder and weightlifter, and was expected to break a number of records in the world championships. However, dormant omnics reactivated in the area on the evening of the tournament, and she withdrew from the competition to join local defense forces. To this end she uses a particle cannon, originally stated to have been torn off an enemy vessel, but later retconned to be a company's experimental weapon deemed too heavy for others to use. Zarya was added to multiplayer online battle arena game Heroes of the Storm during its "Machines of War event" in September 2016 at the request of that game's director Jade Martin, due to her heavy use of the character in Overwatch. Zarya also returned for Overwatch 2. In all appearances, Zarya is voiced by Dolya Gavanski.

Her story is further fleshed out in the digital comic book series, first appearing in Zarya: Searching, the fifteenth issue of the 2016 Overwatch tie-in comic book series. In it, she is tasked by the CEO of the company that developed her weapon to track down the terrorist hacker Sombra. Working hesitantly alongside a friendly omnic named Lynx, they track down and capture Sombra, only for the hacker to reveal that the CEO has been receiving technology from partnerships with the enemy forces. Rescuing Lynx after Sombra hacks him, she decides to keep the information secret for the good of the Russian people. Later she appears in the fourth issue of Overwatch's New Blood comic miniseries, where gunslinger Cassidy asks her to join the global peace-keeping force "Overwatch", and she accepts after they defend her hometown from omnic forces. She later fights alongside him and the other Overwatch members as they protect the South Korean city of Busan from attack in issue 5.

=== Gameplay ===
In Overwatch, Zarya is classified as a Tank-class character, designed to absorb large amounts of damage from the enemy team in team compositions while protecting their teammates. Her weapon has two firing modes, one that fires in a steady stream of energy in a beam, and another that lobs a projectile that explodes upon impact that deals splash damage. She also has two activated abilities that will either deploy a shield (sometimes referred by players as "bubbles") on herself for a short period of time, or on a targeted ally for a shorter period. This shield absorbs incoming attacks and projectiles until its duration expires or it absorbs a certain amount of damage. Damage absorbed this way is converted into a boost to Zarya's own outgoing damage due to her "Energy" passive ability, with the amount diminishing slowly when not being replenished or entirely if Zarya is killed. Lastly her 'ultimate' ability, called "Graviton Surge", requires to be charged before use. The ability charges slowly during the course of gameplay, and can be charged faster through damage dealt to the enemy team. Once full the ability can be activated to fire a projectile that upon contact explodes into an area of effect field that will pull enemies towards it and immobilize them for a short period of time.

When developing her gameplay, Geoff Goodman stated that her primary concept was to develop a tank character that "wanted to take damage". They originally considered her gaining shields from absorbed damage, but instead focused on her shields powering up her weapon due to the lower damage output Tank-class characters in Overwatch were defined by. Graviton Surge was the first move they'd developed, and the team felt that had nailed it from the start, with only slight tweaking required. During this, they experimented with a different ultimate ability that would simultaneously project shields to all teammates at once, but felt it was "visually messy" and didn't have the same impact as Graviton Surge. Goodman added he felt the move also fit her personality, stating "[Zarya's] personality and background really lean into this 'c'mon and try to hit me' vibe that our game design was built on."

For Heroes of the Storm, most of her abilities remained unchanged. However, she gained an alternative option to Graviton Surge called "Expulsion Zone", which in contrast expels enemies from the targeted area for a brief period of time, dealing damage to them while also reducing their movement speed for the duration.

== Promotion and reception ==
To promote Overwatch and the character, she was hinted at on the main Overwatch Twitter account via a fake Russian fitness magazine cover that showed her in silhouette. The next month she was unveiled as a playable character at the PAX East convention in 2015. Since then she has been featured on various merchandise such as hoodies, promotional images themed around holidays, and an action figure by Hasbro, with a black and yellow armor variant released as an exclusive for GameStop stores.

Zarya's creation has been seen as a direct response to criticisms of the female characters introduced in Overwatch's initial previews, in particular to concerns raised by feminist critic Anita Sarkeesian. Since her reveal, she has been considered one of the most popular characters from the game. Jess Joho of Kill Screen called her status as the world's strongest woman "an apology, or, more accurately, [...] reparation" for the lack of plus-sized female representation in video games, and saw her as a response by Blizzard to accusations of a lack of diversity in their female character design, praising the conversation opportunities raised by her inclusion. Similarly, Den of Geek's Laura Hardgrave commented that she was "floored" by Zarya's character design, feeling she was a standout in the game and commending the fact that players could now identify with a "badass female character who actually looks like she can wield a giant gun." This particular sentiment was held by Kelly Cardigan of Kotaku, who cited her as an inspiration to begin lifting weights and engage in bodybuilding, calling her "exactly the hero I needed". In a presentation at the 2017 Brazilian Symposium on Computer Games and Digital Entertainment, Professor Georgia da Cruz Pereira described her as a unique character in not just Overwatch but games overall, and praised how her character's strength was reflected in both her own voice lines and in how other characters spoke to her in-game.

In 2019 Kotaku's Cecilia D'Anastasio noted many Western fans perceived Zarya as a gay icon, with multitudes of artwork depicting her as a lesbian in response to her appearance, a sentiment shared by fellow contributor Nathan Grayson. However, when asking Russian players for their views on the character, D'Anastasio found the responses more mixed, with some positive but others outright homophobic and transphobic towards her character design. Russian journalist Tim Seyfelmlyukov achieved similar results with his own study, comparing her design to a lesbian stereotype and telling D'Anastasio that people with her appearance were "super rare gems in Russia" due to the country's harsher laws against homosexuality. He added that, "because people are not exposed to gay people expressing themselves, people [here] don't make the connection." D'Anastasio herself made a point to emphasize that a woman's appearance should have no direct bearing on her sexual orientation, and closed with stating that Zarya was more than her perceived sexuality and Russian patriotism, questioning whether players would be able to come to terms with their own biases towards her.

Due to her Russian ethnicity, build, and large weapon, she has been compared to Heavy Weapons Guy from Team Fortress 2. The Russian paper titled Tendencies in Representation of Russian Culture in Computer Games also made this comparison when discussion portrayals of Russian characters in video games, though significantly preferred Zarya. It noted that she was not typical when it came to depictions of characters from the country, calling her a positive representation due to the focus on her displayed intelligence and personality. It further noted that while aspects of her design such as her military background and love for her country were common tropes in the portrayal of Russians, there was a higher emphasis on her "strength of mind, stamina, and desire to protect loved ones," and praised the emphasis of her portrayal as a hero first and foremost instead of a focus on her "Russianness".
