= List of Atlanta Reign players =

Atlanta Reign is an American esports team founded in 2018 that competes in the Overwatch League (OWL). The Reign began playing competitive Overwatch in the 2019 season.

All rostered players during the OWL season (including the playoffs) are included, even if they did not make an appearance.

== All-time roster ==
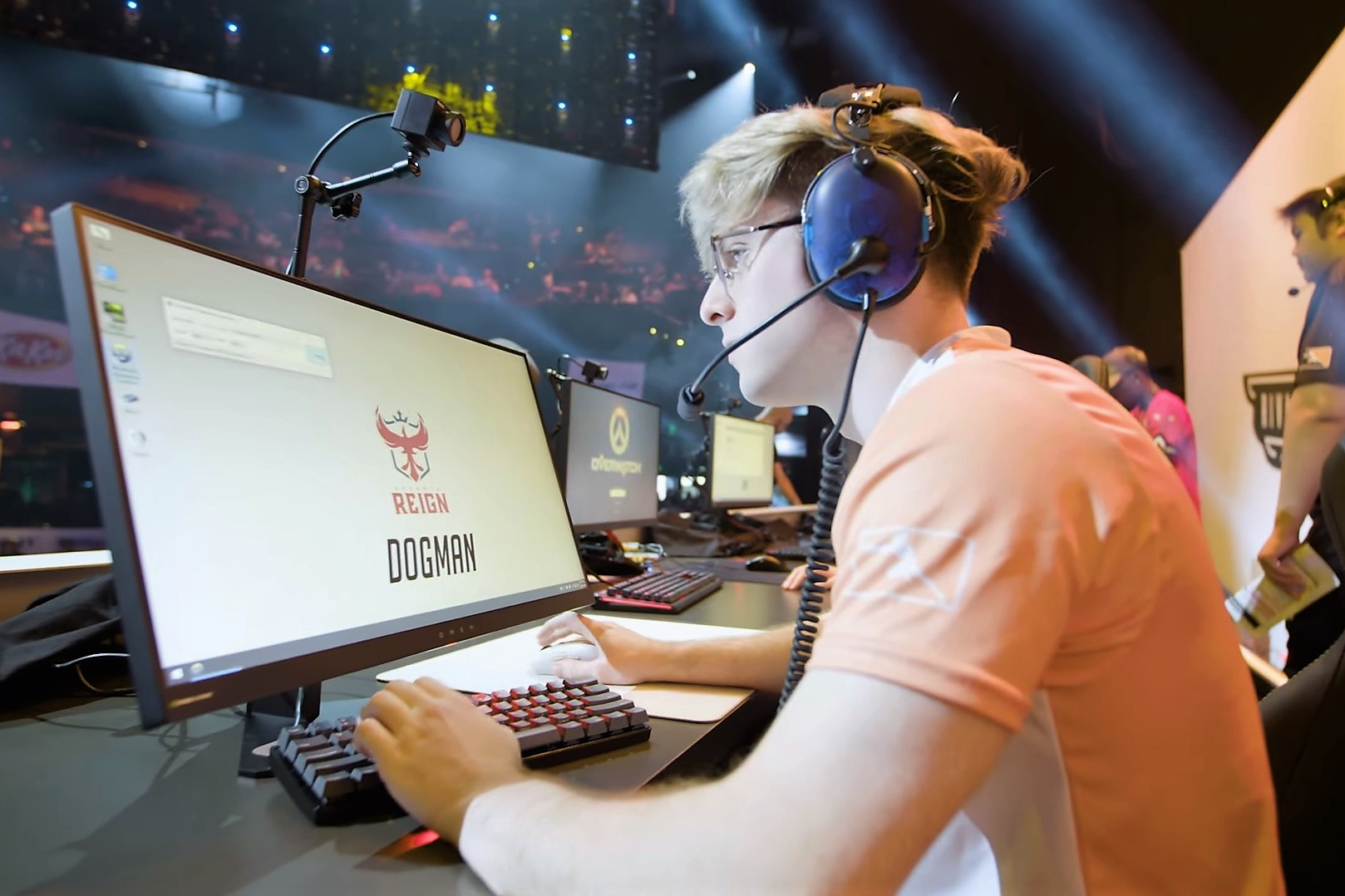
Dusttin "Dogman" Bowerman was the first Reign player to be selected for the All-Star Game.

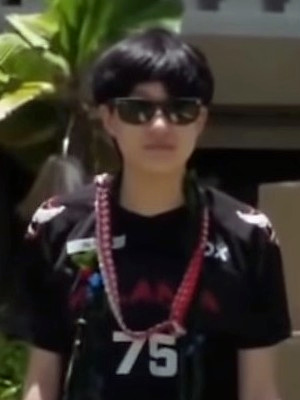
2021 OWL Rookie of the Year Oh "Pelican" Se-hyun.

As of September 30, 2022

Handle	Name	Role	Country	Seasons	Ref.
babybay	Andrej Francisty	Damage	United States	2019–2020	
DACO	Donghyeong Seo	Tank	South Korea	2019	
dafran	Daniel Francesca	Damage	Denmark	2019	
Dogman	Dusttin Bowerman	Support	United States	2019–2020	
Edison	Taehoon Kim	Damage	South Korea	2020–2021	
Erster	Joon Jeong	Damage	South Korea	2019–2020	
Fire	Anthony King	Support	United States	2020	
frd	Nathan Goebel	Tank	United States	2019–2020	
FunnyAstro	Daniel Hathaway	Support	United Kingdom	2019	
Gator	Blake Scott	Tank	United States	2019–present	
Hawk	Xander Domecq	Tank	United States	2020–present	
Ir1s	Seunghyun Kim	Support	South Korea	2020–2021	
Kai	Kai Collins	Damage	United Kingdom	2021–present	
Kodak	Steven Rosenberger	Support	Germany	2019, 2020	
Masaa	Petja Kantanen	Support	Finland	2019-2021	
nero	Charlie Zwarg	Damage	United States	2022–present	
NLaaeR	Ilya Koppalov	Damage	Russia	2019	
Ojee	Christian Han	Support	United States	2022–present	
Pelican	Sehyun Oh	Damage	South Korea	2021	
Pokpo	Hyunjun Park	Tank	South Korea	2019–2020	
Saucy	Roland Garrett	Damage	United States	2020	
SharP	Hugo Sahlberg	Damage	Sweden	2020	
Speedily	Nicholas Zou	Damage	United States	2022–present	
UltraViolet	Benjamin David	Support	United States	2022–present	
Venom	Dongkeun Lee	Damage	South Korea	2022–present	
Vigilante	Jun Kim	Support	South Korea	2022–present	
