= Doja Cat discography =

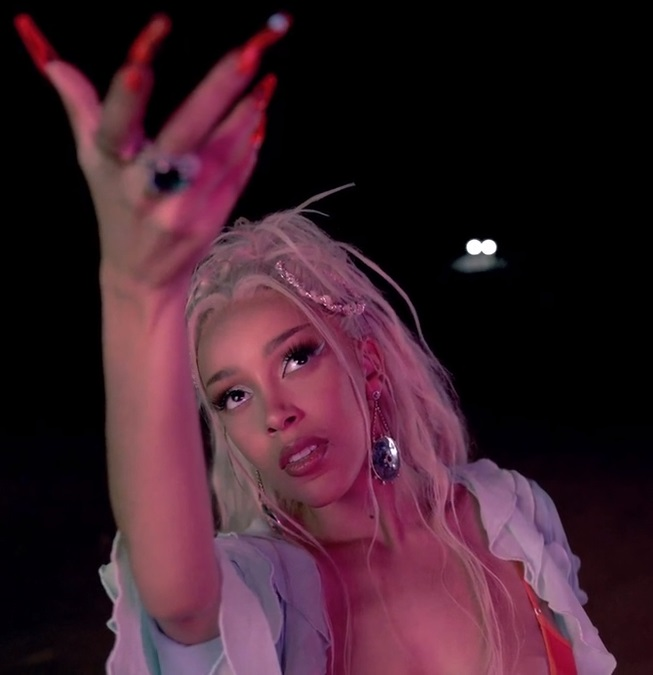
- Doja Cat in a 2021 advertisement for Amazon Music
- Studio albums: 5
- EPs: 1
- Singles: 51
- Music videos: 40
- Reissues: 2
- Promotional singles: 11

The discography of American rapper and singer Doja Cat consists of five studio albums, one extended play (EP), 51 singles (including 22 as a featured artist), 40 music videos, and 11 promotional singles. According to Recording Industry Association of America, Doja Cat has sold 64.5 million certified albums and singles in the United States as a lead artist.

Doja Cat self-released her debut single, "So High", before releasing her debut extended play (EP), Purrr! (2014). Following the release of Amala (2018) and a viral success of the song "Mooo!" in August of that same year, songs such as "Candy", "Tia Tamera", and "Juicy" became sleeper hits, prompting Doja Cat to release the deluxe edition of Amala in early 2019. Capitalizing on her growing popularity, her second studio album, Hot Pink (2019) ultimately charted in the top ten on the US Billboard 200; as well as the top 20 of countries such as Australia, Canada, Norway, Sweden, Netherlands and New Zealand. Hot Pink spawned the breakthrough single "Say So", and a remix featuring Nicki Minaj became Doja Cat's first number-one hit on the US Billboard Hot 100.

Doja Cat's third studio album, Planet Her (2021), peaked at number one in New Zealand and the top ten in thirteen countries, including the United States. It was a huge commercial success, becoming the biggest R&B album of the year in the US and the tenth best-selling album of the year worldwide. It spawned the top ten singles "Kiss Me More" (featuring SZA), "Need to Know", and "Woman". Her fourth studio album, Scarlet (2023), peaked within the top ten in Australia, Canada, Norway, Sweden, New Zealand, United Kingdom, and United States. Its lead single, "Paint the Town Red", became Doja Cat's most successful song to date, marking her second solo number-one on the Billboard Hot 100, the Global 200, and the UK Singles Chart among seven other countries, while the single, "Agora Hills", also entered the top ten in the United States.

== Albums ==
=== Studio albums ===
List of studio albums, with selected details, chart positions and certifications
Title	Details	Peak chart positions										Certifications
Title	Details	US	US R&B /HH	AUS	CAN	IRE	NLD	NOR	NZ	SWE	UK	Certifications
Amala	Released: March 30, 2018; Format: Digital download, streaming; Label: Kemosabe, RCA	138	— (Note: Amala did not enter the Top R&B/Hip-Hop Albums Chart, but peaked at number 16 on the Top R&B Albums Chart.)	— (Note: Amala did not enter the ARIA Albums Chart, but peaked at number 10 on the ARIA Hitseeker Albums Chart.)	—	—	—	—	—	—	—	RIAA: Gold; BPI: Gold; RMNZ: Platinum
Hot Pink	Released: November 8, 2019; Format: CD, LP, digital download, streaming; Label: Kemosabe, RCA	9	8	19	12	31	12	8	20	20	38	RIAA: 2× Platinum; ARIA: Platinum; BPI: Gold; GLF: Gold; RMNZ: 3× Platinum
Planet Her	Released: June 25, 2021; Format: CD, LP, digital download, streaming; Label: Kemosabe, RCA	2	1	2	2	3	3	2	1	2	3	RIAA: 2× Platinum; ARIA: 2× Platinum; BPI: Platinum; GLF: Platinum; IFPI NOR: Platinum; MC: 2× Platinum; RMNZ: 5× Platinum
Scarlet	Released: September 22, 2023; Format: Box set, CD, digital download, streaming; Label: Kemosabe, RCA	4	2	5	4	13	6	4	2	14	5	RIAA: Platinum; BPI: Silver; MC: Platinum; RMNZ: Gold
Vie	Released: September 26, 2025; Format: CD, LP, digital download, streaming; Label: Kemosabe, RCA	4	—	6	8	15	11	41	4	37	5	
"—" denotes a recording that did not chart or was not released in that territory.

=== Reissues ===
List of reissues, with selected details, chart positions and certifications
Title	Details	Peaks	Certifications
Title	Details	NZ	Certifications
Scarlet 2 Claude	Released: April 5, 2024; Format: LP, digital download, streaming; Label: Kemosabe, RCA	21	RMNZ: Platinum

== Extended plays ==
List of extended plays, with selected details
Title	Details
Purrr!	Released: August 5, 2014; Format: Digital download, streaming; Label: Self-released

== Singles ==
=== As lead artist ===
List of singles as lead artist, with selected chart positions and certifications, showing year released and album name
Title	Year	Peak chart positions										Certifications	Album
Title	Year	US	US R&B /HH	AUS	CAN	FRA	IRE	NLD	NZ	SWI	UK	Certifications	Album
"So High"	2014	—	—	—	—	—	—	—	—	—	—	RIAA: Gold; ARIA: Gold; BPI: Silver; RMNZ: Platinum	Purrr!
"Go to Town"	2018	—	—	—	—	—	—	—	—	—	—	RIAA: Platinum; ARIA: Gold; MC: Platinum; RMNZ: Gold	Amala
"Candy"	2018	86	36	92	55	—	81	—	—	—	—	RIAA: Platinum; ARIA: Platinum; BPI: Gold; MC: 2× Platinum; RMNZ: Platinum; SNEP: Gold	Amala
"Mooo!"	2018	—	—	—	—	—	—	—	—	—	—	RIAA: Gold; ARIA: Gold; MC: Gold	Amala
"Tia Tamera" (featuring Rico Nasty)	2019	—	—	—	—	—	—	—	—	—	—	RIAA: Platinum; ARIA: Platinum; BPI: Silver; MC: 2× Platinum; RMNZ: Platinum	Amala
"Juicy" (with Tyga) (Note: The solo version of "Juicy" is included as an album track on Amala, while the remix featuring Tyga is a single from Hot Pink.)	2019	41	18	—	57	—	—	—	31	—	80	BPI: Gold; MC: Gold; SNEP: Gold	Hot Pink
"Bottom Bitch"	2019	—	—	—	—	—	—	—	— (Note: "Bottom Bitch" did not enter the NZ Top 40 Singles Chart, but peaked at number 32 on the NZ Hot Singles Chart.)	—	—	RIAA: Gold; MC: Gold	Hot Pink
"Rules"	2019	— (Note: "Rules" did not enter the Billboard Hot 100, but peaked at number 19 on the Bubbling Under Hot 100 chart.)	— (Note: "Rules" did not enter the Hot R&B/Hip-Hop Songs chart, but peaked at number eight on the Bubbling Under R&B/Hip-Hop Singles chart.)	—	—	—	—	—	— (Note: "Rules" did not enter the NZ Top 40 Singles Chart, but peaked at number 17 on the NZ Hot Singles Chart.)	—	—	RIAA: 2× Platinum; ARIA: Platinum; BPI: Gold; MC: 2× Platinum; RMNZ: Platinum	Hot Pink
"Cyber Sex"	2019	—	—	—	—	—	92	—	— (Note: "Cyber Sex" did not enter the NZ Top 40 Singles Chart, but peaked at number 13 on the NZ Hot Singles Chart.)	—	—	RIAA: Platinum; ARIA: Platinum; BPI: Silver; MC: Platinum; RMNZ: Platinum	Hot Pink
"Say So" (solo or featuring Nicki Minaj)	2020	1	1	4	3	9	4	9	3	15	2	RIAA: 7× Platinum; ARIA: 8× Platinum; BPI: 2× Platinum; IFPI SWI: Platinum; MC: 8× Platinum; RMNZ: 5× Platinum; SNEP: Diamond	Hot Pink
"Boss Bitch"	2020	100	47	17	27	44	8	88	27	28	24	RIAA: 2× Platinum; ARIA: Platinum; BPI: Platinum; RMNZ: 2× Platinum; SNEP: Platinum	Birds of Prey
"Like That" (featuring Gucci Mane)	2020	50	18	67	29	—	50	—	— (Note: "Like That" did not enter the NZ Top 40 Singles Chart, but peaked at number 23 on the NZ Hot Singles Chart.)	—	62	RIAA: 3× Platinum; ARIA: 2× Platinum; BPI: Gold; MC: 3× Platinum; RMNZ: 2× Platinum; SNEP: Gold	Hot Pink
"Del Mar" (with Ozuna and Sia)	2020	— (Note: "Del Mar" did not enter the Billboard Hot 100, but peaked at number 20 on the Bubbling Under Hot 100 chart.)	—	—	—	30	—	—	— (Note: "Del Mar" did not enter the NZ Top 40 Singles Chart, but peaked at number 36 on the NZ Hot Singles Chart.)	51	—	SNEP: Diamond	ENOC
"Streets"	2021	16	7	12	19	105	9	81	10	27	12	RIAA: 6× Platinum; ARIA: 4× Platinum; BPI: 2× Platinum; IFPI SWI: Gold; MC: 6× Platinum; RMNZ: 4× Platinum; SNEP: Platinum	Hot Pink
"Kiss Me More" (featuring SZA)	2021	3	— (Note: "Kiss Me More" did not enter the US Hot R&B/Hip-Hop Songs chart but did peak at number 34 on the R&B/Hip-Hop Airplay chart.)	2	5	23	2	7	1	13	3	RIAA: 5× Platinum; ARIA: 7× Platinum; BPI: 2× Platinum; IFPI SWI: Gold; MC: 4× Platinum; RMNZ: 7× Platinum; SNEP: Diamond	Planet Her
"You Right" (with the Weeknd)	2021	11	2	11	10	120	11	59	6	38	9	RIAA: 2× Platinum; ARIA: 2× Platinum; BPI: Platinum; MC: 5× Platinum; RMNZ: 2× Platinum; SNEP: Gold	Planet Her
"Need to Know"	2021	8	— (Note: "Need to Know" did not enter the US Hot R&B/Hip-Hop Songs chart but did peak at number 40 on the R&B/Hip-Hop Airplay chart.)	9	16	73	8	53	5	29	11	RIAA: 4× Platinum; ARIA: 4× Platinum; BPI: Platinum; IFPI SWI: Gold; MC: 5× Platinum; RMNZ: 3× Platinum; SNEP: Platinum	Planet Her
"Woman"	2021	7	2	12	12	8	11	12	9	7	13	RIAA: 3× Platinum; ARIA: 4× Platinum; BPI: 2× Platinum; MC: 7× Platinum; RMNZ: 4× Platinum; SNEP: Diamond	Planet Her
"Handstand" (with French Montana featuring Saweetie)	2021	—	— (Note: "Handstand" did not enter the US Hot R&B/Hip-Hop Songs chart but did peak at number 33 on the R&B/Hip-Hop Airplay chart.)	—	—	—	—	—	— (Note: "Handstand" did not enter the NZ Top 40 Singles Chart, but peaked at number 40 on the NZ Hot Singles Chart.)	—	—		They Got Amnesia
"Freaky Deaky" (with Tyga)	2022	43	11	29	44	—	73	—	16	—	35	RIAA: Platinum; BPI: Silver; RMNZ: Platinum	Non-album single
"Get Into It (Yuh)"	2022	20	7	30	39	190	34	—	18	—	41	RIAA: 2× Platinum; ARIA: 2× Platinum; BPI: Gold; MC: 3× Platinum; RMNZ: 2× Platinum; SNEP: Gold	Planet Her
"Vegas"	2022	10	—	4	14	—	15	— (Note: "Vegas" did not enter the Dutch Single Top 100, but peaked at number 22 on the Single Tip chart.)	3	93	24	RIAA: 3× Platinum; ARIA: 2× Platinum; BPI: Gold; MC: 2× Platinum; RMNZ: 2× Platinum; SNEP: Gold	Elvis (Original Motion Picture Soundtrack)
"Paint the Town Red"	2023	1	1	1	1	5	1	2	1	1	1	RIAA: 4× Platinum; ARIA: 5× Platinum; BPI: 2× Platinum; IFPI SWI: 2× Platinum; MC: 7× Platinum; RMNZ: 4× Platinum; SNEP: Diamond	Scarlet
"Agora Hills"	2023	7	2	14	24	142	35	— (Note: "Agora Hills" did not enter the Dutch Single Top 100, but peaked at number 9 on the Single Tip chart.)	4	70	23	RIAA: 2× Platinum; ARIA: Platinum; BPI: Gold; MC: 3× Platinum; RMNZ: 3× Platinum; SNEP: Gold	Scarlet
"N.H.I.E." (with 21 Savage)	2024	19	9	51	15	95	39	22	37	29	27	RIAA: Gold; MC: Gold	American Dream
"Okloser"	2024	— (Note: "Okloser" did not chart on the Billboard Hot 100, but peaked at number 27 on the Mainstream Top 40 chart.)	—	—	—	—	—	—	— (Note: "Okloser" did not enter the NZ Top 40 Singles Chart, but peaked at number 17 on the NZ Hot Singles Chart.)	—	—		Scarlet 2 Claude
"Jealous Type"	2025	28	—	28	35	115	27	—	19	57	13	BPI: Silver; RMNZ: Gold	Vie
"Gorgeous"	2025	56	—	78	73	—	65	—	— (Note: "Gorgeous" did not enter the NZ Top 40 Singles Chart, but peaked at number 6 on the NZ Hot Singles Chart.)	—	34		Vie
"Go Girl" (with Summer Walker and Latto)	2026	60	11	—	—	—	—	—	—	—	—		Finally Over It
"—" denotes a recording that did not chart or was not released in that territory.

=== As featured artist ===
List of singles as featured artist, with selected chart positions and certifications, showing year released and album name
Title	Year	Peak chart positions										Certifications	Album
Title	Year	US	US R&B /HH	US Rhy.	AUS	CAN	GER	IRE	NZ	UK	WW	Certifications	Album
"Purple Light" (Elliphant featuring Doja Cat)	2014	—	—	—	—	—	—	—	—	—	—		One More
"The Wave" (Pregnant Boy and Left Brain featuring Doja Cat)	2015	—	—	—	—	—	—	—	—	—	—		1st Trimester
"Right Side" (L8LOOMER featuring Doja Cat)	2017	—	—	—	—	—	—	—	—	—	—		Soulm8s
"20 Below" (Sam Spiegel featuring Anderson .Paak and Doja Cat)	2018	—	—	—	—	—	—	—	—	—	—		Random Shit from the Internet Era
"Make That Cake" (LunchMoney Lewis featuring Doja Cat)	2019	—	—	—	—	—	—	—	—	—	—		Non-album singles
"Perfect (Remix)" (Cousin Stizz featuring Doja Cat and Bia)	2020	—	—	—	—	—	—	—	—	—	—		Non-album singles
"In Your Eyes (Remix)" (The Weeknd featuring Doja Cat)	2020	—	—	—	—	—	—	—	34	—	—		Non-album singles
"Anything You Want" (Jawny featuring Doja Cat)	2020	—	—	—	—	—	—	—	—	—	—		Non-album singles
"Pussy Talk" (City Girls featuring Doja Cat)	2020	— (Note: "Pussy Talk" did not enter the Billboard Hot 100, but peaked at number 10 on the Bubbling Under Hot 100 chart.)	44	38	—	—	—	—	—	—	—	RIAA: Platinum	City on Lock
"To Be Young" (Anne-Marie featuring Doja Cat)	2020	—	—	—	—	—	—	73	— (Note: "To Be Young" did not enter the NZ Top 40 Singles Chart, but peaked at number 16 on the NZ Hot Singles Chart.)	74	—		Non-album single
"Shimmy" (Lil Wayne featuring Doja Cat)	2020	—	—	18	—	—	—	—	— (Note: "Shimmy" did not enter the NZ Top 40 Singles Chart, but peaked at number 36 on the NZ Hot Singles Chart.)	—	—		Funeral (deluxe)
"Baby, I'm Jealous" (Bebe Rexha featuring Doja Cat)	2020	58	—	—	—	60	—	59	— (Note: "Baby, I'm Jealous" did not enter the NZ Top 40 Singles Chart, but peaked at number four on the NZ Hot Singles Chart.)	86	56	RIAA: Gold	Better Mistakes
"Do It" (remix) (Chloe x Halle featuring Doja Cat, City Girls, and Latto)	2020	—	—	—	—	—	—	—	— (Note: "Do It (Remix)" did not enter the NZ Top 40 Singles Chart, but peaked at number 38 on the NZ Hot Singles Chart.)	—	—		Non-album single
"Best Friend" (Saweetie featuring Doja Cat)	2021	14	6	1	35	40	1	36	39	35	41	RIAA: 4× Platinum; ARIA: Gold; BPI: Gold; MC: 4× Platinum; RMNZ: 2× Platinum	Pretty Bitch Music
"34+35" (remix) (Ariana Grande featuring Doja Cat and Megan Thee Stallion)	2021	2	—	—	—	—	—	—	—	—	2		Positions (deluxe)
"Dick" (Starboi3 featuring Doja Cat)	2021	— (Note: "Dick" did not enter the Billboard Hot 100, but peaked at number three on the Bubbling Under Hot 100 chart.)	44	—	95	77	—	58	— (Note: "Dick" did not enter the NZ Top 40 Singles Chart, but peaked at number 12 on the NZ Hot Singles Chart.)	74	94	RIAA: Gold; RMNZ: Gold	Non-album single
"I Like You (A Happier Song)" (Post Malone featuring Doja Cat)	2022	3	—	1	7	5	59	15	6	19	7	ARIA: 5× Platinum; BPI: Platinum; MC: 3× Platinum; RMNZ: 3× Platinum	Twelve Carat Toothache
"Kill Bill" (remix) (SZA featuring Doja Cat)	2023	—	—	—	—	—	—	—	—	—	—		Non-album single
"Born Again" (Lisa featuring Doja Cat and Raye)	2025	68	—	—	48	53	39	35	36	13	22	RIAA: Gold; BPI: Silver; RMNZ: Gold	Alter Ego
"Just Us" (Jack Harlow featuring Doja Cat)	2025	57	15	—	—	61	—	82	— (Note: "Just Us" did not enter the NZ Top 40 Singles Chart, but peaked at number five on the NZ Hot Singles Chart.)	50	96		Non-album single
"Lose My Mind" (Don Toliver featuring Doja Cat)	2025	— (Note: "Lose My Mind" did not enter the Billboard Hot 100, but peaked at number 11 on the Bubbling Under Hot 100 chart.)	—	—	—	62	—	73	— (Note: "Lose My Mind" did not enter the NZ Top 40 Singles Chart, but peaked at number 8 on the NZ Hot Singles Chart.)	85	41	MC: Gold; RMNZ: Gold	F1 the Album
"Okayyy" (Latto featuring Doja Cat)	2026	93	23	—	—	—	—	—	— (Note: "Okayyy" did not enter the NZ Top 40 Singles Chart, but peaked at number 37 on the NZ Hot Singles Chart.)	—	—		Big Mama
"—" denotes a recording that did not chart or was not released in that territory.

=== Promotional singles ===
List of promotional singles, with selected chart positions and certifications, showing year released and album name
Title	Year	Peak chart positions										Certifications	Album
Title	Year	US	US R&B /HH	US Rock	AUS	CAN	IRE	NLD	NZ	UK	WW	Certifications	Album
"No Police"	2014	—	—	—	—	—	—	—	—	—	—		Purrr!
"Shifty" (Mike Gao featuring Anderson .Paak and Doja Cat)	2015	—	—	—	—	—	—	—	—	—	—		Non-album single
"Roll with Us"	2018	—	—	—	—	—	—	—	—	—	—		Amala
"Freak"	2020	— (Note: "Freak" did not enter the Billboard Hot 100, but peaked at number 21 on the Bubbling Under Hot 100 chart.)	— (Note: "Freak" did not enter the Billboard Hot R&B/Hip-Hop Songs chart, but peaked at number 6 on the Hot R&B Songs chart.)	—	—	—	—	—	— (Note: "Freak" did not enter the NZ Top 40 Singles Chart, but peaked at number five on the NZ Hot Singles Chart.)	—	—	RIAA: Platinum; ARIA: Platinum; BPI: Silver; RMNZ: Platinum	Non-album singles
"You're the One That I Want"	2021	—	—	—	—	—	—	—	—	—	—		Non-album singles
"Celebrity Skin"	2022	—	—	18	—	—	91	—	— (Note: "Celebrity Skin" did not enter the NZ Top 40 Singles Chart, but peaked at number 11 on the NZ Hot Singles Chart.)	—	—		Non-album singles
"I Don't Do Drugs" (Y2K remix)	2023	—	—	—	—	—	—	—	—	—	—		Non-album singles
"Attention"	2023	31	11	—	30	29	27	— (Note: "Attention" did not enter the Dutch Single Top 100, but peaked at number 10 on the Single Tip chart.)	16	37	28	MC: Gold	Scarlet
"Demons"	2023	46	12	—	77	65	70	—	— (Note: "Demons" did not enter the NZ Top 40 Singles Chart, but peaked at number four on the NZ Hot Singles Chart.)	53	65	MC: Gold	Scarlet
"Balut"	2023	— (Note: "Balut" did not enter the Billboard Hot 100, but peaked at number 23 on the Bubbling Under Hot 100 chart.)	—	—	—	—	—	—	— (Note: "Balut" did not enter the NZ Top 40 Singles Chart, but peaked at number 10 on the NZ Hot Singles Chart.)	—	—		Scarlet
"Masc" (featuring Teezo Touchdown)	2024	— (Note: "Masc" did not enter the Billboard Hot 100, but peaked at number 19 on the Bubbling Under Hot 100 chart.)	—	—	—	—	—	—	— (Note: "Masc" did not enter the NZ Top 40 Singles Chart, but peaked at number 16 on the NZ Hot Singles Chart.)	—	—		Scarlet 2 Claude
"—" denotes a recording that did not chart or was not released in that territory.

== Other charted and certified songs ==
List of other charted and certified songs, with selected chart positions and certifications, showing year released and album name
Title	Year	Peak chart positions										Certifications	Album
Title	Year	US	AUS	CAN	FRA	IRE	NZ	SWE	SWI	UK	WW	Certifications	Album
"Wine Pon You" (featuring Konshens)	2018	—	—	—	—	—	—	—	—	—	—	MC: Gold; RMNZ: Gold	Amala
"Juicy" (solo version)	2019	—	68	—	—	—	— (Note: "Juicy" did not enter the NZ Top 40 Singles Chart, but peaked at number 35 on the NZ Hot Singles Chart.)	—	—	—	—	RIAA: 4× Platinum; ARIA: 2× Platinum; MC: 3× Platinum; RMNZ: 2× Platinum	Amala (Deluxe)
"Won't Bite" (featuring Smino)	2019	—	—	—	—	—	—	—	—	—	—	RIAA: Gold; ARIA: Gold; MC: Gold	Hot Pink
"Motive" (with Ariana Grande)	2020	32	19	25	128	13	29	84	63	16	16	RIAA: Platinum; ARIA: Platinum; BPI: Gold; RMNZ: Platinum; SNEP: Gold	Positions
"Naked"	2021	— (Note: "Naked" did not enter the Billboard Hot 100, but peaked at number five on the Bubbling Under Hot 100 chart.)	—	—	—	—	—	—	—	—	150	MC: Gold	Planet Her
"Payday" (featuring Young Thug)	2021	— (Note: "Payday" did not enter the Billboard Hot 100, but peaked at number nine on the Bubbling Under Hot 100 chart.)	—	—	—	—	—	—	—	—	163		Planet Her
"I Don't Do Drugs" (featuring Ariana Grande)	2021	57	43	37	—	—	31	—	—	— (Note: "I Don't Do Drugs" did not enter the UK Singles Chart, but peaked at number 78 on the UK Singles Downloads Chart.)	44	RIAA: Gold; ARIA: Gold; MC: Platinum; RMNZ: Gold	Planet Her
"Love to Dream"	2021	— (Note: "Love to Dream" did not enter the Billboard Hot 100, but peaked at number 12 on the Bubbling Under Hot 100 chart.)	—	—	—	—	—	—	—	—	186		Planet Her
"Been Like This"	2021	— (Note: "Been Like This" did not enter the Billboard Hot 100, but peaked at number one on the Bubbling Under Hot 100 chart.)	—	—	—	—	—	—	—	—	139	RIAA: Gold; ARIA: Gold; BPI: Silver; MC: Platinum; RMNZ: Platinum	Planet Her
"Options" (featuring JID)	2021	— (Note: "Options" did not enter the Billboard Hot 100, but peaked at number 11 on the Bubbling Under Hot 100 chart.)	—	—	—	—	—	—	—	—	185	MC: Gold	Planet Her
"Ain't Shit"	2021	24	70	27	—	22	8	—	—	26	24	RIAA: 2× Platinum; ARIA: 2× Platinum; BPI: Gold; MC: 3× Platinum; RMNZ: 2× Platinum	Planet Her
"Imagine"	2021	— (Note: "Imagine" did not enter the Billboard Hot 100, but peaked at number 21 on the Bubbling Under Hot 100 chart.)	—	—	—	—	—	—	—	—	—		Planet Her
"Alone"	2021	— (Note: "Alone" did not enter the Billboard Hot 100, but peaked at number 22 on the Bubbling Under Hot 100 chart.)	—	—	—	—	—	—	—	—	—		Planet Her
"Scoop" (Lil Nas X featuring Doja Cat)	2021	42	—	41	135	—	— (Note: "Scoop" did not enter the NZ Top 40 Singles Chart, but peaked at number 5 on the NZ Hot Singles Chart.)	— (Note: "Scoop" did not enter the Swedish Singellista Chart, but peaked at number 4 on the Swedish Heatseeker Chart.)	—	—	36	RIAA: Gold	Montero
"Wet Vagina"	2023	— (Note: "Wet Vagina" did not enter the Billboard Hot 100, but peaked at number 14 on the Bubbling Under Hot 100 chart.)	—	—	—	—	— (Note: "Wet Vagina" did not enter the NZ Top 40 Singles Chart, but peaked at number 12 on the NZ Hot Singles Chart.)	—	—	—	—		Scarlet
"Fuck the Girls (FTG)"	2023	— (Note: "Fuck the Girls (FTG)" did not enter the Billboard Hot 100, but peaked at number 24 on the Bubbling Under Hot 100 chart.)	—	—	—	—	—	—	—	—	—		Scarlet
"Ouchies"	2023	— (Note: "Ouchies" did not enter the Billboard Hot 100, but peaked at number 19 on the Bubbling Under Hot 100 chart.)	—	—	—	—	— (Note: "Ouchies" did not enter the NZ Top 40 Singles Chart, but peaked at number 13 on the NZ Hot Singles Chart.)	—	—	—	—		Scarlet
"Gun"	2023	— (Note: "Gun" did not enter the Billboard Hot 100, but peaked at number 12 on the Bubbling Under Hot 100 chart.)	—	—	—	—	— (Note: "Gun" did not enter the NZ Top 40 Singles Chart, but peaked at number 11 on the NZ Hot Singles Chart.)	—	—	—	—		Scarlet
"Go Off"	2023	— (Note: "Go Off" did not enter the Billboard Hot 100, but peaked at number 20 on the Bubbling Under Hot 100 chart.)	—	—	—	—	—	—	—	—	—		Scarlet
"Can't Wait"	2023	— (Note: "Can't Wait" did not enter the Billboard Hot 100, but peaked at number 22 on the Bubbling Under Hot 100 chart.)	—	—	—	—	—	—	—	—	—		Scarlet
"Urrrge!!!!!!!!!!" (featuring ASAP Rocky)	2024	—	—	—	—	—	— (Note: "Urrrge!!!!!!!!!!" did not enter the NZ Top 40 Singles Chart, but peaked at number 29 on the NZ Hot Singles Chart.)	—	—	—	—		Scarlet 2 Claude
"Cards"	2025	— (Note: "Cards" did not enter the Billboard Hot 100, but peaked at number 25 on the Bubbling Under Hot 100 chart.)	—	—	—	—	— (Note: "Cards" did not enter the NZ Top 40 Singles Chart, but peaked at number 10 on the NZ Hot Singles Chart.)	—	—	—	—		Vie
"Aaahh Men!"	2025	—	—	—	—	—	— (Note: "Aaahh Men!" did not enter the NZ Top 40 Singles Chart, but peaked at number 9 on the NZ Hot Singles Chart.)	—	—	—	—		Vie
"Stranger"	2025	— (Note: "Stranger" did not enter the Billboard Hot 100, but peaked at number 24 on the Bubbling Under Hot 100 chart.)	—	—	—	—	—	—	—	—	—		Vie
"Take Me Dancing" (featuring SZA)	2025	—	—	—	—	—	— (Note: "Take Me Dancing" did not enter the NZ Top 40 Singles Chart, but peaked at number 11 on the NZ Hot Singles Chart.)	—	—	—	—		Vie
"—" denotes a recording that did not chart or was not released in that territory.

== Guest appearances ==
List of guest appearances, with other performing artists, showing year released and album name
Title	Year	Other artist(s)	Album
"Lord Cooler"	2015	Tru Heru	The Art of Dying
"Waffle House"	2015	Tru Heru	The Art of Dying
"In My Feelings"	2015	Skoolie Escobar	Sincerest Apologies
"Equally Lost"	2019	Tove Lo	Sunshine Kitty
"BMO" (remix)	2020	Ari Lennox	Shea Butter Baby (Remix EP)
"Icy Hot"	2021	Young Thug	Punk
"Still Can't Fuh"	2025	Lizzo	My Face Hurts from Smiling

== Music videos ==
List of music videos, with directors, showing year released
Title	Year	Director(s)	Ref.
As lead artist
"So High"	2014	Jesse Salto; Amala Dlamini	
"Go to Town"	2018	Jabari Jacobs	
"Mooo!"	2018	Amala Dlamini	
"Tia Tamera" (featuring Rico Nasty)	2019	Roxana Baldovin	
"Juicy" (with Tyga)	2019	Jack Begert	
"Bottom Bitch"	2019	Jack Begert	
"Rules"	2019	Christian Sutton	
"Cyber Sex"	2019	Jack Begert	
"Boss Bitch"	2020	Jack Begert	
"Say So"	2020	Hannah Lux Davis	
"Like That" (featuring Gucci Mane)	2020	Daniel Iglesias Jr.	
"Del Mar" (with Ozuna and Sia)	2020	Nuno Gomes	
"Streets"	2021	Christian Breslauer	
"Kiss Me More" (featuring SZA)	2021	Warren Fu	
"Need to Know"	2021	Miles & AJ	
"You Right" (with the Weeknd)	2021	Quentin Deronizer	
"Woman"	2021	child.	
"Handstand" (with French Montana featuring Saweetie)	2021	Edgar Esteves; Jon Primo	
"Get Into It (Yuh)"	2022	Mike Diva	
"Freaky Deaky" (with Tyga)	2022	Christian Breslauer	
"Vegas"	2022	Child	
"Attention"	2023	Tanu Muino	
"Paint the Town Red"	2023	Nina McNeely	
"Demons"	2023	Christian Breslauer	
"Agora Hills"	2023	Hannah Lux Davis; Amala Dlamini	
"Masc" (featuring Teezo Touchdown)	2024	Amala Dlamini; Jamal Peters	
"Jealous Type"	2025	Boni Mata	
"Gorgeous"	2025	Bardia Zeinali	
"Stranger"	2025	Dave Meyers	
As a featured artist
"The Wave" (Pregnant Boy and Left Brain featuring Doja Cat)	2018	Unknown	
"Make That Cake" (LunchMoney Lewis featuring Doja Cat)	2019	Chris Moreno	
"Pussy Talk" (City Girls featuring Doja Cat)	2020	Daps	
"To Be Young" (Anne-Marie featuring Doja Cat)	2020	Hannah Lux Davis	
"Baby, I'm Jealous" (Bebe Rexha featuring Doja Cat)	2020	Hannah Lux Davis	
"34+35" (remix) (Ariana Grande featuring Doja Cat and Megan Thee Stallion)	2021	Stefan Kohli	
"Best Friend" (Saweetie featuring Doja Cat)	2021	Dave Meyers	
"I Like You (A Happier Song)" (Post Malone featuring Doja Cat)	2022	child.	
"Born Again" (Lisa featuring Doja Cat and Raye)	2025	Bardia Zeinali	
"Just Us" (Jack Harlow featuring Doja Cat)	2025	Neal Farmer	
"Lose My Mind" (Don Toliver featuring Doja Cat)	2025	Christian Breslauer	
Guest appearance
"Shower" (Becky G)	2014	Tim Nackashi	
