= Streets (song) =

2021 single by Doja Cat

- Remixes artwork

Single by Doja Cat

from the album Hot Pink
- A-side: "Kiss Me More"
- Released: February 16, 2021 (Note: This date is when the song impacted US contemporary hit radio stations. In a Billboard article published five days prior, writer Trevor Anderson had already referred to "Streets" as a single but did not mention any exact date on which it was first released as such.)
- Recorded: 2019
- Studio: Westlake (Los Angeles)
- Genre: R&B
- Length: 3:46
- Label: Kemosabe; RCA
- Songwriters: Amala Zandile Dlamini; Darius Logan; Dominique Logan; David Sprecher; Lydia Asrat; Theron Otis Feemster; Christopher Jefferies; Demarie Sheki
- Producer: Blaq Tuxedo

Doja Cat singles chronology
"34+35" (remix) (2021)	"Streets" (2021)	"Kiss Me More" (2021)

Music video
- "Streets" on YouTube

"Streets" is a song by American rapper and singer Doja Cat from her second studio album, Hot Pink (2019). She wrote it with David Sprecher and Lydia Asrat, alongside its producers Dominique and Darius Logan. (Note: Additional writing credits were given for Theron Feemster, Christopher Jefferies, and Demarie Sheki because "Streets" samples the 2003 song "Streets Is Callin'", for which the three served as songwriters.) In "Streets", an R&B ballad with elements of trap music, Doja Cat sings and raps about her desire to return to a former romantic partner. Some critics who reviewed Hot Pink praised the song for demonstrating her versatility as a musical artist.

"Streets" became an Internet-driven sleeper hit in early 2021. It gained commercial success after the "Silhouette Challenge", an online challenge in which participants struck poses while illuminated from behind with red lighting, used the song as background music and went viral on TikTok. Reacting to its online popularity, Kemosabe and RCA Records promoted "Streets" to US contemporary hit radio stations on February 16, 2021. With this, the song became Hot Pink's seventh and final single. Assisted primarily by streams and digital sales, "Streets" peaked at number 16 and number 8 on the US Billboard Hot 100 and Global 200 charts, respectively. It received platinum certifications in nine countries.

Doja Cat performed "Streets" in three videos posted to YouTube during 2020; she also included it in performances at the 2021 iHeartRadio Music Awards and the 2022 Coachella festival. A music video for the song, directed by Christian Breslauer, premiered via YouTube on March 9, 2021. It depicts Doja Cat's attempt to seduce a cab driver by performing her version of the Silhouette Challenge, after which she proceeds to trap him in a giant web. Critics described the video as erotic, horror-fantasy, and reminiscent of film noir.

== Background ==
Doja Cat released her debut studio album Amala in March 2018, four years after the viral success of her first single, "So High". The album received little media coverage. Meanwhile, in August of the same year, she self-published a music video for "Mooo!", a novelty song that incorporated elements of Generation Z humor and meme culture. Achieving unanticipated popularity on several social media platforms, it bolstered Doja Cat's rise to mainstream fame. This prompted her to issue and promote a deluxe edition of Amala. She included "Mooo!" in its tracklist, along with the single "Tia Tamera", featuring the rapper Rico Nasty, as well as the song "Juicy".

A remix of "Juicy", with a guest appearance from the rapper Tyga, served as the lead single for Doja Cat's next album, Hot Pink (2019). Commercially successful, the single became her first to reach the US Billboard Hot 100. Furthermore, it went viral on the video-hosting application TikTok, where several dance challenge clips used it as background music. During 2019, Doja Cat released three more singles in promotion of Hot Pink: "Bottom Bitch", "Rules", and "Cyber Sex". By September 2021, "Rules" and "Cyber Sex" had appeared in 64,200 and 171,400 TikTok videos, respectively.

TikTok's users contributed to the popularity of two more tracks from Hot Pink. One of these is "Say So", which topped the Billboard Hot 100 and earned Doja Cat her first number one on the chart. The other song, "Like That", received a platinum certification from the Recording Industry Association of America (RIAA). (Note: A platinum certification from the RIAA denotes 1,000,000 units consisting of sales and on-demand streaming.) Pitchfork writer Cat Zhang believed that the TikTok-driven successes of "Say So" and "Like That" demonstrated that Doja Cat had an "unimpeachable [...] reign" over the application. Aliya Chaudhry of Slate argued that TikTok users' propensity of making songs go viral – often due to an Internet challenge – factored into solidifying Doja Cat's status as a household name.

== Production and songwriting ==
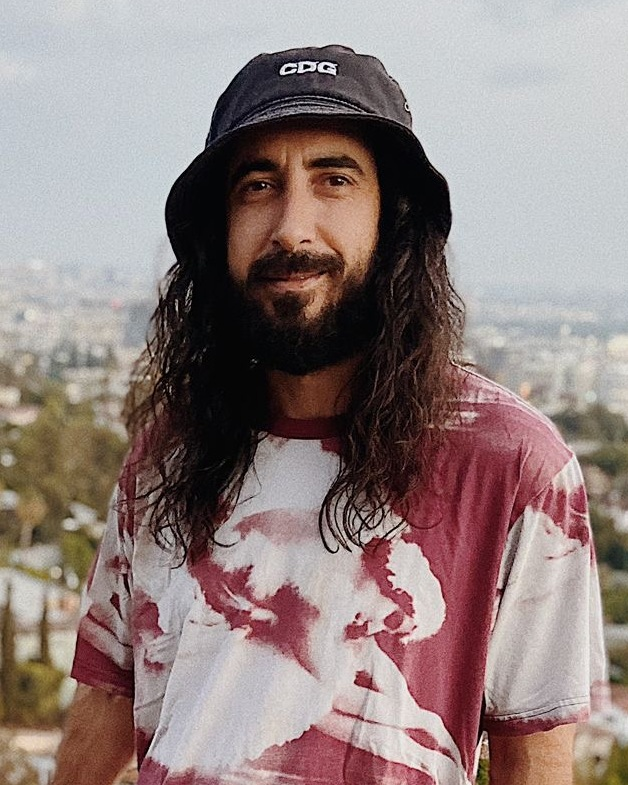
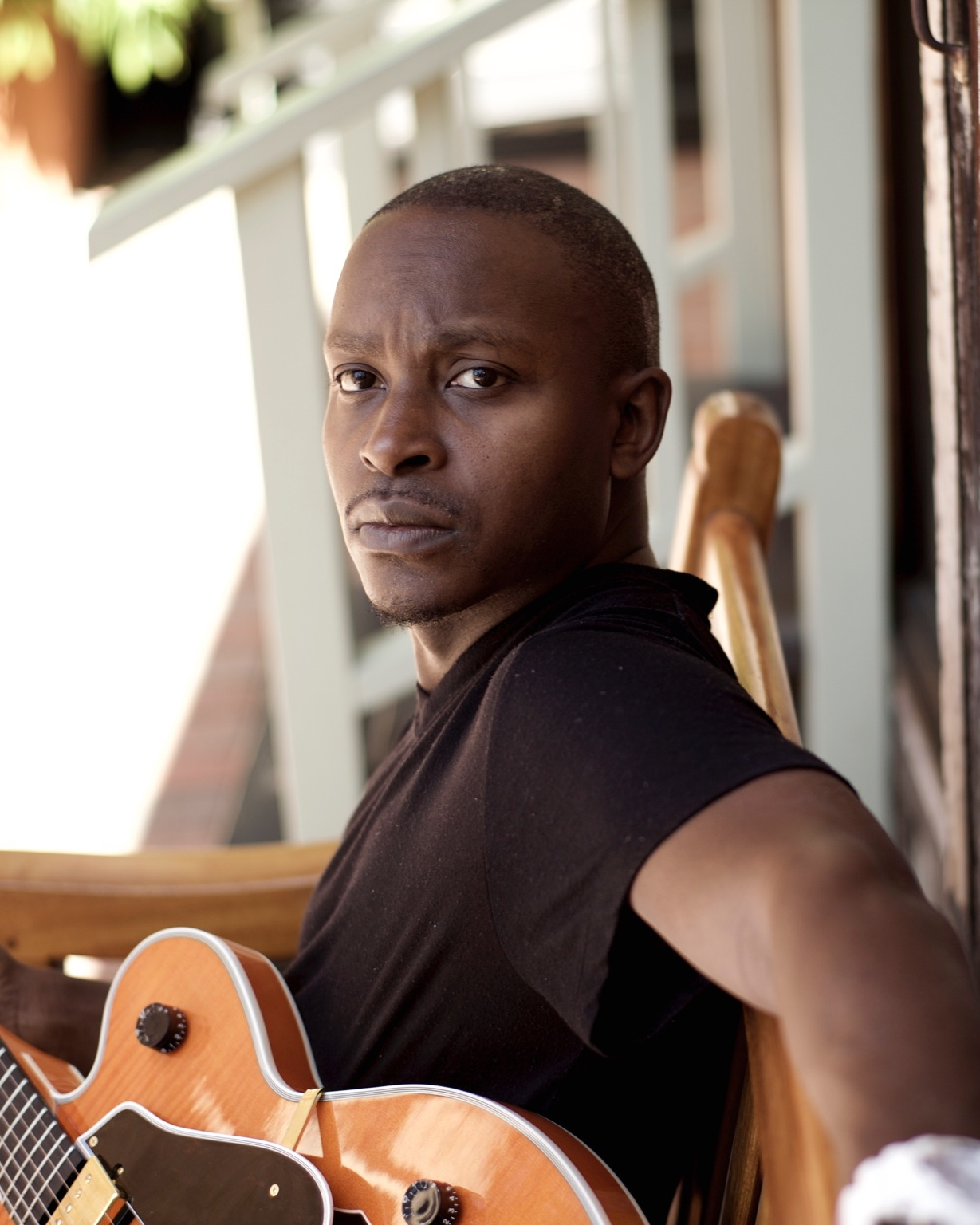
Yeti Beats (left, pictured in 2021) co-wrote 11 out of 12 songs on the standard edition of Hot Pink, including "Streets". The track samples B2K's 2003 song "Streets is Callin'", written in part by Theron Feemster (right, pictured in 2015).

Doja Cat, David Sprecher, and Lydia Asrat wrote the original version of "Streets" with the track's producers Dominique and Darius Logan, brothers who comprise a band called Blaq Tuxedo. It incorporates a sample from a 2003 song entitled "Streets Is Callin'", performed by R&B band B2K for the soundtrack to the film You Got Served (2004). The song was written by Theron Feemster, Christopher Jefferies, and Demarie Sheki. Because of the sampling, the three received writing credits for "Streets".

"Streets" is an R&B ballad that contains elements of trap. (Note: In an analysis of the song, Billboard called "Streets" an R&B ballad. Pitchfork described it as a ballad in a review of Hot Pink and a "trap-laced" R&B track in a music video ranking that included the video for "Streets". An album review from Consequence of Sound called it "melancholy R&B".) It has a duration of 3 minutes and 46 seconds, and has been described as "sultry", "melanchol[ic]", and "soulful". (Note: Attributed to Rolling Stone's E. J. Dickson, Consequence of Sound's Lucy Shanker, and Billboard's Jason Lipshutz, respectively.) Jade Gomez of Paste called the song's vocal performance an immersive blend between a "wispy" singing voice and a "raspy" rap delivery; AllMusic reviewer Fred Thomas described this as a transition from "breathy" verses into "unexpected scattershot rhymes". With regards to the composition in "Streets", Thomas explained that it was a slow-paced track, complete with "dark harmonies, trap hi-hats, and psychedelic textures". In the lyrics, Doja Cat admits that she cannot imagine herself without her ex-partner after their breakup and proceeds to, in the views of Billboard editor Jason Lipshutz, demonstrate her emotional depth:

I can't sleep no more
In my head, we belong
And I can't be without you
Why can't I find no one like you?

== Silhouette Challenge ==
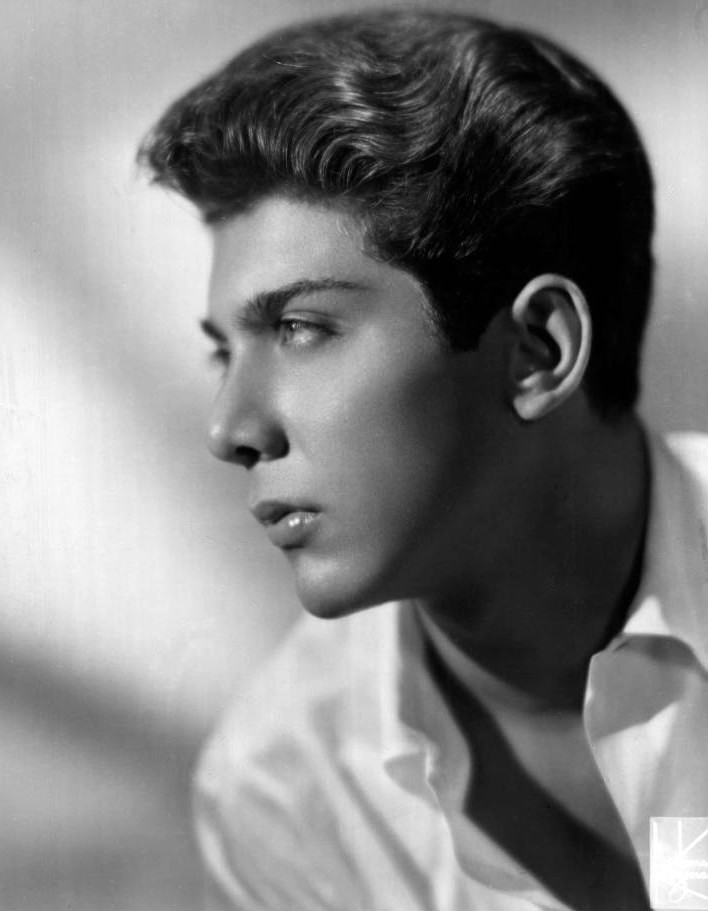
The Silhouette Challenge on TikTok featured the 1959 song "Put Your Head on My Shoulder" by Paul Anka (pictured in 1961).

Hot Pink, the album in which "Streets" appears, was released on November 7, 2019. Initially, the song was not intended to be sent to radio stations as a single. Although the senior staff in RCA Records considered it a highlight of the album, they did not think "Streets" would gain a similar level of recognition as "Say So", "Like That", or "Juicy". Speaking on behalf of the label in an interview with Billboard, the chief operating officer John Fleckenstein thought that he and the others had "moved on" from Hot Pink with the amount of singles the album produced.

In the beginning of 2021, around 15 months after its initial release, the track experienced a surge in popularity on TikTok. There, user Giulia Di Nicolantonio created a mashup of "Streets" and the 1959 Paul Anka song "Put Your Head on My Shoulder". The mashup became the soundtrack for the "Silhouette Challenge", an online video trend. Participants of the challenge would pose and dance to the rhythm of the two songs; Anka's part played first. Once "Put Your Head on My Shoulder" ended and the beat dropped to signal the beginning of "Streets", TikTok users would then show themselves covered in red lighting, backlit to give the impression of a silhouette.

The Silhouette Challenge went viral. Consequently, it helped to propel "Streets" up the Billboard Hot 100 and Spotify Top 200 charts. Within one month, the mashup had appeared in over 300,000 videos on TikTok, and clips that contained the hashtag "Silhouette" had been viewed around 526 million times. Recording artists who took part in the trend include Cardi B, Lizzo, and Chloe Bailey from Chloe x Halle.

== Critical reception ==
Consequence of Sound's Lucy Shanker, in a review of Hot Pink, argued that "Streets" presents Doja Cat "in her most serious form". For Lakin Starling of Pitchfork, the track fell under the "ultra-soft and chill" side of the album. Shanker hailed "Streets" as one of Hot Pink's best songs and cited how it demonstrated Doja Cat's musical versatility: "[in the previous songs, she] sounds great, but just as you settle into hearing her in that manner, she switches it up again." Starling shared a similar opinion about this versatility, but wrote that Doja Cat ran the risk of having listeners mistake her for another artist due to Hot Pink's use of several musical styles. Nonetheless, Starling praised Doja Cat's slow and raspy voice which was present in tracks like "Streets", believing that such vocal performances constituted one of the album's clearest.

In an analysis of "Streets", Aaron Williams of Uproxx opined that Doja Cat's reaction to its growing popularity was an example of how to properly handle fame online. He wrote that she can adapt to her audience's interests and activities, consciously capitalizing on the Internet trends that her fans create and letting them determine which songs she should promote as new singles. Williams described this behavior as "rid[ing] the changing tides" whenever any of her old releases eventually go viral. Similarly, staff writers at Billboard believed that the track's gradual rise to fame demonstrates Doja Cat's "innate ability" to produce hit singles and prolong the commercial success of her albums, "in an era where artists are moving between records faster than ever".

== Commercial performance and release ==
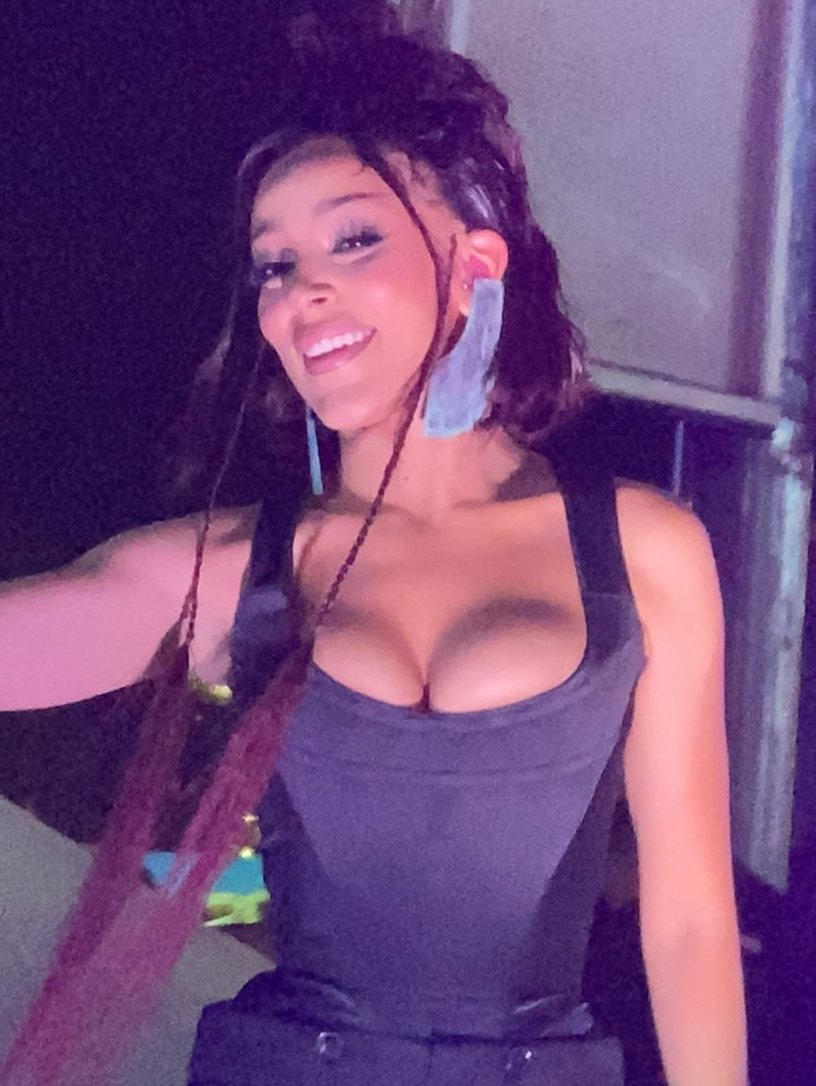
Doja Cat performing "Streets" in 2021. The song went viral on TikTok after three live performances of it were posted to YouTube during 2020.

"Streets" was a sleeper hit that gradually acquired Internet-driven success. It began to gain traction on social media platforms in the early days of 2021 after three live performances of the song, released to YouTube during the previous year, sparked interest in the track.

=== United States ===
In January 2021, "Streets" entered Billboard's Hot R&B/Hip-Hop Songs chart at number 26, where it would remain for 20 weeks. The same month, it debuted at number 18 on the chart's constituent Hot R&B Songs, spending 21 weeks there. "Streets" initially received a negligible amount of airplay; the song's chart performance was driven predominantly by streams and digital sales because of its online success. During the tracking week ending February 4, it accrued 4,000 downloads and 18.7 million streams in the United States, according to MRC Data. It reached its Hot R&B/Hip-Hop Songs peak on the week of February 13, at number 7. The event marked Doja Cat's second song to enter the chart's top 10 after "Say So" in 2020, which spent two weeks at number 1. By March, "Streets" peaked at number 3 on the Hot R&B Songs chart.

The track first appeared on the US Billboard Hot 100 chart during the week of January 23, debuting at number 91 and rising to number 39 the subsequent week. It jumped to number 25 on the chart issue dated February 6, 2021, with 16.1 million streams, 2,000 downloads, and 192,000 airplay audience impressions. (Note: Audience impressions refers to the number of audience members reached by a song on airplay from a radio station.) "Streets" climbed to number 18 during its fourth week on the Hot 100. With this, it became Doja Cat's second top 20 entry (as lead artist) on the chart after "Say So", which reached the top spot. Due to its boost in recognition, "Streets" was promoted to US contemporary hit radio stations on February 16, 2021. (Note: Billboard's Lipshutz writes that RCA had to consider releasing "Streets" to radio stations after the song became viral online: "In the meantime, RCA has to play catch-up with the radio strategy for 'Streets' following its unexpected success.") Subsequently, it became the seventh and final single from Hot Pink. By March, "Streets" had accumulated over 333 million streams and reached its Hot 100 peak at number 16. In 2024, it was certified 6× platinum by the RIAA.

=== Other markets ===
In Europe, "Streets" peaked within the top 20 of singles charts for Greece (2), Lithuania (4), Ireland (9), the United Kingdom (12), (Note: "Streets" peaked at number 12 on the UK Singles chart and at number 4 on the UK R&B Songs chart.) and Slovakia (15). It received a double platinum certification in the United Kingdom from the British Phonographic Industry (BPI), which denotes 1,200,000 certified units consisting of sales and on-demand streaming. "Streets" was Doja Cat's third biggest song in the country upon the release of her third studio album Planet Her (2021), having garnered 53.6 million UK streams at the time. It was also a top-40 chart entry in five other European territories, peaking at number 21 in Portugal, at number 23 in Iceland, at number 24 in Belgian Flanders, at number 27 in Switzerland, and at number 37 in Hungary. (Note: "Streets" peaked at number 37 on Hungary's Single Top 40 chart and at number 26 on the Stream Top 40 chart.) "Streets" was certified two-times platinum Poland, and platinum in Greece, and Portugal – in France, Italy, Spain, Sweden, and Switzerland, it received a gold certification.

The song also peaked within the top 20 of charts in New Zealand (10), Australia (12), and Canada (19); it was awarded platinum certifications in all three countries. Specifically, "Streets" was certified 4× platinum by Recorded Music NZ and by the Australian Recording Industry Association (ARIA), and 6× platinum by Music Canada. In Latin America, it received a triple diamond certification from Pro-Música Brasil (PMB) and a Diamond+2×Platinum+Gold certification from Asociación Mexicana de Productores de Fonogramas y Videogramas (AMPROFON).

=== International ===
"Streets" debuted at number 126 on the Billboard Global 200 during the week of January 23, 2021. It moved up to number 32 in its second charting week, before ascending to number 16 in its third. "Streets" was Doja Cat's first song to reach the Global 200's top 10, hitting its peak at number 8 during the week of February 13. In total, it spent 66 weeks in the chart.

Kemosabe and RCA made two remixes of "Streets" available to streaming services on March 12. One was by the electronic band Disclosure. The other was titled the "Silhouette Remix", which featured a sample of "Put Your Head on My Shoulder", the same Paul Anka song used for the Silhouette Challenge. A week after, an extended play was released for digital download and streaming. The tracklist includes the Disclosure version of "Streets" along with four other remixes by DJ Sliink, Lazerbeak, Party Favor, and Ape Drums.

== Music video ==
In the music video for "Streets", Doja Cat seduces a cab driver by performing her "epic version" of the Silhouette Challenge. (Note: The "epic version" quote is from Billboard's Heran Mamo.) Several critics labeled the video as erotic, horror-fantasy, and reminiscent of film noir.

A music video for "Streets", directed by Christian Breslauer, premiered via YouTube on March 9, 2021. Its release happened as Doja Cat was preparing to promote her then-upcoming third studio album, Planet Her. Jackson Langford of NME and Halle Kiefer of Vulture observed multiple tonally dark and "twisted" scenes present in the video, whereas Jessica McKinney of Complex used the word "sexy" to describe the scenes. Because it utilizes a combination of erotic and horror elements, Rolling Stone's Claire Shaffer summarized the music video as a "sultry [...] horror-fantasy".

The video begins with a shot of a male driver, played by Kofi Siriboe. While inside a cab on a heavily congested street, he notices Doja Cat posing as a mannequin by a shop window across the sidewalk. Similar to the TikTok mashup, the first few seconds of "Put Your Head on My Shoulder" begin to play. Upon the beat drop, Doja Cat, still in the shop window, performs the Silhouette Challenge. The lights suddenly change to a red color, and the music transitions from "Put Your Head on My Shoulder" to "Streets" as she dances to the beat, seducing the cab driver while doing so.

In the next scene, Doja Cat dances on top of a destroyed car's hood while the rain pours. A group of men, wearing white contact lenses, rise from the dead and form a crowd around her. The driver returns and approaches Doja Cat, but she ensnares and pulls him upwards using strings from a spider web. Dressed like a black widow, she climbs along the surface of a brick-wall building. On its walls lies the cab driver, trapped by the massive web that Doja Cat created.

Doja Cat is then seen on a living room couch, in a house near a nuclear testing site. She rests her head on the lap of a mannequin of what seems to be the cab driver. A bomb detonation happens nearby, which sets the living room on fire. During the video's conclusion, the driver is back inside his cab, and it is revealed that he imagined every prior event. Doja Cat is now shown as his cab's passenger.

=== Reception ===
Williams of Uproxx described the music video's spider imagery as a high-concept idea, which gave the impression that the video took months of preparation to generate viral popularity around "Streets". He emphasized, however, that it was posted after "Streets" was already popular online, and he argued that the premiere happened as an attempt to capitalize on the song's success. Jessica McKinney of Complex shared the same opinion: she thought that the video did "a great job of appealing to current social media trends". Heran Mamo, a staff writer for Billboard, found Doja Cat's iteration of the Silhouette Challenge to be "epic"; Slant Magazine's Eric Mason called the visuals "yet another fruit of the Doja-to-TikTok feedback loop".

McKinney included the video for "Streets" in a year-end list that ranked the best music videos of 2021, where she placed it at fourth place. She believed that, apart from taking advantage of the song's viral status, it successfully demonstrated Doja Cat's creativity. McKinney further argued that Doja Cat has had a history of releasing "the most innovative music videos in the industry right now" and cited the one for "Streets" as the latest example of such. Mason, and Dan Cairns and Jake Helm of The Sunday Times, also placed the video in their respective publications' year-end lists. Cairns and Helm described the video as "stunning" and compared its aesthetic to that of film noir media. Mason praised its cinematography and the "magnetic charisma" present in Doja Cat's performance.

== Live performances ==
A live performance of "Streets" was posted to YouTube on March 5, 2020, as part of video hosting service Vevo's Lift initiative, aimed at promoting up-and-coming artists to a wider audience. In it, Doja Cat sings the track as she wades in a massive tub of milk. Vevo partnered with her for Lift to increase her visibility through live performances that made use of "distinctive settings". The video's production team incorporated milk into the set design to evoke cat imagery, which they found appropriate given Doja Cat's name and image. According to the description for the video, the milk-filled stage ended up being Lift's "most ambitious studio build to date". Lynn Sharpe, in a HotNewHipHop article published during the release, believed that the live performance marked Doja Cat's "latest step toward world domination".

On December 24, 2020, Doja Cat's YouTube channel uploaded six performances of three different songs from Hot Pink to the platform. She created the series of videos, titled the Hot Pink Sessions, as a gesture of thanks to her fans for their support. Two of those performances were live renditions of "Streets".

After winning Best New Pop Artist at the 2021 iHeartRadio Music Awards, she performed the song again, as part of a medley that incorporated it with "Say So" and "Kiss Me More" featuring American singer SZA. The performance began with her standing in a cornfield, accompanied by backup dancers who donned gray latex alien costumes. Once the medley ended, Doja Cat was lifted off the stage while showered in rays of light, appearing to levitate towards an unidentified flying object above her. In 2022, she headlined for that year's Coachella festival, replacing Kanye West in the role. She included "Streets", among other songs from Hot Pink and Planet Her, in the setlist for her performance.

== Track listing ==
Digital download / streaming (Silhouette Remix)

1. "Streets (Silhouette Remix)" – 4:02

Digital download / streaming (Disclosure Remix)

1. "Streets (Disclosure Remix)" – 4:14

Target exclusive 4" vinyl single
Side A

1. "Kiss Me More" (featuring SZA) – 3:28

Side B

1. "Streets" – 3:46

Digital download / streaming (Remix EP)

1. "Streets (Disclosure Remix)" – 4:14
2. "Streets (DJ Sliink Remix)" – 2:13
3. "Streets (Lazerbeak Remix)" – 3:26
4. "Streets (Party Favor Remix)" – 3:20
5. "Streets (Ape Drums Remix)" – 2:55

== Credits and personnel ==
Credits adapted from the liner notes of Hot Pink.

Recording and management

- Engineered at Westlake Recording Studios (Los Angeles, California)
- Mastered at Bernie Grundman Mastering (Hollywood, California)
- Contains a sample from "Streets Is Callin'", written by Theron Otis Feemster, Christopher Jefferies and Demarie Sheki, as performed by B2K, published by Feemstro/Universal Music-Z Tunes LLC (ASCAP), Ole New Colorful Picture Music/Anthem Entertainment (ASCAP).

Personnel

- Doja Cat – vocals, songwriting
- Dominique Logan – songwriting, production for Blaq Tuxedo
- Darius Logan – songwriting, production for Blaq Tuxedo
- Lydia Asrat – songwriting
- David Sprecher – songwriting
- Theron Otis Feemster – songwriting
- Christopher Jefferies – songwriting
- Demarie Sheki – songwriting
- Rian Lewis – engineering
- Neal H Pogue – mixing
- Mike Bozzi – mastering

== Charts ==
=== Weekly charts ===
Weekly chart performance for "Streets"
Chart (2021)	Peak position
Australia (ARIA)	12
Austria (Ö3 Austria Top 40)	54
Belgium (Ultratip Bubbling Under Flanders)	24
Canada Hot 100 (Billboard)	19
Czech Republic Singles Digital (ČNS IFPI)	50
France (SNEP)	105
Germany (GfK)	99
Global 200 (Billboard)	8
Greece International (IFPI)	2
Hungary (Single Top 40)	37
Hungary (Stream Top 40)	26
Iceland (Tónlistinn)	23
Ireland (IRMA)	9
Lithuania (AGATA)	4
Netherlands (Single Top 100)	81
New Zealand (Recorded Music NZ)	10
Portugal (AFP)	21
Slovakia (Singles Digitál Top 100)	15
Sweden (Sverigetopplistan)	71
Switzerland (Schweizer Hitparade)	27
UK Singles (Official Charts)	12
UK Hip Hop/R&B (Official Charts)	4
US Billboard Hot 100	16
US Hot R&B/Hip-Hop Songs (Billboard)	7
US Rhythmic Airplay (Billboard)	31
US Rolling Stone Top 100	3

Weekly chart performance for "Streets (Disclosure Remix)"
Chart (2021)	Peak position
Belgium (Ultratip Bubbling Under Flanders)	22

=== Year-end charts ===
Year-end chart performance for "Streets"
Chart (2021)	Position
Australia (ARIA)	34
Canada (Canadian Hot 100)	73
Global 200 (Billboard)	36
Iceland (Tónlistinn)	92
New Zealand (Recorded Music NZ)	31
Portugal (AFP)	80
UK Singles (OCC)	50
US Billboard Hot 100	67
US Hot R&B/Hip-Hop Songs (Billboard)	31

== Certifications ==
Sales certifications for "Streets"
Region	Certification	Certified units/sales
Australia (ARIA)	4× Platinum	280,000^{‡}
Brazil (Pro-Música Brasil)	3× Diamond	480,000^{‡}
Canada (Music Canada)	6× Platinum	480,000^{‡}
Denmark (IFPI Danmark)	Gold	45,000^{‡}
France (SNEP)	Platinum	200,000^{‡}
Italy (FIMI)	Gold	50,000^{‡}
Mexico (AMPROFON)	Diamond+2× Platinum+Gold	1,050,000^{‡}
New Zealand (RMNZ)	4× Platinum	120,000^{‡}
Poland (ZPAV)	2× Platinum	100,000^{‡}
Portugal (AFP)	Platinum	10,000^{‡}
Spain (Promusicae)	Gold	30,000^{‡}
Switzerland (IFPI Switzerland)	Gold	10,000^{‡}
United Kingdom (BPI)	2× Platinum	1,200,000^{‡}
United States (RIAA)	6× Platinum	6,000,000^{‡}
Streaming
Greece (IFPI Greece)	Platinum	2,000,000^{†}
Sweden (GLF)	Gold	4,000,000^{†}
^{‡} Sales+streaming figures based on certification alone.^{†} Streaming-only figures based on certification alone.

== Release history ==
Release dates and formats for "Streets"
Region	Date	Format(s)	Version	Label(s)	Ref.
United States	February 16, 2021	Contemporary hit radio	Original	Kemosabe; RCA	
United States	February 23, 2021	Rhythmic contemporary radio	Original	Kemosabe; RCA	
Various	March 12, 2021	Digital download; streaming	Silhouette remix	Kemosabe; RCA	
Various	March 12, 2021	Digital download; streaming	Disclosure remix	Kemosabe; RCA	
Various	March 19, 2021	Digital download; streaming	Remix EP	Kemosabe; RCA	
United States	September 12, 2025	Target exclusive 4-inch vinyl	Original	Legacy	
