= Boss Bitch =

2020 single by Doja Cat

Single by Doja Cat

from the album Birds of Prey
- Released: January 23, 2020
- Genre: Electropop; electro hop; pop rap
- Length: 2:14
- Label: Atlantic
- Songwriters: Amala Zandile Dlamini; Ashton Casey; Sky Adams; Imad Royal
- Producers: Sky Adams; Imad Royal

Doja Cat singles chronology
"Say So" (2020)	"Boss Bitch" (2020)	"Like That" (2020)

Birds of Prey singles chronology
"Joke's on You" (2020)	"Boss Bitch" (2020)	"Sway with Me" (2020)

Music video
- "Boss Bitch" on YouTube

"Boss Bitch" is a song by American rapper and singer Doja Cat, featured on the Birds of Prey soundtrack for the film of the same name. It was released as the soundtrack's third single on January 23, 2020. The song was written by Doja Cat alongside Ashnikko and producers Sky Adams and Imad Royal.

== Composition ==
"Boss Bitch" is an "uptempo record" combined with a "poppy feel mixing layers of synths and cowbells". The lyrical content was described as a "fiery clapback at her haters". Doja Cat credited Ashnikko with writing the first verse and herself with writing the second.

== Critical reception ==
"Boss Bitch" was met with positive reviews from music critics. Patrick Johnson at Hypebeast described Doja's rendition as "a club-leaning single that features dubbing synths, unexpected cowbells and an undeniable chorus" and commented on her performance as "exuding the confidence and anti-good girl swagger of the film's protagonist Harley Quinn". James Dinh at iHeartRadio compared Doja's charisma to early Nicki Minaj with lyrics that "give the rising star more reason to gain attention", while Brendan Wetmore from Paper stated that the song was more reminiscent of Azealia Banks' "more bass-heavy works". As part of the soundtrack review, Jazz Tangcay of Vulture labeled the album opener as "declaratory" with a hook that exudes the singer's "bad-ass determination".

In June 2020, the song was listed as the 27th best song of 2020 so far by Billboard. NME named it the 12th best song of 2020 in December.

== Music video ==
Doja Cat posted pictures of herself at the video set in December 2019. The accompanying music video was released on January 23, 2020, and features previously unseen footage of the then-unreleased Birds of Prey, as well as shots of Doja Cat fighting off enemies and moving around a dance floor with Harley. Scenes featuring the singer were directed by Jack Begert, who also directed the videos for "Juicy" and "Cyber Sex".

== Credits and personnel ==
Credits adapted from Birds of Prey liner notes.

Recording

- Mixed and Mastered at Larrabee Sound Studios (North Hollywood, California)

Personnel

- Doja Cat – vocals, songwriting
- Ashton Casey – songwriting
- Sky Adams – songwriting; production
- Imad Royal – songwriting, production
- Manny Marroquin – mixing
- Emerson Mancini – mastering

== Charts ==
=== Weekly charts ===
Weekly chart performance
Chart (2020)	Peak position
Argentina (Argentina Hot 100)	83
Australia (ARIA)	17
Austria (Ö3 Austria Top 40)	23
Belgium (Ultratip Bubbling Under Flanders)	6
Belgium (Ultratip Bubbling Under Wallonia)	19
Canada (Canadian Hot 100)	27
Czech Republic (Singles Digitál Top 100)	6
Estonia (Eesti Tipp-40)	8
Finland (Suomen virallinen lista)	6
France (SNEP)	44
Germany (GfK)	31
Greece International (IFPI)	17
Global 200 (Billboard)	198
Hungary (Single Top 40)	17
Hungary (Stream Top 40)	8
Iceland (Tónlistinn)	16
Ireland (IRMA)	8
Italy (FIMI)	23
Japan (Japan Hot 100) (Billboard)	54
Latvia (LAIPA)	7
Lithuania (AGATA)	11
Netherlands (Single Top 100)	88
New Zealand (Recorded Music NZ)	27
Norway (VG-lista)	27
Portugal (AFP)	40
Scotland Singles (OCC)	50
Singapore (RIAS)	26
Slovakia (Singles Digitál Top 100)	9
Sweden (Sverigetopplistan)	57
Switzerland (Schweizer Hitparade)	28
UK Singles (OCC)	24
US Billboard Hot 100	100
US Hot R&B/Hip-Hop Songs (Billboard)	47

=== Year-end charts ===
Year-end chart performance
Chart (2020)	Position
Australia (ARIA)	71
Hungary (Stream Top 40)	51
Iceland (Tónlistinn)	91
Portugal (AFP)	191

== Certifications ==
Certifications
Region	Certification	Certified units/sales
Australia (ARIA)	Platinum	70,000^{‡}
Brazil (Pro-Música Brasil)	Platinum	40,000^{‡}
Denmark (IFPI Danmark)	Gold	45,000^{‡}
France (SNEP)	Platinum	200,000^{‡}
Italy (FIMI)	Platinum	70,000^{‡}
New Zealand (RMNZ)	2× Platinum	60,000^{‡}
Norway (IFPI Norway)	Gold	30,000^{‡}
Poland (ZPAV)	2× Platinum	40,000^{‡}
Portugal (AFP)	Gold	5,000^{‡}
Spain (PROMUSICAE)	Gold	30,000^{‡}
United Kingdom (BPI)	Platinum	600,000^{‡}
United States (RIAA)	2× Platinum	2,000,000^{‡}
Streaming
Japan (RIAJ)	Gold	50,000,000^{†}
^{‡} Sales+streaming figures based on certification alone.^{†} Streaming-only figures based on certification alone.

== Release history ==
Release dates and formats
Region	Date	Format(s)	Label	Ref.
Various	January 23, 2020	Digital download; streaming	Atlantic	
Italy	January 31, 2020	Radio airplay	Warner	
