= Hot Pink (album) =

2019 studio album by Doja Cat

Studio album by Doja Cat
- Released: November 7, 2019
- Recorded: 2018–2019
- Studios: Eightysevenfourteen (Los Angeles); Gold Diggers' Bar (Los Angeles); The Himalayas (Los Angeles); The Hive (Los Angeles); NightBird (Los Angeles); Sound Factory (Los Angeles); Westlake (Los Angeles); Hit Factory Criteria (Miami)
- Genres: Pop; hip-hop; R&B
- Length: 39:48
- Labels: Kemosabe; RCA
- Producers: Ari PenSmith; Ben Billions; Blaq Tuxedo; Doja Cat; Fallen; Johng Beats; Kool Kojak; Kurtis McKenzie; Mike Crook; P2J; Salaam Remi; Tizhimself; Troy NöKA; Tyson Trax; Yeti Beats

Doja Cat chronology
| Amala (2018) | Hot Pink (2019) | Planet Her (2021) |

Singles from Hot Pink
- 1. "Juicy" Released: August 16, 2019; 2. "Bottom Bitch" Released: October 4, 2019; 3. "Rules" Released: October 25, 2019; 4. "Cyber Sex" Released: November 7, 2019; 5. "Say So" Released: January 17, 2020; 6. "Like That" Released: May 12, 2020; 7. "Streets" Released: February 16, 2021

Hot Pink is the second studio album by American rapper and singer Doja Cat. It was released on November 7, 2019, by Kemosabe Records and RCA Records. A departure from the sound of her debut album Amala (2018), Hot Pink is a pop, hip-hop, and R&B record containing elements of funk and soul. The album features production from Doja herself, Yeti Beats, Tyson Trax, and others, with guest appearances from Smino, Gucci Mane, and Tyga.

The album received generally favorable reviews from music critics, who praised Hot Pink for its versatility and incorporation of various music genres. Hot Pink was famed for its longevity and ability to produce singles long after its release, spawning seven singles between 2019 and 2021. In 2020, "Say So" became Doja Cat's first number-one single on the Billboard Hot 100 after being remixed by rapper Nicki Minaj. In early 2021, "Streets" became a sleeper hit and entered the top 20 of the Hot 100 and the UK Singles Chart, as well as the top ten on the Billboard Global 200.

In May 2020, Hot Pink peaked at number nine on the US Billboard 200, becoming Doja Cat's first top 10 entry on the chart. It has been certified double platinum in the United States by the Recording Industry Association of America (RIAA). The album peaked in the top 40 of 12 other countries including the United Kingdom, Australia, Canada, Ireland, New Zealand, Sweden and Norway. It was nominated for Favorite Soul/R&B Album at the 2020 American Music Awards and Top R&B Album at the 2021 Billboard Music Awards.

== Background and conception ==
Doja Cat first achieved mainstream success as an internet "meme star" in August 2018 with the single "Mooo!". The consequent revival of material from her existing catalog earned Doja Cat her first two entries on the Billboard Hot 100, namely a 2019 remixed version of "Juicy" featuring Tyga, and "Candy". Doja Cat told the Los Angeles Times that she wanted Hot Pink to earn her more respect as a rapper. In March 2019, her debut album Amala (2018) was repackaged into a deluxe version featuring the solo version of "Juicy", as well as "Mooo!" and "Tia Tamera". Within the next two months, Doja Cat revealed that she was finishing up her next album, stating that she'd "never been this excited about an album in [her] life". Doja Cat revealed the album's title in July 2019, and began sharing minor details in subsequent interviews. One week before the official release of the album, Doja Cat hinted at the release of new music via Instagram. On November 2, 2019, she officially announced Hot Pink via her social networks. With this, Doja Cat also revealed its track listing and cover.

Doja Cat has frequently expressed disdain for her debut studio album Amala, stating that she believes it is not a "finished album" and that it does not entirely represent her as an artist. She has also stated that constantly partying and being under the influence of marijuana during its recording did not aid her in "perceiv[ing] what was going on musically". While recording Hot Pink, Doja Cat ceased to smoke marijuana and subsequently discovered that her songwriting improved significantly. She found that she had felt "more concise and clear and levelheaded." In an interview with Paper, she referred to Hot Pink as a firm restart for her career, and the most "refined, chiseled" representation of herself. Doja Cat's escapist fantasy worldview is reflected in the music by its upbeat production style. The record was inspired by some drastic lifestyle changes, and sees Doja Cat finally "coming into [her] own" and embracing her strengths as an artist. On the concept of the record, she said:

I named the album Hot Pink because I wanted people to feel that before they got into the music that it felt passionate, warm and welcoming. The color hot pink describes those things the most. It's my favorite color and has been for my whole life, so for my second project where I've found myself and I'm more refined, I felt that this title was the best choice.

However, in 2023 Doja Cat ended up describing the album, along with the following outing Planet Her, as "mediocre pop" and "a cash grab".

== Music and lyrics ==
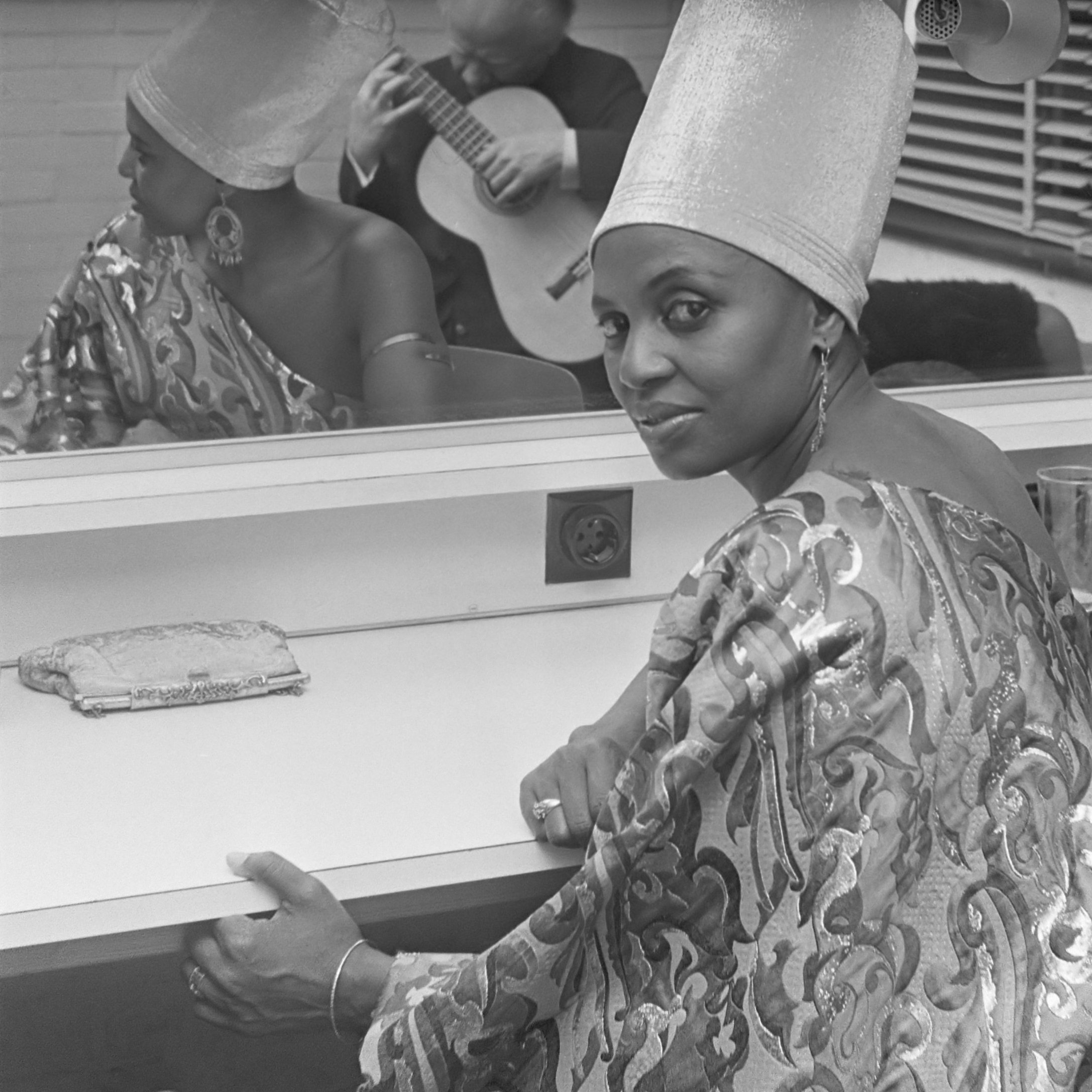
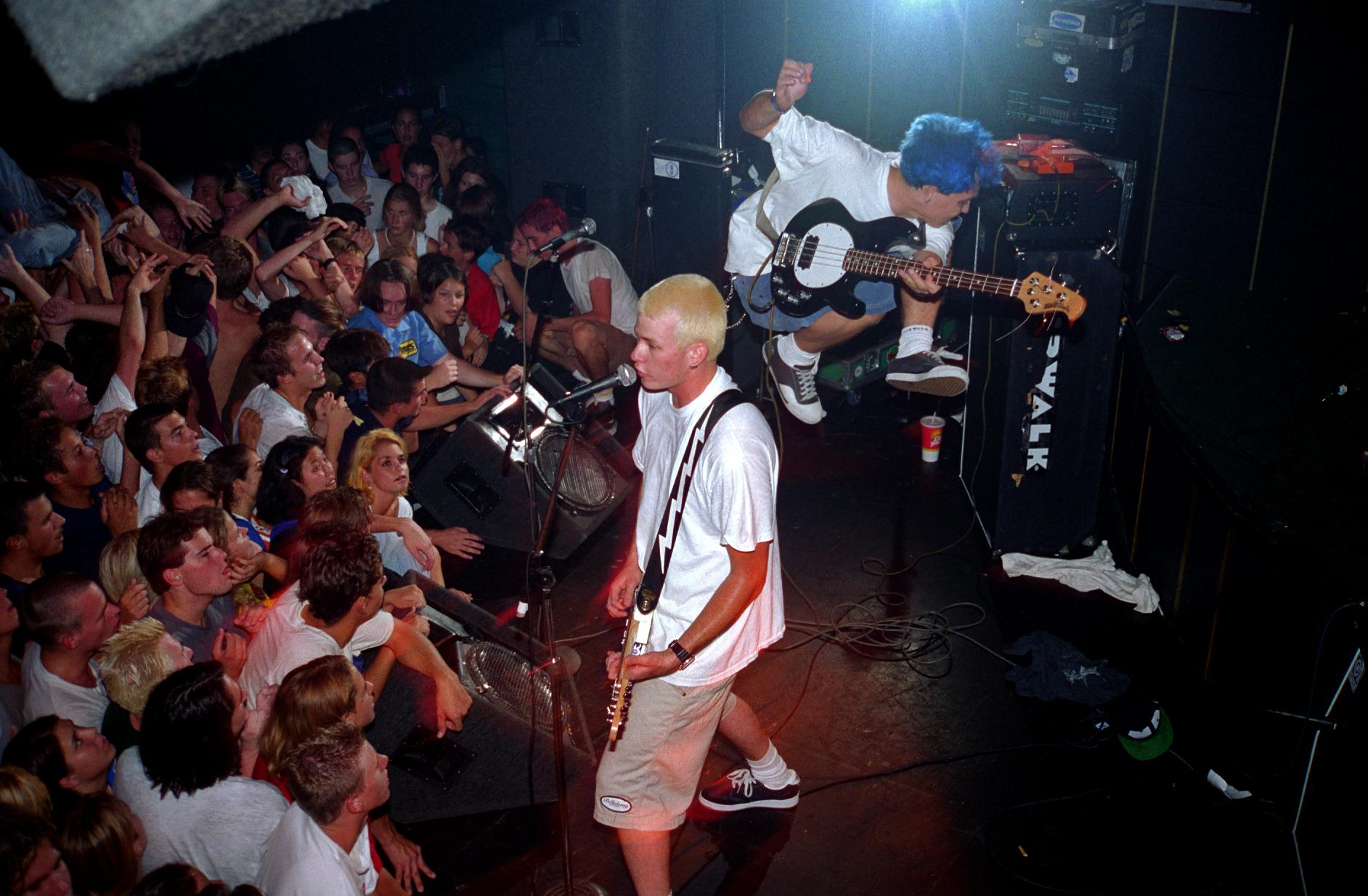
An illustration of the artists sampled on Hot Pink, "Won't Bite" samples the African song "My Angel (Malaika)" (1965) by Miriam Makeba (pictured left) and Harry Belafonte, while "Bottom Bitch" samples pop-punk song "What's My Age Again?" (1999) by Blink-182 (pictured right).

"Addiction"
NME described the eighth track, "Addiction", as a record containing "voguish '90s inspired R&B", one of the main musical styles explored throughout Hot Pink. Making use of synthesisers, the song borrows elements from disco and funk.

Hot Pink is a pop, hip-hop and R&B record, with songs varying widely in genre. The songs contain elements of rap-disco, electropop, pop-punk and emo rap. The album was praised for its versatility, genre fluidity, and quirky lyricism. Doja Cat's usage of double-entendres and declaratives in addition to frequent pop-culture references caused the record to be described as a witty, irreverent, transgressive encapsulation of her abilities. Joshua Espinoza of Complex noted that it "delivers everything fans love about Doja Cat: catchy beats, sex-positive messages, and a hefty dose of humor". On its influences and variety of genres, Doja Cat said: "Yeah, this album is a lot more African influenced. I can sample Blink-182 but put an African vocal sample in there. The whole song feels like you're in a tropical forest."

Hot Pink opens with "Cyber Sex", in which Doja Cat expresses her desires to engage in the titular virtual sex encounter. This is followed by the African-influenced song "Won't Bite" featuring Smino, which samples the song "My Angel (Malaika)" by Miriam Makeba and Harry Belafonte, and was "made with Donald Glover's handiwork in mind." A fully rap song in "Rules" follows, which Nerisha Penrose of Elle found to be influenced by Kendrick Lamar, with Doja Cat making statements such as "Said play with my pussy, but don't play my emotions". The fourth song, "Bottom Bitch" samples the 1999 Blink-182 song "What's My Age Again?" and was noted to have taken on a more punk approach to pop, while also being inspired by the punk rock and skating scene of Southern California. On the fifth track, "Say So", Doja Cat gives a nod to the 1970s, as she "seamlessly switches between floaty vocals and skilfully contained flows over a disco-inspired beat". It is followed by "Like That" featuring rapper Gucci Mane, an upbeat R&B, hip hop song.

Doja Cat described the seventh track, "Talk Dirty", as "angelic" and "heavenly". It is followed by the disco-influenced song "Addiction", which features "heavyweight synths", and "voguish '90s-inspired R&B". "Streets", the ninth track on the album, was described as a melancholy R&B ballad that sees Doja Cat "in her most serious form". This track is followed by "Shine", which was praised for its unique use of Auto-Tune and its "enchanting blend of rap and breathy lullaby". "Better Than Me", the eleventh track, was noted for "mix[ing] emo-rap with a sultry pop diva croon". The album closes with the remix of "Juicy", which contains guest vocals from rapper Tyga. It boasts a "fun, playful and devilishly flirtatious melody".

== Promotion ==
=== Singles ===
Over time, Hot Pink became known for its longevity and ability to produce singles long after its release, ultimately spawning seven singles and accompanying music videos from a total of the twelve tracks included on the album. A remixed version of the single "Juicy" featuring Tyga served as Hot Pink's lead single after being released on August 15, 2019, alongside an accompanying music video. Directed by Jack Begert, the remix's music video sees Doja Cat dressed in a number of food-inspired costumes such as a sliced watermelon, a cherry sundae, and a pitcher of lemonade. The remix debuted at number 83 on the US Billboard Hot 100, becoming Doja Cat's first career entry on the chart. Following the album's release in November 2019, it later re-entered the same chart at number 67. The song later reached a new peak of number 41 in February 2020, also peaking at number two on the Rhythmic chart.

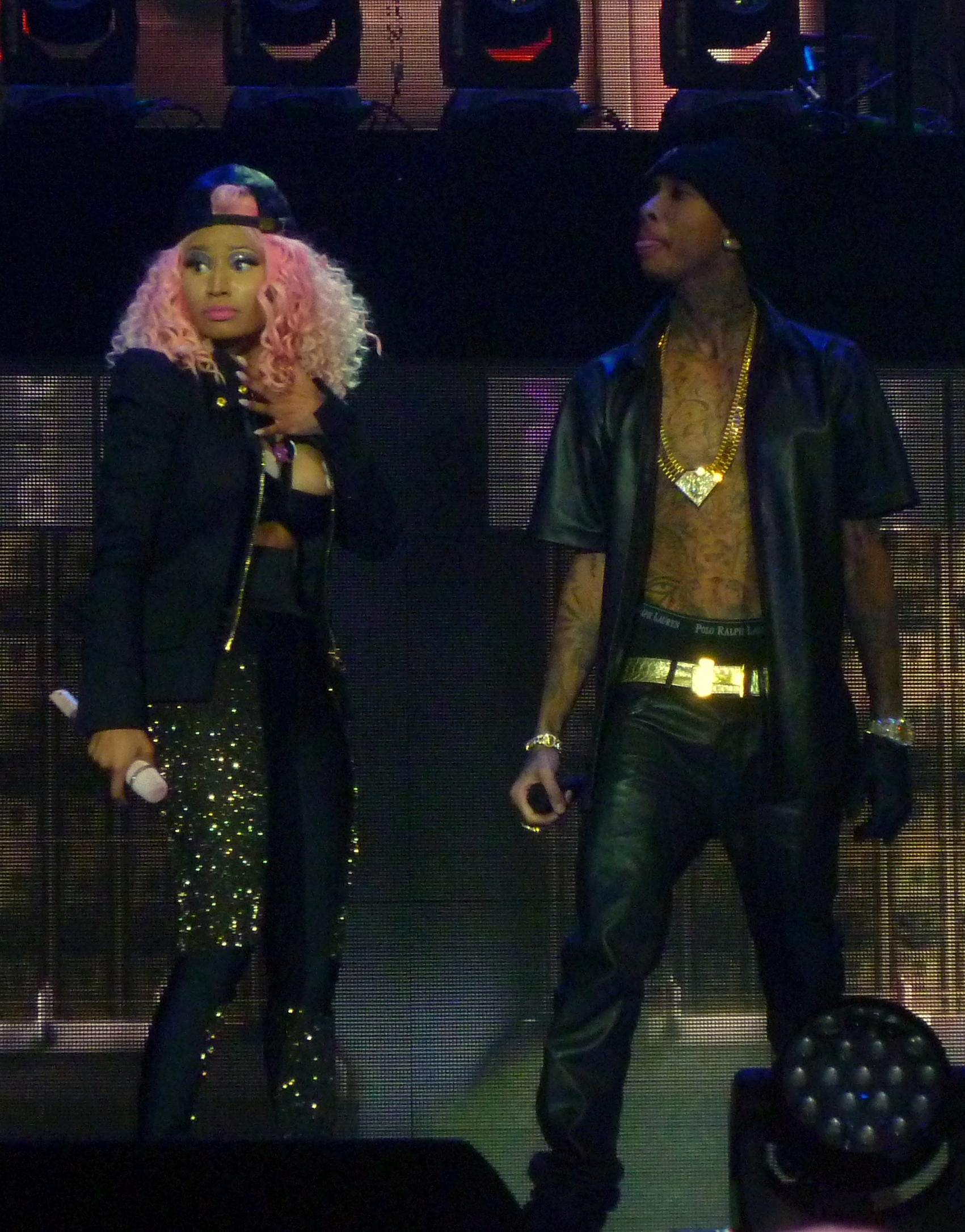
"Say So (Remix)" featuring Nicki Minaj (pictured left) topped the Billboard Hot 100, while "Juicy (Remix)" featuring Tyga (pictured right) peaked at number 41.

The second single from Hot Pink, titled "Bottom Bitch", was released on October 3, 2019. Its release coincided with that of its accompanying music video, which sported a "girl-power, [...] early-aughts pop-punk" aesthetic and featured a variety of "teenage hijinks" including skateboarding, egging, vandalism and pranking police officers. Coinciding with the official announcement of the album on social media, the album's third single, "Rules", was released on October 24, 2019, along with a music video in which Doja Cat portrays a reptilian mafia boss. The single reached number 19 on the Billboard Bubbling Under Hot 100 chart. The fourth single and music video, "Cyber Sex", were released on November 7, 2019, the same day as Hot Pink. "Cyber Sex" was certified gold by the Recording Industry Association of America in 2020.

Originally appearing as an album track on Hot Pink, "Say So" became a sleeper hit after gaining popularity on the social media platform TikTok, where a dance created by user Haley Sharpe went viral. Initially entering the Billboard Hot 100 at number 96 with no label promotion or radio airplay, it began to climb the charts after being sent to US contemporary hit radio and serviced as the fifth single from the album. This was followed by an accompanying music video on February 27, 2020, which features cameo appearances from Sharpe alongside fellow TikTok user Donté Colley. The song marked Doja Cat's first song to reach the top 20, and later the top 10 on the US Billboard Hot 100, with the solo original version reaching number five. Following the release of the remix featuring rapper Nicki Minaj, released on May 1, 2020, "Say So" reached number one on the Hot 100, becoming both Doja Cat's and Minaj's first number one single. The song was a top 10 hit in 28 other countries, including the United Kingdom, Canada, Australia, and New Zealand.

"Like That" featuring Gucci Mane was serviced as the sixth single from the album in early May 2020. The song was issued to rhythmic, contemporary hit, and urban contemporary radio formats throughout May 2020. A corresponding music video was released on June 25, 2020, and was described as "dreamy" and "intergalactic" while also being noted to channel Sailor Moon. In early 2021, an album track "Streets" became a sleeper hit after gaining popularity on TikTok where the corresponding #SilhouetteChallenge went viral. The song was pushed as the seventh single from Hot Pink after impacting contemporary hit radio in the United States in February. A corresponding music video directed by Christian Breslauer was released in early March 2021, starring American actor Kofi Siriboe as a taxi cab driver and Doja Cat as a display window mannequin as well as a reckless and seductive Spider-Man-like woman.

=== Tour and live performances ===
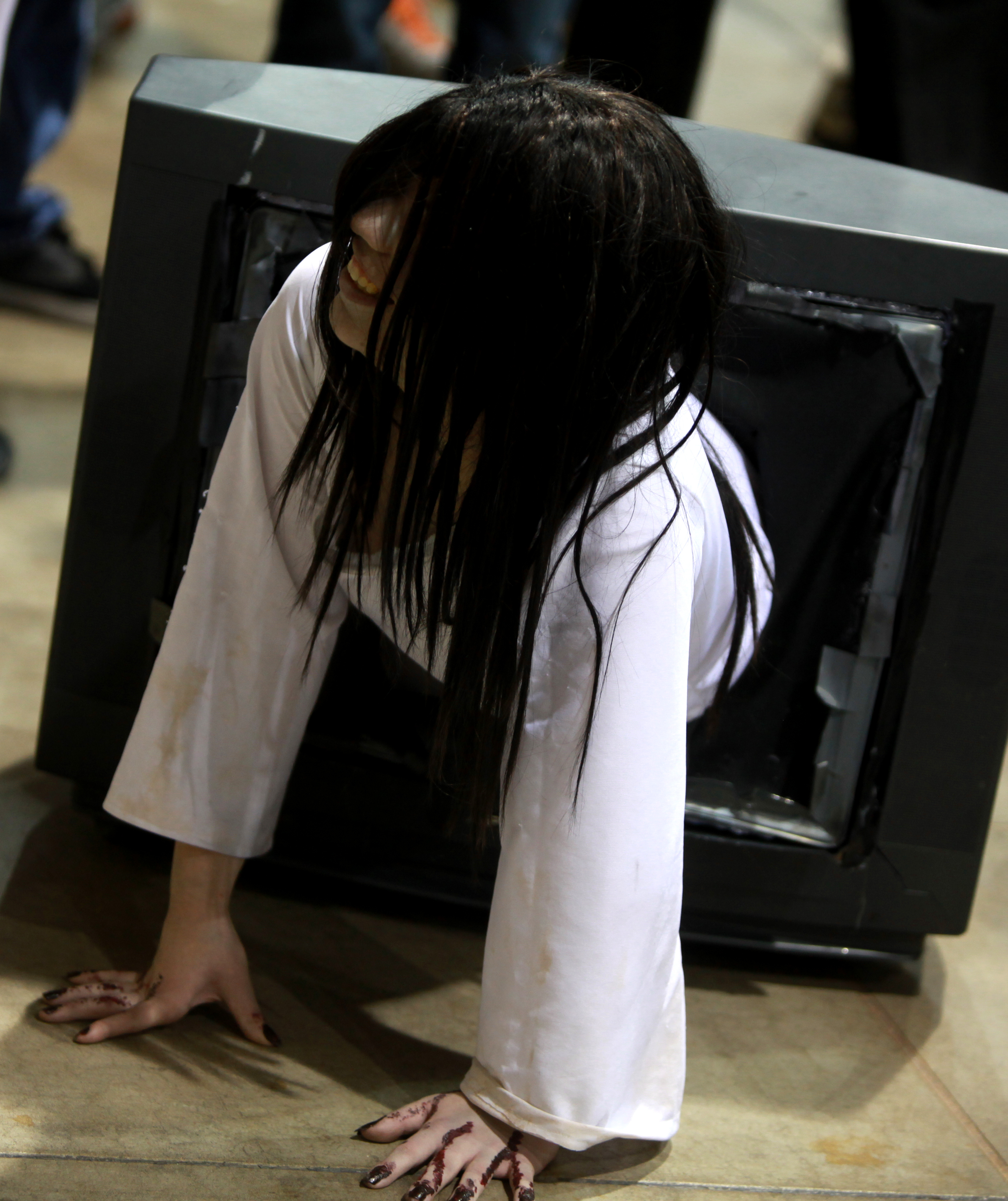
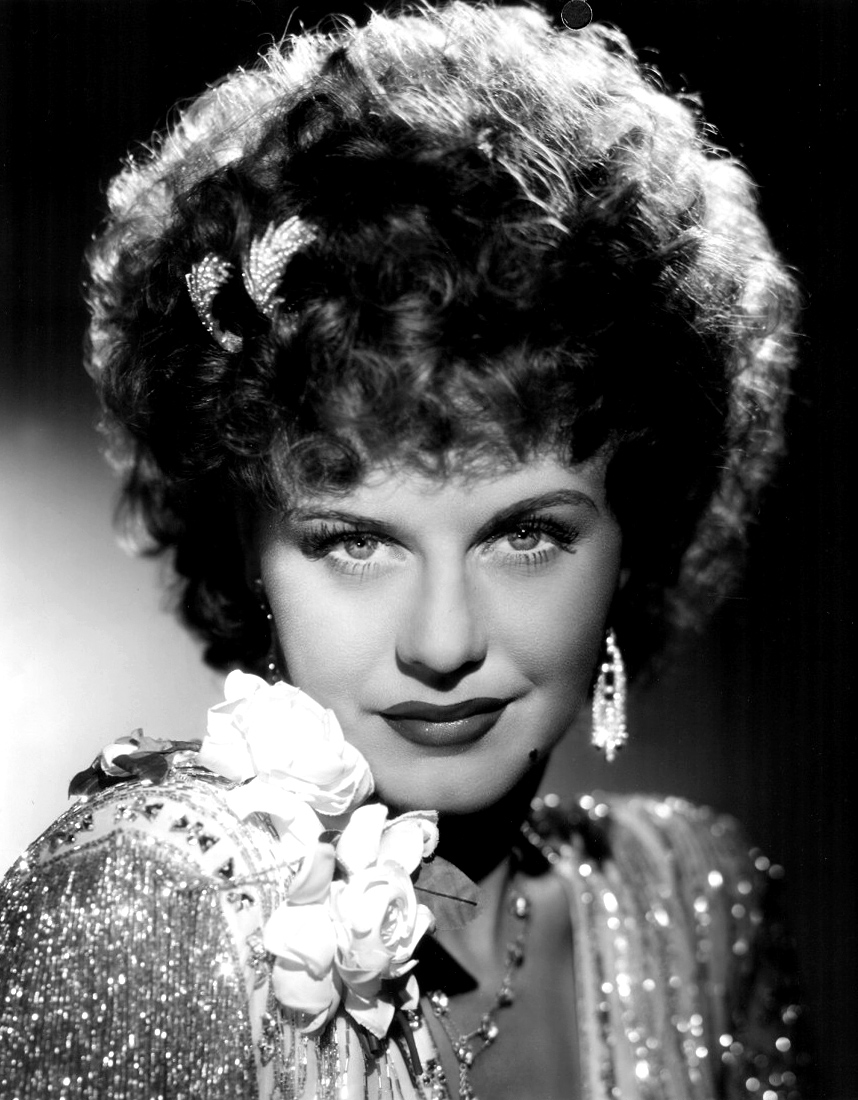
"Say So" was performed in various different styles throughout 2020. Her hard rock rendition of the song at the 2020 MTV EMAs was noted to channel The Ring (pictured left), while her broadway-style rendition at the 2020 BBMAs was likened to that of Roxie Hart (pictured right).

Doja Cat announced a concert tour of North American and Europe in support of the album, entitled the Hot Pink Tour, featuring support from rappers Ashnikko and BigKlit. Tickets for this tour sold out within ten minutes, yet it was postponed and later cancelled due to the COVID-19 pandemic.

Making her late night television debut, Doja Cat performed "Juicy" on Late Night with Seth Meyers with Tyga on November 12, 2019. At the 37th AVN Awards in late January 2020, she performed the songs "Cyber Sex" and "Juicy". In early December 2020, she performed "Rules" for Boiler Room's Energy segment in London, England. Doja Cat performed "Say So" for the first time on The Tonight Show Starring Jimmy Fallon in February 2020. In early March 2020, she performed "Streets" for Vevo's 2020 Lift campaign, with one writer calling it Doja Cat's "latest step toward world domination". In a new artist campaign organized by MTV titled Push, Doja Cat performed "Say So" and "Juicy" in April 2020. For a continuation of the Vevo Lift campaign, a live performance of "Say So" was uploaded to YouTube in May 2020. Doja Cat performed "Say So" on The Voice, wearing a pink '70s inspired costume and performed on top of a giant disco ball. She performed the song at the 2020 BBC Radio 1's Big Weekend 2020 a few days later. She performed it once again on The Late Late Show with James Corden in June 2020.

At the 2020 MTV Video Music Awards, Doja Cat performed a medley of "Say So" and "Like That", and also hinted at the Planet Her concept which would later feature in her third studio album. She also performed a Broadway-themed medley of "Say So", "Juicy" and "Like That" at the 2020 Billboard Music Awards. At the 2020 MTV Europe Music Awards, Doja Cat performed a hard rock version of "Say So" while referencing Samara Morgan from the horror film The Ring (2002). Australian guitarist Plini accused Doja Cat of using snippets from his 2016 song, "Handmade Cities" in this performance without his permission, however she shortly admitted to doing so by issuing an apology to him in the form of voice notes via Instagram private messages.

In December 2020, Doja Cat performed "Say So" at the 10th Streamy Awards. Doja Cat uploaded six videos on YouTube as a series dubbed the Hot Pink Sessions, which includes performances of "Talk Dirty", "Streets", and "Juicy". At iHeartRadio's 2020 Jingle Ball, Doja Cat performed "Say So" and "Juicy" as well as a cover of the song "Santa Baby" in late December 2020. She performed "Say So", "Like That" and "Juicy" at the annual Dick Clark's New Year's Rockin' Eve show. At the 63rd Annual Grammy Awards in March 2021, Doja Cat performed "Say So" for the last time.

== Critical reception ==
Professional ratings
Aggregate scores
| Source | Rating |
|---|---|
| Metacritic | 73/100 |
Review scores
| Source | Rating |
| AllMusic | 3.5/5 stars |
| Clash | 7/10 |
| Consequence of Sound | B− |
| NME | 4/5 stars |
| Pitchfork | 7.4/10 |
| RapReviews | 5/10 |
| Tom Hull – on the Web | B+ |

Hot Pink received generally positive reviews from music critics, with many praising its musical versatility, sex positivity, quirky lyricism, and genre variety. According to the review aggregator Metacritic, Hot Pink received "generally favorable reviews" based on a weighted average score of 73 out of 100 from 6 critic scores. Sandra Song of Paper summarized the record as "a witty, irreverent, transgressive encapsulation of [Doja Cat's] abilities", while Meaghan Garvey of Billboard called it "a playful, polished collection of freaky rap and R&B" and "a sultry, eccentric collection of genre-spanning bangers".

August Brown of the Los Angeles Times wrote that "The album sounds like how kids live now — endlessly referential, supremely confident in their sexual mores and yet laced with something like longing and a forced-on maturity." Reflecting on 2020 in music, Ben-Beaumont Thomas of The Guardian described the record as "superb" and wrote that Doja Cat's "facility with earworms has made her the darling of TikTok ". Jordan Bassett of NME wrote that Doja Cat is "taking no chances here and, now that the smoke's lifted, it's clear she's a pop contender with the nous and drive to go as far as she wants".

In a review for Consequence of Sound, Lucy Shanker opined that "[Hot Pink] serves as a testament to Doja's skill set: Her singing, rapping, and producing shine effortlessly on the record on tracks that range in genre and topic [...] There's no question that she's in control throughout the record, even as the format reveals some weaknesses." Lakin Starling of Pitchfork said that Doja's versatility is a "gift", and unlike Amala (2018), Hot Pink's sound does not feel "scattered" or "semi-rushed". Erin Bashford of Clash called it "an album that knows exactly what it is, [...] the work of a well-crafted hip pop star with something to prove".

=== Year-end lists ===
Hot Pink was included on multiple year-end lists. XXL included the album on its list of "50 of the Best Hip-Hop Projects in 2019". Vibe included Hot Pink on its list of "the 30 Best Albums of 2019". Complex listed the album at number 49 on its list of "the Best Albums of 2019". Kyle Rice of the Rolling Stone listed Hot Pink at number 7 on his list of the "10 Best Albums of 2019". NME listed Hot Pink at number 40 on its list of "the 50 best albums of 2019".

== Awards and nominations ==
Apart from the nominations received by Hot Pink itself, Doja Cat was selected as a candidate for Best New Artist as well as Record of the Year and Best Pop Solo Performance with "Say So" at the 63rd Annual Grammy Awards. Hot Pink and "Say So" also won Doja Cat "Best New Artist" awards at the 2020 American Music Awards, 2020 MTV Video Music Awards, 2021 NAACP Image Awards, 2020 MTV Europe Music Awards, 2020 People's Choice Awards, and 2020 NRJ Music Awards.

Awards and nominations for Hot Pink
| Year | Ceremony | Category | Result | Ref. |
|---|---|---|---|---|
| 2020 | American Music Awards | Favorite Soul/R&B Album | Nominated | |
| 2021 | Billboard Music Awards | Top R&B Album | Nominated | |
| 2021 | TEC Awards | Outstanding Creative Achievement – Record Production/Album | Nominated | |

== Commercial performance ==
Hot Pink was released on Thursday, November 7, 2019. This decision was considered unconventional, as Friday is often Global Release Day for new music. Consequently, Hot Pink debuted at number 93 on the US Billboard 200, selling 7,900 album-equivalent units. The next week, Hot Pink rose to number 19, earning 20,000 album-equivalent units. The album later reached a new peak of number nine on the US Billboard 200, as a result of "Say So" reaching number one on the Billboard Hot 100, selling 37,000 album-equivalent units. It became her first album to reach the top 10 on the chart.

Elsewhere, Hot Pink debuted at number 96 on the UK Albums Chart in mid November 2019, and later peaked at number 38 in March 2020. The album was certified gold for selling 100,000 album-equivalent units in the United Kingdom by the British Phonographic Industry in May 2021, and has spent over 35 weeks on the UK Albums Chart as of March 2021. Hot Pink also peaked in the top 20 in countries such as Canada, Australia, Ireland, New Zealand, the Netherlands, Denmark, Finland, and Sweden. It was also a top 10 hit in Norway, Iceland, and all three Baltic states. Hot Pink has also earned gold certifications in France, Singapore, and Sweden, platinum certifications in Australia and Denmark, multi-platinum certifications in Poland and New Zealand, and a diamond certification in Brazil.

In late 2020, Doja Cat was awarded with a number of certifications from the Recording Industry Association of America as part of their Class of 2020 program. Hot Pink was certified gold for having sold more than 500,000 album-equivalent units in the United States, while "Say So" was certified triple-platinum for selling three million units, "Juicy (Remix)" featuring Tyga was certified double-platinum for selling two million units, and "Like That" featuring Gucci Mane was certified platinum for selling one million units. "Rules" and "Cyber Sex" were also both certified gold for selling 500,000 units.

== Track listing ==
Credits adapted from album's liner notes and Tidal.

Hot Pink track listing
| No. | Title | Lyrics | Music | Producer(s) | Length |
|---|---|---|---|---|---|
| 1. | "Cyber Sex" | Amala Zandile Dlamini; Lydia Asrat | Gerard A. Powell II; Allan P. Grigg; David Sprecher | Kool Kojak; Tizhimself | 2:46 |
| 2. | "Won't Bite" (featuring Smino) | Dlamini; Christopher Smith, Jr. | Sprecher; Kurtis McKenzie; William Fadhili | McKenzie; Yeti Beats | 3:15 |
| 3. | "Rules" | Dlamini; Asrat; Theron Thomas | Ben Diehl; Salaam Remi; Lukasz Gottwald; Sprecher | Tyson Trax; Ben Billions; Remi | 3:07 |
| 4. | "Bottom Bitch" | Dlamini | Dlamini; Sprecher; Mark Hoppus; Tom DeLonge; Travis Barker | Doja Cat; Yeti Beats | 3:18 |
| 5. | "Say So" | Dlamini; Asrat | Gottwald | Trax | 3:58 |
| 6. | "Like That" (featuring Gucci Mane) | Dlamini; Radric Davis; Thomas; Asrat | Sprecher; Gottwald | Trax; Mike Crook | 2:43 |
| 7. | "Talk Dirty" | Dlamini; Asrat | McKenzie; Lee Stashenko; Sprecher | McKenzie; Fallen | 4:01 |
| 8. | "Addiction" | Dlamini | Richard Isong; Ariowa Irosogie; McKenzie; Sprecher | Ari PenSmith; P2J | 3:28 |
| 9. | "Streets" | Dlamini; Asrat | Dominique Logan; Darius Logan; Asrat; Sprecher; Theron Otis Feemster; Christopher Jefferies; Demarie Sheki | Blaq Tuxedo | 3:47 |
| 10. | "Shine" | Dlamini | Dlamini; Gottwald; Sprecher | Trax; Madmax | 2:40 |
| 11. | "Better than Me" | Dlamini; Asrat | Antwoine Collins; Sprecher | Troy Nöka; Johng Beats; Yeti Beats | 3:22 |
| 12. | "Juicy" (with Tyga) | Dlamini; Asrat; Micheal Ray Stevenson | Gottwald; Sprecher | Trax; Yeti Beats | 3:23 |
| Total length: | | | | | 39:48 |

Apple Music video deluxe edition bonus tracks and videos
| No. | Title | Writer(s) | Producer(s) | Length |
|---|---|---|---|---|
| 13. | "Say So" (featuring Nicki Minaj; original version) | Dlamini; Gottwald; Asrat; Onika Tanya Maraj-Petty | Trax | 3:26 |
| 14. | "Say So" (featuring Nicki Minaj) | Dlamini; Gottwald; Asrat; Maraj | Trax | 3:26 |
| 15. | "Say So" (Jax Jones Midnight Snack Remix) | Dlamini; Gottwald; Asrat | Trax; Jax Jones^{[a]} | 3:30 |
| 16. | "Say So" (Friend Within Remix) | Dlamini; Gottwald; Asrat | Trax; Friend Within^{[a]} | 2:52 |
| 17. | "Say So" (Snakehips Remix) | Dlamini; Gottwald; Asrat | Trax; Snakehips^{[a]} | 3:20 |
| 18. | "Streets" (Disclosure Remix) | Dlamini; Dominique Logan; Darius Logan; Asrat; Sprecher; Feemster; Jefferies; Sheki | Blaq Tuxedo; Disclosure^{[a]} | 4:14 |
| 19. | "Streets" (Silhouette Remix) | Dlamini; Dominique Logan; Darius Logan; Asrat; Sprecher; Feemster; Jefferies; Sheki; Paul Anka | Blaq Tuxedo | 4:02 |
| 20. | "Streets" (DJ Sliink Remix) | Dlamini; Dominique Logan; Darius Logan; Asrat; Sprecher; Feemster; Jefferies; Sheki | Blaq Tuxedo; DJ Sliink^{[a]} | 2:13 |
| 21. | "Streets" (Lazerbeak Remix) | Dlamini; Dominique Logan; Darius Logan; Asrat; Sprecher; Feemster; Jefferies; Sheki | Blaq Tuxedo; Lazerbeak^{[a]} | 3:26 |
| 22. | "Streets" (Ape Drums Remix) | Dlamini; Dominique Logan; Darius Logan; Asrat; Sprecher; Feemster; Jefferies; Sheki | Blaq Tuxedo; Ape Drums^{[a]} | 2:55 |
| 23. | "Streets" (Party Favor Remix) | Dlamini; Dominique Logan; Darius Logan; Asrat; Sprecher; Feemster; Jefferies; Sheki | Blaq Tuxedo; Party Favor^{[a]} | 3:20 |
| 24. | "Cyber Sex" (music video) | | | 3:01 |
| 25. | "Bottom Bitch" (music video) | | | 3:36 |
| 26. | "Juicy" (with Tyga; music video) | | | 3:18 |
| 27. | "Like That" (featuring Gucci Mane; music video) | | | 2:44 |
| 28. | "Rules" (music video) | | | 3:31 |
| 29. | "Say So" (music video) | | | 3:55 |
| 30. | "Streets" (music video) | | | 4:33 |
| Total length: | | | | 101:10 |

Notes

- ^{^[a]} signifies an additional producer
- ^{^[b]} signifies a co-producer
- The Japanese edition includes the bonus remix track "Say So" (Jax Jones Midnight Snack Remix), and four Amala tracks, "Mooo!", "Candy", "Go to Town", and "Tia Tamera".

Sampling credits

- "Won't Bite" contains a sample from "My Angel (Malaika)", as performed by Harry Belafonte and Miriam Makeba from their 1965 album An Evening with Belafonte/Makeba.
- "Bottom Bitch" contains a sample from "What's My Age Again?", written by Mark Hoppus and Tom DeLonge, as performed by Blink-182 from their album Enema of the State.
- "Streets" contains a sample from "Streets Is Callin'", written by Theron Otis Feemster, Christopher Jeffries and Demarie Sheki, as performed by B2K from their 2003 album You Got Served.
- "Mooo!" contains interpolations of "Milkshake", written by Pharrell Williams and Chad Hugo, as performed by Kelis from her 2003 album Tasty. This also contains interpolations of "Move Bitch", written by Craig Lawson, Bobby Sandimanie, Jonathan Smith and Michael Tyler, as performed by Ludacris from his 2001 album Word of Mouf.
- "Streets" (Silhouette Remix) contains a sample from "Put Your Head on My Shoulder", written and performed by Paul Anka, released in 1959.

== Personnel ==
Credits adapted from Tidal.

=== Performance ===
- Doja Cat – vocals
- Smino – vocals (track 2)
- Gucci Mane – vocals (track 6)
- Tyga – vocals (track 12)
- Chloe Angelides – background vocals (track 6)

=== Production ===
- Doja Cat – executive production, production (track 4)
- Dr. Luke – executive production, production (tracks 3, 5, 6, 10 and 12)
- Kool Kojak – production (track 1)
- Tiz Himself – production (track 1)
- Yeti Beats – production (tracks 1, 2, 4, 11 and 12)
- Kurtis McKenzie – production (tracks 2 and 7)
- Ben Billions – production (track 3)
- Salaam Remi – production (track 3)
- Mike Crook – production (track 6)
- Fallen – production (track 7)
- Ari PenSmith – production (track 8)
- P2J – production (track 8)
- Blaq Tuxedo – production (track 9)
- Johng Beats – production (track 11)
- Troy Nōka – production (track 11)
- CQ – additional production (track 12)
- Danielle Alvarez – additional production (tracks 3 and 12)

=== Technical ===
- Jaycen Joshua – mixing (track 1)
- Clint Gibbs – mixing (tracks 2–8, 10, 11 and 12)
- David Nakaji – mixing (track 4)
- Neal H. Pogue – mixing (tracks 9 and 11)
- Cheung – engineering (track 2)
- L10 Mixed It – engineering (track 2)
- Yeti Beats – engineering (track 2)
- Kelani Thompson – engineering (tracks 3 and 12)
- Emix – vocal engineering (track 6)
- DJ Riggins – engineering assistance (track 1)
- Jacob Richards – engineering assistance (track 1)
- Mike Seaberg – engineering assistance (track 1)
- Seth Ringo – engineering assistance (tracks 3 and 12)
- Tyler Sheppard – engineering assistance (tracks 3 and 12)
- John Bruington – engineering assistance (track 4)
- Mike Bozzi – mastering (tracks 1–9 and 10)
- MacGregor Leo – engineering (track 1)
- Rian Lewis – recording (track 1), engineering (tracks 2, 4, 6, 7–9 and 11)

== Charts ==
=== Weekly charts ===
Chart performance for Hot Pink
| Chart (2019–2024) | Peak position |
|---|---|
| Australian Albums (ARIA) | 19 |
| Austrian Albums (Ö3 Austria) | 57 |
| Belgian Albums (Ultratop Flanders) | 103 |
| Belgian Albums (Ultratop Wallonia) | 169 |
| Canadian Albums (Billboard) | 12 |
| Danish Albums (Hitlisten) | 13 |
| Dutch Albums (Album Top 100) | 12 |
| Estonian Albums (Eesti Ekspress) | 3 |
| Finnish Albums (Suomen virallinen lista) | 11 |
| French Albums (SNEP) | 51 |
| Icelandic Albums (Tónlistinn) | 7 |
| Irish Albums (Official Charts) | 31 |
| Italian Albums (FIMI) | 72 |
| Japanese Albums (Oricon) | 95 |
| Latvian Albums (LAIPA) | 6 |
| Lithuanian Albums (AGATA) | 3 |
| New Zealand Albums (RMNZ) | 20 |
| Norwegian Albums (VG-lista) | 8 |
| Portuguese Albums (AFP) | 199 |
| Swedish Albums (Sverigetopplistan) | 20 |
| UK Albums (Official Charts) | 38 |
| US Billboard 200 | 9 |
| US Top R&B/Hip-Hop Albums (Billboard) | 8 |
| US Indie Store Album Sales (Billboard) | 8 |

=== Year-end charts ===
2020 year-end chart performance for Hot Pink
| Chart (2020) | Position |
|---|---|
| Australian Albums (ARIA) | 51 |
| Canadian Albums (Billboard) | 35 |
| Danish Albums (Hitlisten) | 48 |
| Dutch Albums (Album Top 100) | 63 |
| French Albums (SNEP) | 174 |
| Icelandic Albums (Tónlistinn) | 37 |
| New Zealand Albums (RMNZ) | 32 |
| Swedish Albums (Sverigetopplistan) | 73 |
| UK Albums (OCC) | 96 |
| US Billboard 200 | 37 |
| US Top R&B/Hip-Hop Albums (Billboard) | 20 |

2021 year-end chart performance for Hot Pink
| Chart (2021) | Position |
|---|---|
| Australian Albums (ARIA) | 54 |
| Icelandic Albums (Tónlistinn) | 49 |
| US Billboard 200 | 44 |
| US Top R&B/Hip-Hop Albums (Billboard) | 27 |

2022 year-end chart performance for Hot Pink
| Chart (2022) | Position |
|---|---|
| Australian Albums (ARIA) | 86 |
| Lithuanian Albums (AGATA) | 61 |
| US Billboard 200 | 104 |
| US Top R&B/Hip-Hop Albums (Billboard) | 63 |

== Certifications ==
Certifications and sales for Hot Pink
| Region | Certification | Certified units/sales |
|---|---|---|
| Australia (ARIA) | Platinum | 70,000^{‡} |
| Austria (IFPI Austria) pink vinyl | Gold | 7,500^{‡} |
| Brazil (Pro-Música Brasil) | Diamond | 160,000^{‡} |
| Denmark (IFPI Danmark) | Platinum | 20,000^{‡} |
| France (SNEP) | Platinum | 100,000^{‡} |
| Italy (FIMI) | Gold | 25,000^{‡} |
| Mexico (AMPROFON) | 2× Platinum | 120,000^{‡} |
| New Zealand (RMNZ) | 3× Platinum | 45,000^{‡} |
| Poland (ZPAV) | 2× Platinum | 40,000^{‡} |
| Singapore (RIAS) | Gold | 5,000^{*} |
| Sweden (GLF) | Gold | 15,000^{‡} |
| United Kingdom (BPI) | Gold | 100,000^{‡} |
| United States (RIAA) | 2× Platinum | 2,000,000^{‡} |
^{*} Sales figures based on certification alone.^{‡} Sales+streaming figures based on certification alone.

== Release history ==
Release dates and formats for Hot Pink
| Region | Date | Format | Version | Label | Ref. |
|---|---|---|---|---|---|
| Various | November 7, 2019 | Digital download; streaming | Standard | Kemosabe; RCA | |
| Various | February 20, 2020 | LP | Standard | Kemosabe; RCA | |
| Japan | November 11, 2020 | CD; digital download; streaming | Japan | Sony Music | |
| Various | March 26, 2021 | Digital download; streaming | Video deluxe | Kemosabe; RCA | |
