= Like That (Doja Cat song) =

2020 single by Doja Cat

- "Say So / Like That (Mashup)" cover artwork

Single by Doja Cat featuring Gucci Mane

from the album Hot Pink
- Released: May 12, 2020
- Recorded: 2019
- Genre: Hip hop; pop rap
- Length: 2:45
- Label: Kemosabe; RCA
- Songwriters: Amala Zandile Dlamini; Lukasz Gottwald; Theron Thomas; Lydia Asrat; David Sprecher; Radric Davis; Mike Crook
- Producers: Tyson Trax; Mike Crook

Doja Cat singles chronology
"Boss Bitch" (2020)	"Like That" (2020)	"In Your Eyes" (remix) (2020)

Gucci Mane singles chronology
"Jingle Bales Intro" (2019)	"Like That" (2020)	"Both Sides" (2020)

Music video
- "Like That" on YouTube

"Like That" is a song by American rapper and singer Doja Cat featuring fellow American rapper Gucci Mane. It was written by both artists along with Theron Thomas, Lydia Asrat, David Sprecher, and producers Dr. Luke (credited as Tyson Trax) and Mike Crook. Originally included as a track on Doja Cat's second studio album Hot Pink (2019), it became a single on May 12, 2020, following a viral dance challenge using the song on the app TikTok.

Before "Like That" had become a single in May, the song had already begun to chart in several countries following the viral TikTok dance which used the song. Following its release as a single, the song peaked at number 50 on the US Billboard Hot 100. The music video was released on June 25, 2020. Doja Cat promoted the single with multiple live performances, including at the 2020 Video Music Awards, the Billboard Music Awards, and Dick Clark's New Year's Rockin' Eve.

== Background ==
On November 1, 2019, Doja Cat announced that her album Hot Pink would be released on November 8, 2019, and revealed the track listing alongside the album's release. The song "Like That" was confirmed to have a featured artist that would not be announced until the album's release, when it was revealed to be Gucci Mane. Similar to its predecessor "Say So", the song entered the charts before its single release due to a viral dance challenge using the song on the app TikTok. Consequently, "Like That" charted ahead of release as a single in the United Kingdom, Canada and Ireland.

== Music video ==
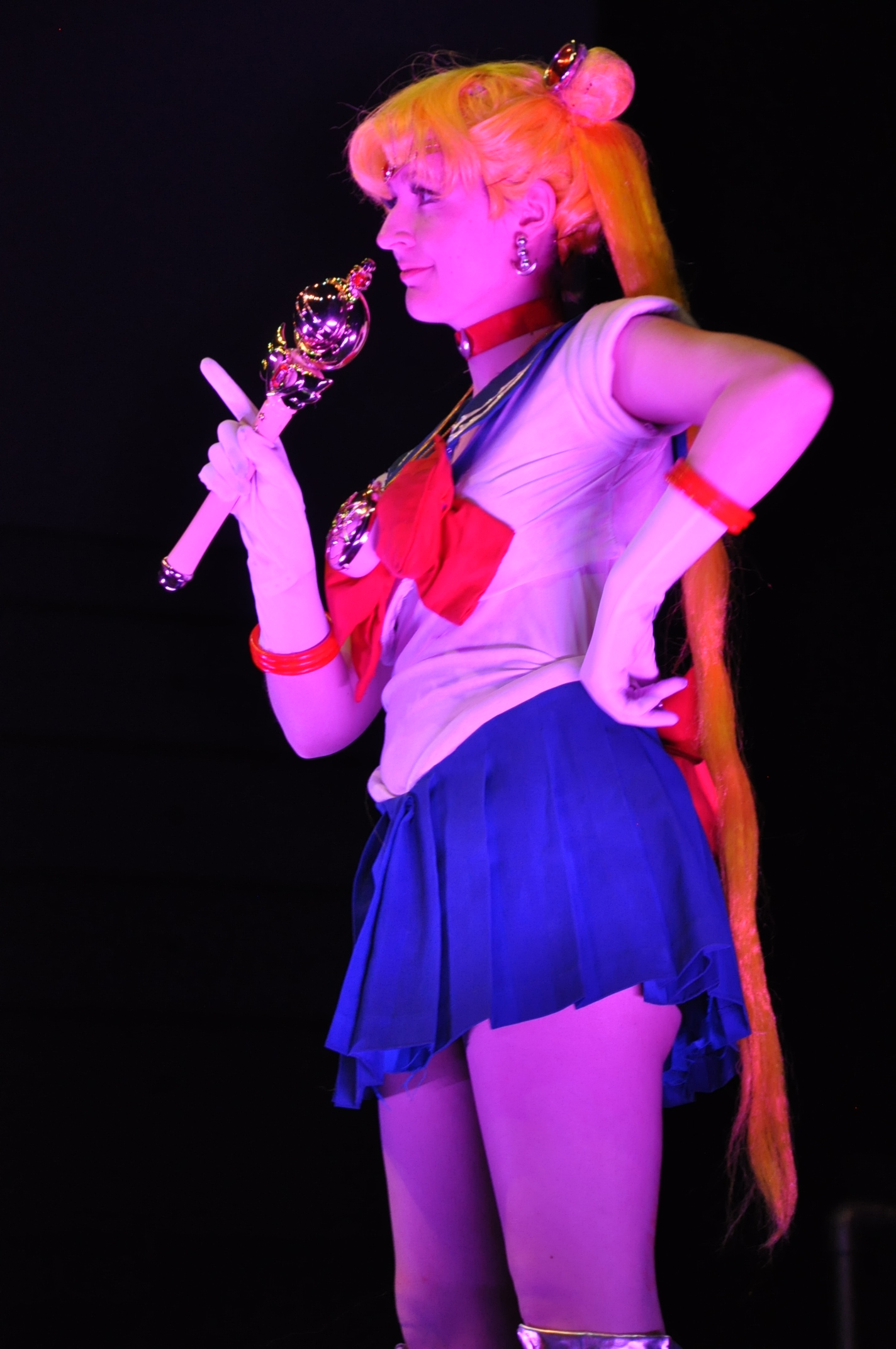
The music video for "Like That" drew comparisons to the Japanese animated series Sailor Moon (cosplay of the eponymous character pictured).

An accompanying music video for the song was filmed in Los Angeles before the state went on lockdown due to the COVID-19 pandemic. In May 2020, the video was leaked online via Twitter, generating controversy. On June 22, 2020, Doja confirmed that she was fully aware of the video leak and stated that the leaked video was not the official video and that the official video would be released soon. The official music video was released on June 25, 2020, and has over 200 million views on YouTube.

=== Synopsis ===
The video starts with the title card panning down to Doja Cat standing in a futuristic blue set among her backup dancers. Doja and the dancers start dancing, intercut with shots of an animated version of Cat, which sparked comparisons to the anime television series Sailor Moon. The video is plastered with animated graphics throughout the video. Doja Cat eventually meets up with collaborator Gucci Mane, who leans and poses in front of a convertible while rapping his verse of the song. Doja who is either dancing beside Mane or in the convertible takes back the song and ends the video with the splits on beat, followed by a black screen.

== Live performances ==
"Like That" was first performed in a medley with previous single, "Say So", at the 2020 MTV Video Music Awards. She also performed a medley of "Juicy", "Say So" and "Like That" at the 2020 Billboard Music Awards. She performed the song at Dick Clark's New Year's Rockin' Eve.

== Critical reception ==
Lakin Starling of Pitchfork wrote, "Doja weaves easily from rap mode into a whispery chorus with an upbeat R&B groove reminiscent of early-2000s Janet Jackson. It's the perfect soundtrack for a backyard party." Comparing the song's composition to that of songs that previously popularized on TikTok, Cat Zhang from the same publication wrote, "Doja's softer, girlier aesthetic offered an alternative to the vulgar, brutish rap that previously soundtracked the platform. And her brash, confident lyrics [...] offer snippets of female empowerment."

== Chart performance ==
Before "Like That" had become a single in May, the song had already begun to chart in several countries following the viral TikTok dance which used the song. Following its release as a single, the song peaked at number 50 on the US Billboard Hot 100, and charted in other territories such as Argentina and Australia. The song additionally appeared in three-year-end charts for the year of 2020 in the US: Hot R&B/Hip-Hop Songs, and the radio airplay charts Mainstream Top 40 and Rhythmic.

== Credits and personnel ==
Recording

- Gucci Mane's vocals engineered at Hit Factory Criteria (Miami, Florida)
- Mixed at Threejonet Studios (Los Angeles, California)
- Mastered at Bernie Grundman Mastering (Hollywood, California)

Personnel

- Doja Cat – vocals, songwriting
- Lukasz Gottwald – songwriting; production as Tyson Trax for Prescription Songs
- Theron Thomas – songwriting
- Lydia Asrat – songwriting
- David Sprecher – songwriting
- Gucci Mane – vocals, songwriting
- Emix – Gucci Mane's vocals engineering
- Chloe Angelides – additional vocals
- Clint Gibbs – mixing
- Mike Bozzi – mastering

Credits adapted from Hot Pink liner notes.

== Charts ==
=== Weekly charts ===
Weekly chart performance for "Like That"
Chart (2020)	Peak position
Argentina Hot 100 (Billboard)	90
Australia (ARIA)	67
Australia Hip Hop/R&B (ARIA)	31
Belgium (Ultratip Bubbling Under Wallonia)	19
Canada Hot 100 (Billboard)	29
Canada CHR/Top 40 (Billboard)	22
Canada Hot AC (Billboard)	38
El Salvador (Monitor Latino)	17
Global 200 (Billboard)	187
Ireland (IRMA)	50
Latvia (LAIPA)	89
Lithuania (AGATA)	92
Romania (Airplay 100)	71
UK Singles (Official Charts)	62
US Billboard Hot 100	50
US Dance Airplay (Billboard)	19
US Hot R&B/Hip-Hop Songs (Billboard)	18
US Pop Airplay (Billboard)	12
US Rhythmic Airplay (Billboard)	4
US Rolling Stone Top 100	72

=== Year-end charts ===
Year-end chart performance for "Like That"
Chart (2020)	Position
US Hot R&B/Hip-Hop Songs (Billboard)	55
US Mainstream Top 40 (Billboard)	41
US Rhythmic (Billboard)	19

== Certifications ==
Certifications for "Like That"
Region	Certification	Certified units/sales
Australia (ARIA)	2× Platinum	140,000^{‡}
Brazil (Pro-Música Brasil)	3× Platinum	120,000^{‡}
Canada (Music Canada)	3× Platinum	240,000^{‡}
France (SNEP)	Gold	100,000^{‡}
Mexico (AMPROFON)	Platinum+Gold	90,000^{‡}
New Zealand (RMNZ)	2× Platinum	60,000^{‡}
Poland (ZPAV)	Gold	25,000^{‡}
United Kingdom (BPI)	Gold	400,000^{‡}
United States (RIAA)	3× Platinum	3,000,000^{‡}
^{‡} Sales+streaming figures based on certification alone.

== Release history ==
Release dates and formats for "Like That"
Region	Date	Format(s)	Version	Label(s)	Ref.
United States	May 6, 2020 (Note: Release as a promotional single.)	Contemporary hit radio; rhythmic radio	Original	Kemosabe; RCA	
United States	May 12, 2020	Rhythmic radio	Original	Kemosabe; RCA	
Canada	May 18, 2020	Contemporary hit radio	Original	Sony	
United States	May 19, 2020	Contemporary hit radio	Original	Kemosabe; RCA	
United States	May 26, 2020	Urban contemporary	Original	Kemosabe; RCA	
Italy	July 24, 2020	Radio airplay	Original	Sony	
Various	September 11, 2020	Digital download; streaming	"Say So" / "Like That" mashup	Kemosabe; RCA	
