= Juicy (Doja Cat song) =

2019 song by Doja Cat

Song by Doja Cat

from the album Amala (Deluxe Edition)
- Released: March 1, 2019
- Studio: eightysevenfourteen studios (Los Angeles)
- Length: 3:22
- Label: Kemosabe; RCA
- Songwriters: Amala Zandile Dlamini; Lukasz Gottwald; David Sprecher; Lydia Asrat
- Producers: Tyson Trax; Yeti Beats

"Juicy" is a song recorded by American rapper and singer Doja Cat. It was included on the deluxe edition of her debut studio album Amala (2018), released on March 1, 2019. A remix version featuring American rapper Tyga was released as the lead single from her second studio album Hot Pink (2019) on August 15, 2019, through both Kemosabe Records and RCA Records. The song was written by Doja Cat, along with Lydia Asrat and producers Yeti Beats and Dr. Luke, under his pseudonym Tyson Trax. The song was recorded at eightysevenfourteen studios, based in Los Angeles.

Upon its release, the song was positively received by music critics, who praised the track for its meaning and sound. Commercially, "Juicy" was Doja Cat's first song to achieve significant commercial success, despite not being released as a single. The song has been awarded multiple certifications worldwide, including 4x Platinum in the United States from the Recording Industry Association of America (RIAA) and silver in the United Kingdom from the British Phonographic Industry (BPI).

== Background and release ==
"Juicy" was written by Doja Cat, David Sprecher and Lukasz Gottwald. The song was produced by Yeti Beats and Dr. Luke, with the latter also co-writing the song under the pseudonym Tyson Trax. The solo version of "Juicy" was initially included as a bonus track on the deluxe edition of Doja Cat's debut studio album, Amala, on March 1, 2019.

Doja Cat stated that she "had a clear picture in her head" of what she wanted the song to be about. "Sometimes, I can see my ass from the front", she told them. "So then I was like, if you can see it from the front, wait until you see it from the back. I thought that was the coolest thing in the world, the greatest hook ever." "Juicy" took less than one day to make. Doja Cat added that she was "proud of it", adding that she "knew people were going to like it, because [she] loved it".

== Live performances ==
Doja Cat performed the solo version of "Juicy" at the 2020 Billboard Music Awards, as part of a medley which also contained her 2020 singles "Like That" and "Say So". At the 2020 AVN Awards, Doja Cat performed "Juicy" along with "Cyber Sex". Doja Cat released two performances for the song to her YouTube channel in December 2020, as well as performances for her songs "Streets" and "Talk Dirty", as a Christmas gift to her fans.

== Reception ==
=== Critical response ===
Czar Van Gaal of V commented on the song, saying that "at first listen it may seem like a catchy song about the female anatomy but underneath the rump referencing rhymes lies a deeper meaning." Gaal added that "'Juicy' is Doja Cat at her finest." Vicky Inoyo of Earmilk called "Juicy" the best track on Amala, adding that the "beauty of the track lies in the lyric writing".

=== Commercial performance ===
Upon the release of Amala's deluxe edition, "Juicy" charted at number 68 on the ARIA Charts in Australia, where the song was certified 2× Platinum by the Australian Recording Industry Association (ARIA) for equivalent sales of 140,000 units in the country. It would later peak at number 35 on the Official Aotearoa Music Charts in New Zealand, where the song was certified 2× Platinum by Recorded Music New Zealand (RMNZ) for equivalent sales of 60,000 units in the country. The song was also certified Gold by Pro-Música Brasil (PMB) and the Polish Society of the Phonographic Industry (ZVAP) for equivalent sales of 20,000 and 10,000 units in their respective countries, despite not charting in either. Despite not charting in the United States, the song was certified 4× Platinum by the Recording Industry Association of America (RIAA) for equivalent sales of 4,000,000 units.

== Credits and personnel ==
Credits adapted from Amala liner notes

=== Recording and management ===
- Engineered and Mixed at eightysevenfourteen studios (Los Angeles, California)
- Mastered at Bernie Grundman Mastering (Hollywood, California)
- Doja Cat Music/Prescription Songs (BMI), Kasz Money Publishing (BMI), Yeti Yeti Yeti Music/WB Music Corp. (ASCAP), Desta Melodies (BMI)

=== Personnel ===
- Doja Cat – vocals, songwriting
- Lukasz Gottwald – songwriting; production for Prescription Songs, all programming, all instrumentation as Tyson Trax
- David Sprecher – songwriting, production, all programming, all instrumentation
- Lydia Asrat – songwriting
- Kalani Thompson – engineering
- Seth Ringo – assistant engineering
- Tyler Sheppard – assistant engineering
- Clint Gibbs – mixing
- Danielle Alvarez – production coordination
- Mike Bozzi – mastering

== Charts and certifications ==
=== Charts ===
Chart performance for "Juicy"
Chart (2019)	Peak position
Australia (ARIA)	68
New Zealand Hot Singles (RMNZ)	35

=== Certifications ===
Certifications for "Juicy"
Region	Certification	Certified units/sales
Australia (ARIA)	2× Platinum	140,000^{‡}
Brazil (Pro-Música Brasil)	Gold	20,000^{‡}
Canada (Music Canada)	3× Platinum	240,000^{‡}
New Zealand (RMNZ)	2× Platinum	60,000^{‡}
Poland (ZPAV)	Gold	10,000^{‡}
United States (RIAA)	4× Platinum	4,000,000^{‡}
^{‡} Sales+streaming figures based on certification alone.

== Tyga remix ==
"Juicy"

Single by Doja Cat and Tyga

from the album Hot Pink
- Released: August 15, 2019
- Studio: eightysevenfourteen studios (Los Angeles); Nightbird Studios (Los Angeles)
- Length: 3:22
- Label: Kemosabe; RCA
- Songwriters: Amala Zandile Dlamini; Lukasz Gottwald; David Sprecher; Lydia Asrat; Micheal Ray Stevenson
- Producers: Tyson Trax; Yeti Beats

Doja Cat singles chronology
"Tia Tamera" (2019)	"Juicy" (2019)	"Make That Cake" (2019)

Tyga singles chronology
"Loco Contigo" (2019)	"Juicy" (2019)	"Ayy Macarena" (2019)

Music video
- "Juicy" on YouTube

A remix of "Juicy" with American rapper Tyga was released on August 15, 2019. It is the lead single from Doja Cat's second studio album Hot Pink (2019). The remix was sent to rhythmic contemporary radio on September 10, 2019. Upon its release, the song received positive reviews from music critics, although Tyga's verse was criticized. Commercially, it entered charts in the United States, the United Kingdom, New Zealand, and Canada. Tyga is credited as an additional writer on this version.

=== Critical reception ===
Erin Bashford of Clash called the remix of "Juicy" the stand-out track of Hot Pink, remarking that "the song could be near-perfect if it wasn't for Tyga's verse, which feels unnatural". She criticized Tyga's ad-libs. Lucy Shanker of Consequence of Sound marked "Juicy" as one of the essential tracks of Hot Pink.

=== Commercial performance ===
==== United States of America ====
Upon the release of the remix of "Juicy", the single charted at number 83 on the Billboard Hot 100, before peaking at number 41 on the chart. By the end of 2020, the single was positioned at number 87 on the chart. the single also charted on four other Billboard charts. The single charted at number 18 on the Hot R&B/Hip-Hop Songs chart, number 33 on the Pop Airplay chart, number 10 on the R&B/Hip-Hop Airplay chart, and a peak at number 2 on the Rhythmic Airplay chart, its highest position on any chart it made. By the end of 2020, the single was positioned at number 44 on the Hot R&B/Hip-Hop Songs chart and number 20 on the Rhythmic Airplay chart. In addition, the song debuted at number 88 on the Rolling Stone Top 100 with 28,000 US streaming equivalent units (4.2 million streams).

==== Internationally ====
In Brazil, although the single did not chart, it was certified 2× Platinum by Pro-Música Brasil (PMB) for equivalent sales of 80,000 units in the country. In Canada, the single charted at number 57 on the Canadian Hot 100 and was certified Gold by Music Canada (MC) for equivalent sales of 40,000 units in the country. In France, the single charted at number 21 on the France Downloads chart, and was certified Gold by SNEP for equivalent sales of 100,000 units in the country.

In Mexico, although the single did not chart, it was certified Gold by the Asociación Mexicana de Productores de Fonogramas y Videogramas (AMPROFON) for equivalent sales of 30,000 units in the country. In New Zealand, the single charted at number 31 on the Official Aotearoa Music Charts. In the United Kingdom, the single charted at number 80 on the UK singles chart and was certified Gold by the British Phonographic Industry (BPI) for equivalent sales of 400,000 units in the country.

=== Music video ===
The music video for the remix of "Juicy" was released on the same day as the single. A "nod to the vibrant '90s-era music videos like 'Groove Is in the Heart'", it depicts Doja Cat dancing and twerking in multiple fruit-related scenes, while she wears custom fruit-inspired attire, including outfits based on watermelons, bananas, and cherries. The video was directed by Jack Begert. The cherry look for the video was designed by British hat designer Piers Atkinson. The lemon look was made by Bebe Aguirre, along with an accompanying hat for the outfit which was made by JimmyPaul. The grape-inspired look, a "ghost" bikini, was made by clothing designer Laina Rauma. The jacket which accompanies the bikini was made by designer Domminico. The watermelon outfit, a latex suit, was created by Los Angeles based designer Vex Latex. The shoes that accompany the watermelon outfit were made by British shoe designer Kira Goodey.

Soulbounce commented on the music video, saying that the video shows that Cat's "got the plumpest fruit of them all", additionally saying that "you can't deny that the song is quite the jam." Jasmine Hardy of Femestella positively reported on the music video, saying that "[Doja Cat's] care-free confidence and unapologetic attitude when it comes to her natural body are exactly what makes her a standout in the body positive movement."

=== Live performances ===
On November 11, 2019, Doja Cat and Tyga performed the remix of "Juicy" for Late Night with Seth Meyers. The performance features Doja Cat wearing a watermelon unitard and two backup dancers dressed as lemons.

=== Credits and personnel ===
Credits adapted from Hot Pink liner notes.

==== Recording and management ====
- Engineered and Mixed at eightysevenfourteen studios (Los Angeles, California)
- Tyga Vocals Recorded and Mixed at Nightbird Studios (Los Angeles, California)
- Mastered at Bernie Grundman Mastering (Hollywood, California)
- Doja Cat Music/Prescription Songs (BMI), Kasz Money Publishing (BMI), Yeti Yeti Yeti Music/WB Music Corp. (ASCAP), Desta Melodies (BMI), Tygaman Music/EMI Blackwood Music, Inc. (BMI)

==== Personnel ====
- Doja Cat – vocals, songwriting
- Lukasz Gottwald – songwriting; production for Prescription Songs, all programming, all instrumentation as Tyson Trax
- David Sprecher – songwriting, production, all programming, all instrumentation
- Lydia Asrat – songwriting
- Tyga – vocals, songwriting
- Kalani Thompson – engineering
- Seth Ringo – assistant engineering
- Tyler Sheppard – assistant engineering
- Christian "CG" Quinonez – Tyga's vocals recording, Tyga's vocals mixing
- Clint Gibbs – mixing
- Danielle Alvarez – production coordination
- Mike Bozzi – mastering

=== Charts ===
==== Weekly charts ====
Weekly chart performance of "Juicy" (Tyga remix)
Chart (2019–2020)	Peak position
Canada Hot 100 (Billboard)	57
France Downloads (SNEP)	21
New Zealand (Recorded Music NZ)	31
UK Singles (Official Charts)	80
US Billboard Hot 100	41
US Hot R&B/Hip-Hop Songs (Billboard)	18
US Pop Airplay (Billboard)	33
US R&B/Hip-Hop Airplay (Billboard)	10
US Rhythmic Airplay (Billboard)	2
US Rolling Stone Top 100	88

==== Year-end charts ====
Year-end chart performance of "Juicy" (Tyga remix)
Chart (2020)	Position
US Billboard Hot 100	87
US Hot R&B/Hip-Hop Songs (Billboard)	44
US Rhythmic (Billboard)	20

=== Certifications ===
Certifications for "Juicy" (Tyga remix)
Region	Certification	Certified units/sales
Brazil (Pro-Música Brasil)	2× Platinum	80,000^{‡}
Canada (Music Canada)	Gold	40,000^{‡}
France (SNEP)	Gold	100,000^{‡}
Mexico (AMPROFON)	Gold	30,000^{‡}
United Kingdom (BPI)	Gold	400,000^{‡}
^{‡} Sales+streaming figures based on certification alone.

== See also ==
- Cultural history of the buttocks
