= Rules (Doja Cat song) =

2019 single by Doja Cat

Single by Doja Cat

from the album Hot Pink
- Released: October 24, 2019
- Recorded: 2018
- Studio: Eightysevenfourteen (Los Angeles, California)
- Genre: Hip hop; pop rap
- Length: 3:07
- Label: Kemosabe; RCA
- Songwriters: Amala Zandile Dlamini; Ben Diehl; Salaam Remi; Lukasz Gottwald; Lydia Asrat; Theron Thomas; David Sprecher
- Producers: Ben Billions; Remi; Tyson Trax

Doja Cat singles chronology
"Bottom Bitch" (2019)	"Rules" (2019)	"Cyber Sex" (2019)

Music video
- "Rules" on YouTube

"Rules" is a song by American rapper and singer Doja Cat, released on October 24, 2019, as the third single from her second studio album Hot Pink (2019). The song was written by Doja Cat, Yeti Beats, Lydia Asrat, Uptown AP of R. City, and producers Salaam Remi, Tyson Trax, and Ben Billions. Soon after its release, the song became popular on Twitter, and Doja Cat's performance was noted to be influenced by Kendrick Lamar.

== Background ==
"Rules" was released as the third single from Doja Cat's second album Hot Pink as well as being the third track on the album. Doja Cat first teased the song by releasing a still from the music video on her Instagram account on October 16, 2019 as well as another shot from the video on October 22, 2019. The song was announced upon its release along with its music video premiere.

== Music video ==
On October 24, 2019, a music video was released alongside the song's release. Directed by Christian Sutton while video production was handled by Psycho Films, the video portrays Doja as the boss of a Cat Mafia gang with the video taking place in the desert.

== Critical reception ==
Lakin Starling of Pitchfork wrote, "[Rules] captures a more serious—though hardly humorless—mood, pairing eerie old-western bass with Doja's memorable command: 'Play with my pussy, but don't play with my emotions.'" Following the release of the song, Shaad D'Souza of The Fader placed the song on the 20 Best Pop Songs Right Now list admiring the "loose, funky production" as well as Doja's "charisma and charm".

Many publications, such as Elle and Pitchfork, praised "Rules" and cited the similarities of Doja Cat's lyrical delivery to those of Kendrick Lamar.

== Credits and personnel ==
Credits adapted from Hot Pink liner notes.

Recording

- Engineered at eightysevenfourteen studios (Los Angeles, California)
- Mixed at Threejonet Studios (Los Angeles, California)
- Mastered at Bernie Grundman Mastering (Hollywood, California)

Personnel

- Doja Cat – vocals, songwriting
- Ben Billions – songwriting, production, all programming, all instrumentation
- Salaam Remi – songwriting; production, all programming, all instrumentation
- Tyson Trax – songwriting; production, all programming, all instrumentation
- Lydia Asrat – songwriting
- Theron Thomas – songwriting
- David Sprecher – songwriting
- Kalani Thompson – engineering
- Seth Ringo – assistant engineering
- Tyler Sheppard – assistant engineering
- Clint Gibbs – mixing
- Danielle Alvarez – production coordination
- Mike Bozzi – mastering

== Charts ==
Chart performance for "Rules"
Chart (2019)	Peak position
New Zealand Hot Singles (RMNZ)	17
US Bubbling Under Hot 100 (Billboard)	19
US Bubbling Under R&B/Hip-Hop Singles (Billboard)	8
US R&B/Hip-Hop Digital Song Sales (Billboard)	25

== Certifications ==
Certifications for "Rules"
Region	Certification	Certified units/sales
Australia (ARIA)	Platinum	70,000^{‡}
Brazil (Pro-Música Brasil)	Diamond	160,000^{‡}
Canada (Music Canada)	2× Platinum	160,000^{‡}
New Zealand (RMNZ)	Platinum	30,000^{‡}
Poland (ZPAV)	Gold	25,000^{‡}
United Kingdom (BPI)	Gold	400,000^{‡}
United States (RIAA)	2× Platinum	2,000,000^{‡}
^{‡} Sales+streaming figures based on certification alone.

== Release history ==
Release dates and formats for "Rules"
Region	Date	Format(s)	Label(s)	Ref.
Various	October 24, 2019	Digital download; streaming	Kemosabe; RCA	
