= Cyber Sex =

2019 single by Doja Cat

Single by Doja Cat

from the album Hot Pink
- Released: November 7, 2019
- Recorded: 2019
- Studio: The Hive & Gold Diggers’ Studios (Los Angeles, California)
- Genre: Bubblegum rap
- Length: 2:46
- Label: Kemosabe; RCA
- Songwriters: Amala Zandile Dlamini; Gerard A. Powell II; Allan P. Grigg; Lydia Asrat; David Sprecher
- Producers: Kool Kojak; Tizhimself

Doja Cat singles chronology
"Rules" (2019)	"Cyber Sex" (2019)	"Say So" (2020)

"Cyber Sex" is a song by American rapper and singer Doja Cat. It was released alongside a music video through Kemosabe and RCA Records on November 7, 2019, as the fourth single from her second studio album Hot Pink, which was released on the same day. Written by Doja Cat, Yeti Beats and Lydia Asrat, the song was also produced by Kool Kojak alongside Tizhimself. It features "90s-esque synth-heavy bubblegum raps".

The song was popularized by internet meme personality "Queen of Brooklyn" on social media sites such as Twitter and TikTok. It was later certified gold by the Recording Industry Association of America in late November 2020.

== Music video ==
On November 7, 2019, a music video was released alongside the song. The video was directed by Jack Begert, produced by Psycho Films—including executive producer Sam Canter and producer Geenah Krisht—and commissioned by Sam Houston. It stars Doja Cat as a webcam model who becomes an engineer and genetically develops her ideal sexual partner.

== Live performance ==
Doja Cat was a musical guest at the 37th annual AVN Awards on January 25, 2020, where she performed "Cyber Sex" as well as "Juicy" in a nude mesh bodysuit with rhinestones covering and highlighting her nipples, butt, and pubic hair. Nylon magazine complimented the outfit calling it, "truly unforgettable".

== Credits and personnel ==
Credits adapted from Hot Pink liner notes.

Recording

- Recorded at The Hive & Gold Diggers’ Studios (Los Angeles, California)
- Mixed at Larrabee Sound Studios (North Hollywood, California)
- Mastered at Bernie Grundman Mastering (Hollywood, California)

Personnel

- Doja Cat – vocals, songwriting
- Tizhimself – songwriting, production
- Kool Kojak – songwriting, production
- Lydia Asrat – songwriting
- David Sprecher – songwriting
- Rian Lewis – recording
- MacGregor Leo – recording
- Jaycen Joshua – mixing
- Mike Seaberg – assistant mixing
- DJ Riggins – assistant mixing
- Mike Bozzi – mastering

== Charts ==
Chart performance for "Cyber Sex"
Chart (2019–2020)	Peak position
Ireland (IRMA)	92
New Zealand Hot Singles (RMNZ)	13
US Rolling Stone Trending 25	10

== Certifications ==
Certifications for "Cyber Sex"
Region	Certification	Certified units/sales
Australia (ARIA)	Platinum	70,000^{‡}
Brazil (Pro-Música Brasil)	Platinum	40,000^{‡}
Canada (Music Canada)	Platinum	80,000^{‡}
New Zealand (RMNZ)	Platinum	30,000^{‡}
United Kingdom (BPI)	Silver	200,000^{‡}
United States (RIAA)	Platinum	1,000,000^{‡}
^{‡} Sales+streaming figures based on certification alone.
