= The Scarlet Tour =

2023–2024 concert tour by Doja Cat

- Transcontinental tour by Doja Cat
- Location: Europe; North America
- Associated album: Scarlet
- Start date: October 31, 2023
- End date: July 14, 2024
- Legs: 2
- No. of shows: 46
- Supporting acts: Ice Spice; Doechii; Hemlocke Springs
- Attendance: 332,326 (27 shows)
- Box office: $40,754,809 (27 shows)
- Website: www.dojacat.com/tour/

Doja Cat concert chronology
- Amala Tour (2018–2019); The Scarlet Tour (2023–2024); Tour Ma Vie World Tour (2025–2026)

The Scarlet Tour was the second concert tour and debut arena tour by American rapper and singer Doja Cat, in support of her fourth studio album, Scarlet (2023). The supporting acts were American rappers Ice Spice and Doechii. The tour began on October 31, 2023, at Chase Center in San Francisco and concluded on July 14, 2024 at the Wireless Festival in London.

== Background ==
Following Doja Cat's first headlining tour, the Amala Tour, in support of her debut studio album Amala (2018), Doja Cat was scheduled to go on her second headlining tour, the Hot Pink Tour in support of her second studio album Hot Pink (2019). However, the tour was postponed and eventually canceled due to the COVID-19 pandemic. Doja Cat released her third studio album Planet Her in 2021, for the album she was scheduled as the opening act for the North American leg of The Weeknd’s After Hours til Dawn Tour and Festival Concert's in 2022, before she would pull out of the tour due to needing tonsil surgery.

On September 22, 2023, Doja Cat released her fourth studio album Scarlet. The album title was announced on August 30, 2023 as the same name of the tour's title, along with its album cover. On September 12, 2023, Doja Cat revealed the titles of the album's fifth-teen no feature tracks, making it her first project since her 2014 EP Purrr! with no features. Furthermore into the album's promotion, two singles were released in support of Scarlet: "Paint the Town Red" released on August 4, 2023 as the album's lead single, and "Agora Hills" released on September 22, 2023. Alongside with those, three promotional singles were released in support of Scarlet: "Attention" released on June 16, 2023, "Demons" released on September 1, 2023 and "Balut" released on September 15, 2023.

Just a week after the release of "Attention", On June 23, 2023, Doja Cat announced tour dates. Fan registration for the tour took place on June 25, followed by its presale three days later. Tickets went on sale on June 30 via Ticketmaster. On December 7, 2023, Doja Cat announced 2024 tour dates for the European leg, with tickets going on sale on December 14, 2023. Hemlocke Springs was the opening act for the European leg.

== Set list ==
=== 2023 ===
The following set list is obtained from the October 31, 2023 show in San Francisco. It is not intended to represent all dates throughout the tour.

Act I

1. "WYM Freestyle"
2. "Demons"
3. "Tia Tamera"
4. "Shutcho"
5. "Agora Hills"

Act II

6. "Attention"
7. "Often"
8. "Red Room" (Hiatus Kaiyote cover)
9. "Balut"
10. "Gun"
11. "Ain't Shit"

Act III

12. "Woman"
13. "Say So"
14. "Get Into It (Yuh)"
15. "Need to Know"
16. "Kiss Me More"

Act IV

17. "Paint the Town Red"
18. "Streets"
19. "Fuck the Girls (FTG)"

Act V

20. "97"
21. "Can't Wait"
22. "Go Off"
23. "Ouchies"

Encore

24. "Wet Vagina"

=== 2024 ===
The following set list is obtained from the June 11, 2024 show in Glasgow. It is not intended to represent all dates throughout the tour.

1. "Skull and Bones" (Intro)
2. "Acknowledge Me"
3. "Shutcho"
4. "WYM Freestyle"
5. "Demons"
6. "Tia Tamera"
7. "Gun"
8. "Piss"
9. "Okloser"
10. "Say So"
11. "Get Into It (Yuh)"
12. "Go Off"
13. "Attention"
14. "97"
15. "Balut"
16. "Need to Know"
17. "Masc"
18. "Often"
19. "Can't Wait"
20. "Agora Hills"
21. "Rules"
22. "Ain't Shit"
23. "Streets"
24. "Paint the Town Red"

Encore

25. "Wet Vagina"

== Tour dates ==
List of 2023 concerts, showing date, city, country, venue, opening acts, attendance and gross
Date (2023)	City	Country	Venue	Opening act(s)	Attendance	Gross
October 31	San Francisco	United States	Chase Center	Doechii	13,005 / 13,005	$1,779,450
November 2	Los Angeles	United States	Crypto.com Arena	Doechii	13,644 / 13,644	$1,772,191
November 3	Paradise (Note: Billed as Las Vegas in promotional material.)	United States	T-Mobile Arena	Doechii	14,342 / 14,342	$1,353,660
November 5	San Diego	United States	Viejas Arena	Doechii	8,371 / 8,371	$1,116,424
November 6	Anaheim	United States	Honda Center	Doechii	12,352 / 12,352	$1,735,191
November 8	Phoenix	United States	Footprint Center	Doechii	11,811 / 11,811	$1,824,572
November 10	Denver	United States	Ball Arena	Doechii	12,369 / 12,369	$1,223,789
November 13	Austin	United States	Moody Center	Doechii	11,433 / 11,433	$1,599,569
November 15	Houston	United States	Toyota Center	Doechii	11,771 / 11,771	$1,256,774
November 16	Dallas	United States	American Airlines Center	Doechii	12,570 / 12,570	$1,819,715
November 19	Atlanta	United States	State Farm Arena	Doechii	11,763 / 11,763	$1,646,469
November 21	Miami	United States	Kaseya Center	Ice Spice	12,177 / 12,177	$1,362,015
November 24	Tampa	United States	Amalie Arena	Doechii	12,346 / 12,346	$1,533,078
November 26	Charlotte	United States	Spectrum Center	Ice Spice	12,753 / 12,753	$1,396,556
November 27	Washington, D.C.	United States	Capital One Arena	Ice Spice	13,656 / 13,656	$2,022,106
November 29	Brooklyn	United States	Barclays Center	Ice Spice	14,199 / 14,199	$2,069,068
November 30	Newark	United States	Prudential Center	Ice Spice	11,389 / 11,389	$1,596,522
December 2	Boston	United States	TD Garden	Ice Spice	12,950 / 12,950	$2,050,960
December 4	Columbus	United States	Nationwide Arena	Ice Spice	10,149 / 11,625	$1,068,559
December 7	Minneapolis	United States	Target Center	Ice Spice	11,438 / 11,768	$1,111,014
December 8	Omaha	United States	CHI Health Center	Ice Spice	12,674 / 13,643	$1,124,987
December 10	Detroit	United States	Little Caesars Arena	Ice Spice	12,356 / 12,356	$1,149,867
December 11	Toronto	Canada	Scotiabank Arena	Ice Spice	14,668 / 14,668	$1,621,802
December 13	Chicago	United States	United Center	Ice Spice	13,198 / 13,198	$2,083,441

List of 2024 concerts, showing date, city, country, venue, opening acts, attendance and gross
Date (2024)	City	Country	Venue	Opening act(s)	Attendance	Gross
April 14 (Note: The concerts on April 14 and April 21, 2024, were part of the Coachella Valley Music and Arts Festival.)	Indio	United States	Empire Polo Club	—N/a	—N/a	—N/a
April 21	Indio	United States	Empire Polo Club	—N/a	—N/a	—N/a
June 1 (Note: The concert on June 1, 2024, was a part of Kiss Concert.)	Mansfield	United States	Xfinity Center	—N/a	—N/a	—N/a
June 2 (Note: The concert on June 2, 2024, was a part of Summer Jam.)	Elmont	United States	UBS Arena	—N/a	—N/a	—N/a
June 9 (Note: The concert on June 9, 2024, was a part of Parklife Festival.)	Manchester	England	Heaton Park	—N/a	—N/a	—N/a
June 11	Glasgow	Scotland	OVO Hydro	Hemlocke Springs	8,851 / 12,126	$950,401
June 12	Birmingham	England	Resorts World Arena	Hemlocke Springs	10,965 / 12,191	$1,204,629
June 14	London	England	The O_{2} Arena	Hemlocke Springs	—	—
June 15	Newcastle	England	Utilita Arena	Hemlocke Springs	—	—
June 17	London	England	The O_{2} Arena	Hemlocke Springs	—	—
June 19	Amsterdam	Netherlands	Ziggo Dome	Hemlocke Springs	—	—
June 21	Paris	France	Accor Arena	Hemlocke Springs	15,126 / 15,903	$1,282,000
June 23 (Note: The concert on June 23, 2024, was a part of Rock in Rio Lisboa.)	Lisbon	Portugal	Parque Tejo	—N/a	—N/a	—N/a
June 27 (Note: The concert on June 27, 2024, was a part of iDays Festival.)	Milan	Italy	Ippodromo Snai	—N/a	—N/a	—N/a
June 30 (Note: The concert on June 30, 2024, was a part of Longitude Festival.)	Dublin	Ireland	Marlay Park	—N/a	—N/a	—N/a
July 3 (Note: The concert on July 3, 2024, was a part of Roskilde Festival.)	Roskilde	Denmark	Dyrskuepladsen	—N/a	—N/a	—N/a
July 5 (Note: The concert on July 5, 2024, was a part of Open'er Festival.)	Gdynia	Poland	Gdynia-Kosakowo Airport	—N/a	—N/a	—N/a
July 10 (Note: The concert on July 10, 2024, was a part of Slottsfjell Festival.)	Tønsberg	Norway	Tønsberg Sentrum	—N/a	—N/a	—N/a
July 12 (Note: The concert on July 12, 2024, was a part of Les Ardentes.)	Liège	Belgium	Les Ardentes Festival	—N/a	—N/a	—N/a
July 14 (Note: The concert on July 14, 2024, was a part of Wireless Festival.)	London	England	Finsbury Park	—N/a	—N/a	—N/a
Total					332,326 / 340,378 (97.63%)	$40,754,809 (27 shows)

=== Cancelled concerts ===
List of cancelled concerts showing date, city, country, venue and reason
Date (2024)	City	Country	Venue	Reason
July 7 (Note: The concert on July 7, 2024, was set to be a part of STHLM Fields.)	Stockholm	Sweden	Gärdet	Unknown Reason
