= Scarlet (Doja Cat album) =

2023 studio album by Doja Cat

- Digital cover

Studio album by Doja Cat
- Released: September 22, 2023
- Recorded: May 2022 – August 2023
- Studio: Harbor Studios (Malibu)
- Genre: Hip-hop
- Length: 51:45
- Labels: Kemosabe; RCA
- Producers: Ayo the Producer; Bangs; Sam Barsh; Beat Butcha; Brad!; Boobie; Cadenza; Rogét Chahayed; Jean-Baptiste; D.A. Got That Dope; Serg Dior; DJ Replay; Earl on the Beat; Fallen; Flip_00; Gent!; Jasper Harris; London on da Track; Kurtis McKenzie; Sean Momberger; Ben Nartey; Presley Regier; Scribz Riley; Devon Rhys Roberts; Rubin; Aaron Shadrow; Jay Versace; Yeti Beats; Y2K

Doja Cat chronology
Planet Her (2021)	Scarlet (2023)	Vie (2025)

Alternative cover
- Scarlet 2 Claude cover

Singles from Scarlet
- 1. "Paint the Town Red" Released: August 4, 2023; 2. "Agora Hills" Released: October 31, 2023

Singles from Scarlet 2 Claude
- 1. "Okloser" Released: April 19, 2024

Scarlet is the fourth studio album by American rapper and singer Doja Cat. It was released through Kemosabe and RCA Records on September 22, 2023. Disillusioned with pop music and dissatisfied with music critics questioning her status as a rapper, Doja Cat felt inspired to create a "masculine" follow-up to her third studio album, Planet Her (2021). Her first project with no features since her debut extended play, Purrr! (2014), the record marks a departure from the pop-driven sounds of its predecessor, being predominantly centered around rapping.

Scarlet produced two singles. Its lead single, "Paint the Town Red", became a massive commercial success, and marked Doja Cat's first solo number-one on the US Billboard Hot 100, the UK Singles Chart, the Billboard Global 200, and several other national charts worldwide. It was followed by the top-ten single "Agora Hills". Promotional singles for the album include "Attention", "Demons", and "Balut".

Scarlet peaked at number four on the US Billboard 200, becoming Doja Cat's third top-ten entry on the chart. It received mostly positive reviews from critics, many of whom praised its production, lyrics, and versatility in comparison to her previous albums. To support the album, Doja Cat embarked on The Scarlet Tour, her first arena tour as a headliner. The album's reissue, titled Scarlet 2 Claude, was released on April 5, 2024, adding features from Teezo Touchdown and ASAP Rocky.

== Background ==
Doja Cat began her career as a rapper heavily involved with the underground scene in her hometown of Los Angeles. She rose to prominence as an internet meme, following the viral success of her novelty song, "Mooo!", released in August 2018. She continued to gain mainstream attention with her pop and R&B-infused second studio album, Hot Pink (2019). The remix to its standout single, "Say So" featuring Nicki Minaj, became the first song by a female rap duo to reach number one on the US Billboard Hot 100 chart. Doja Cat's third studio album, Planet Her (2021), continued the pop-R&B blend and was met with critical and commercial success. It became the most-streamed album by a female rapper on Spotify, and its lead single, "Kiss Me More" featuring SZA, won the Grammy Award for Best Pop Duo/Group Performance.

After being nominated for the BET Award for Best Female Hip Hop Artist in May 2021, Doja Cat was criticized by social media users who felt she was "too pop" to be considered as a rapper. She responded to the criticism on Twitter, by writing, "Don't ever fuckin [sic] disrespect me as a rapper. After the last song I dropped, you will respect my pen and that's fuckin [sic] that." She weighed in further on the debate during a cover story with Rolling Stone in December, saying, "Anyone who says that I'm not a rapper is in denial. They don't know what they're talking about." A few days after the profile piece was published, Doja Cat revealed on an Instagram livestream that she was interested in creating a double album; with one side focused on her pop rap sounds, and the other side containing 12 hip-hop songs produced by 9th Wonder and Jay Versace.

In an interview with Elle in May 2022, Doja Cat addressed claims that she was not a rapper in the "traditional sense" by stating that she has "rapped since the beginning, and I really couldn't even sing that well to begin with—I got a lot better. I use my voice as a tool to create these worlds, and it's fine if people think that I can't rap." She also confirmed that her upcoming fourth studio album will be "predominantly rap". She doubled down on the album's main genre in April 2023 by stating "no more pop", and that she agrees with "everyone who said the majority of my rap verses are mid and corny. I know they are. I wasn't trying to prove anything, I just enjoy making music. But I'm getting tired of hearing y'all say that I can't, so I will." Doja Cat also denounced her previous two albums as "cash grabs" and "digestible pop hits". On April 26, radio personality Ebro Darden shared that he had the opportunity to listen to approximately eight songs from the album while it was in its "early stages", stating "I heard straight rap records". After being asked about potential producers, he responded "I don't even think it's producers that we know. I think she's got her own batch of producers." In April 2023, while drafting the tracklist, she revealed the titles of several tracks that would later make the final cut. On August 27, she revealed that the album was finished, and she announced the release of the album three days later.

== Conception ==
=== Imagery ===
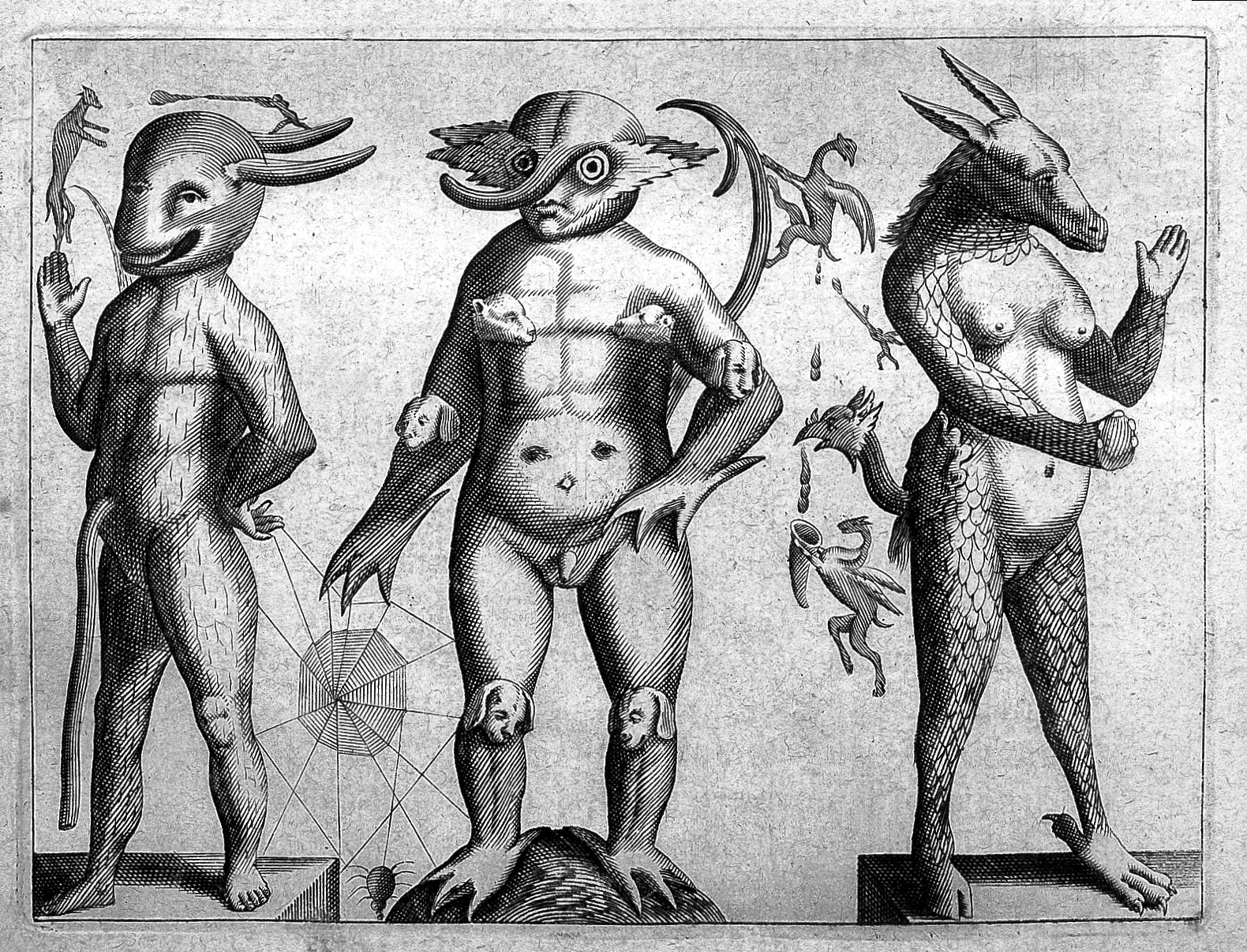
While recording the album, Doja Cat was heavily inspired by occult imagery, such as Fortunio Liceti's De monstris (1655).

Leading up to the album's release, Doja Cat adopted a darker aesthetic and image, claiming that she had "a lot of pent-up feelings and anger" which she wanted to express through beauty, further describing her new style as "punk", "experimental" and "manic". She initially shaved her hair and eyebrows, and then got a number of tattoos, including a creature from Fortunio Liceti's De monstris (1655) on her arm, a scythe surrounding her ear, and the skeleton of a bat on her back, which she claimed to symbolize a "new beginning". At times she also wore red contact lenses and blood-like makeup. She expressed similar imagery in the music video for singles "Attention" and "Paint the Town Red", the latter of which also depicted occult-like paintings by Doja Cat herself. These changes in her persona received criticism from some fans, who deemed these changes "demonic", and accused her of being a Satanist, and a member of the Illuminati. She was unbothered by these reactions, tweeting in February 2023 that she enjoyed "playing with people’s ignorance and stupidity for [her] own happiness and personal gain", and then in April 2023 addressed her fans in saying "Your fear is not my problem". Jason King of All Things Considered wrote that on Scarlet, Doja Cat "delights in playing the 'demon' her haters and fans accuse her of being."

=== Title ===
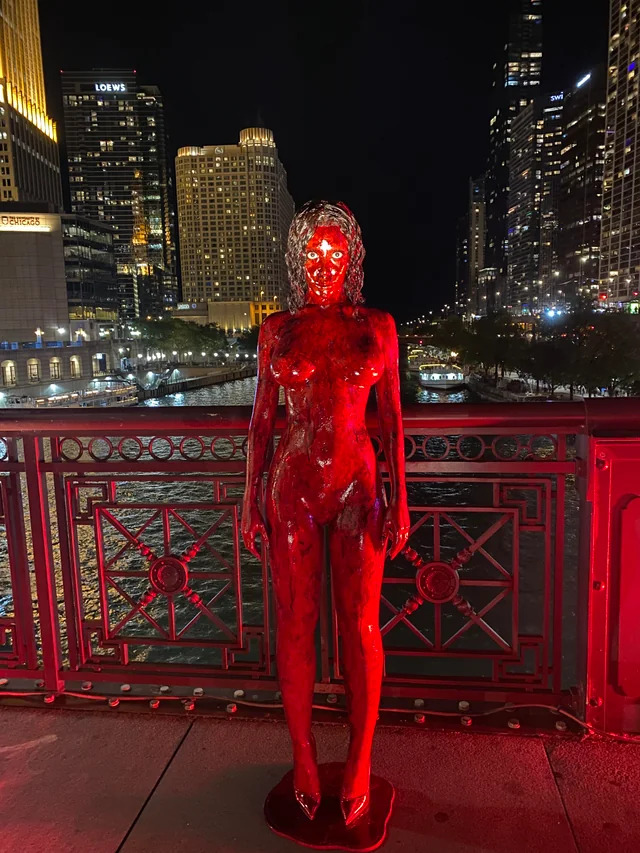
Scarlet wax figure on the Chicago Riverwalk.

Doja Cat shared a name for the album, Hellmouth, in March 2023. By April, she was unsure of whether or not the name would stick, and later clarified to Interview magazine that she did not have an album name yet, with the working title subject to potential change. While speaking to Time for their annual list of influential people, she shared that she "might just mess with everybody and completely turn the tables on them. But I like the idea of Hellmouth because it sounds good. And it's provocative." On May 9, she revealed another title, First of All, through social media, before retracting on May 15. In an interview with Business Insider on May 26, Doja Cat revealed that the reason she kept changing the title is due to a combination of indecisiveness and crowdsourcing. She described her process for selecting an album title as her putting her "ADHD kind of on display — by accident, I guess. I thought that Hellmouth was the name of the album, but then it wasn't. But I'm good at doing things last minute. So I've been firing off random stuff and reading comments and seeing how people receive it and then, you know, saying 'no' a lot. 'Just kidding'." She concluded by saying she thinks she finally has a name for the album, and swiftly added, "It's not First of All."

In an article for Harper's Bazaar, author Angie Martinez revealed the title to be Scarlet, on August 16, 2023. "Scarlet" is the name to an alter ego adopted by Doja Cat which symbolizes rebirth, "the reimagination of the self", and "the birth of a new creative, or new thought, or new way of style that you're expressing". After having tweeted "Scarlet is here" on June 16, the alter ego made her debut in the music video for "Attention" where she was seen in the nude and painted head-to-toe in red blood. Several wax figures of this Scarlet character began appearing in public locations around the United States, such as a subway station and Tompkins Square Park in New York City, and both Wrigley Field and Riverwalk in Chicago.

=== Artwork ===
On August 29, 2023, Doja Cat initially shared an album cover to Instagram which featured a painting of a big pinkish arachnid and a small drop of blood; containing no text. Fans then noticed that it looked almost identical to the cover for Of Gloom, the third studio album by German metalcore band Chaver, which was slated for release on the same day as Scarlet. Both covers were designed by American artist Dusty Ray, whom Chaver wrote had "been with [them] since [their] first album". Doja Cat then deleted the post from her Instagram the following day, while Chaver's post remained online and the band continued to promote the album with this cover. She revealed an "updated" cover the day after, which was also designed by Ray, featuring two pearlescent arachnids instead of the single pink arachnid. The original cover is the album's alternate art for its CD packaging.

Notably, Scarlet is the first Doja Cat album where she does not appear on the cover.

== Composition ==
During a cover story with Variety in February 2023, Doja Cat expressed that Scarlet will diverge from the "pink and soft things" and "pop and glittery sounds" that she has been noted for; opting instead for a more "masculine" sonic direction. She claimed to have purposefully misled journalists and fans into thinking that her album would be inspired by 1990s German rave music, rock, experimental jazz and R&B, rather than rap. However, it was later confirmed that the upcoming album would exclusively contain rap songs. She admitted that she had become tired of creating pop songs, adding that the genre is not exciting to her anymore. In an interview with Rolling Stone in June 2023, Doja expanded on the influences and inspiration for her upcoming album, saying that she had been reconnecting with the music that she was raised listening to, such as Erykah Badu, John Coltrane and 90s hip-hop. Doja Cat explained that "Attention", "Paint the Town Red", and "Demons" were all written during a period before she recorded the rest of Scarlet in Malibu, California within the space of ten days, noting that the songs recorded during the second period are very different in nature.

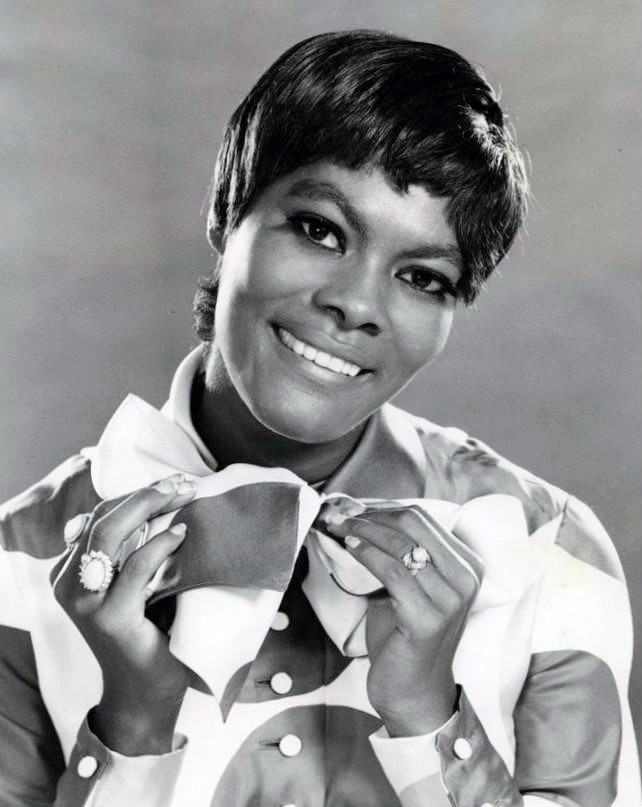
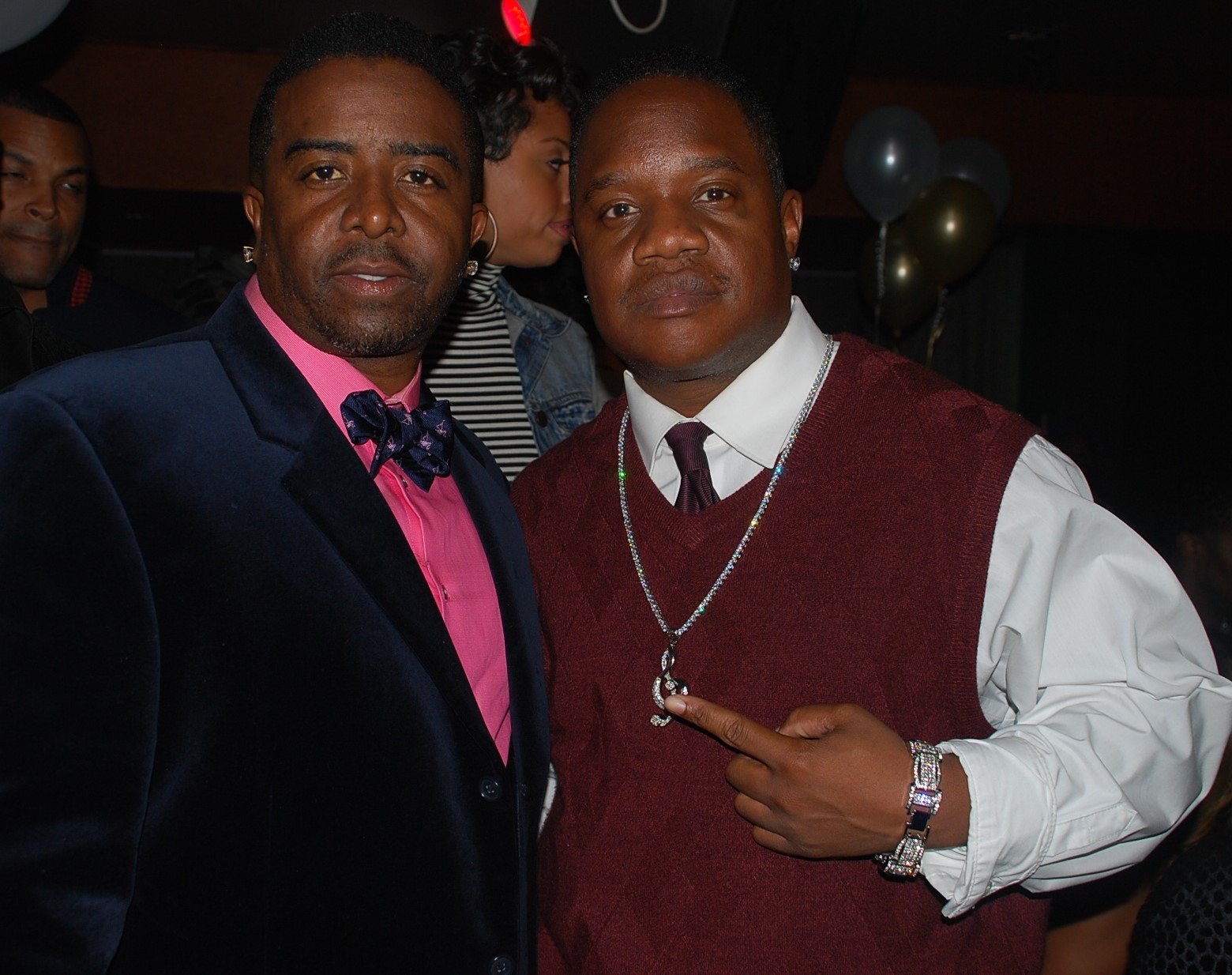
"Paint the Town Red" and "Agora Hills" sample "Walk On By" and "All I Do Is Think of You", by Dionne Warwick (left) and Troop (right), respectively.

The standard edition of Scarlet opens with "Paint the Town Red," a boom bap song where Doja asserts her stance as a performer against critics and fans. Sampling Dionne Warwick's version of "Walk On By," the song lambasts her detractors as she "refuses to settle for the disrespect she faces and will say whatever is necessary to prove that she is indestructible." The following song, "Demons," is a horrorcore trap song in which Doja coyly acknowledges the demonic accusations, rapping in a "clipped baby voice." The third track "Wet Vagina" is a rage rap song where Doja juxtaposes her possession of wealth and luxury clothing with references to nudity and sexuality, such as her "brand-new chest" with a "tongue-in-cheek delivery [that] also recalls the humor of prime Ludacris in the way that it adds a more nuanced sense of performance to her rapping." The fourth track is "Fuck the Girls (FTG)", a rapped track that has been characterized as "'90s hip-hop with the slinkiness of 2010s trap," sees Doja opine on the misogyny prevalent in hip-hop, responsible for the constant comparisons and competitions between female rappers. The track has also been cited as a dismissal of fans that exacerbate said misogyny and "all the malice towards women in stan culture." "Ouchies" sees Doja get more threatening with her critics, issuing confrontations with the "cadence of street fighter video games." "97" follows as the sixth track, with Doja continuing the theme of indifference towards pressure from others as she raps about "flaunting luxury and extravagance without care for societal judgment." "Gun" continues the album's aggressive motif, where Doja refers to her partner's penis as a gun and lyrically opting for firearm metaphors, asking her partner to "let the trigger spray" and "shoot it... with a silencer" with other women who may appear as competition. "Go Off" is more laid-back song encouraging confidence and self-empowerment amidst the opinions and beliefs of the self by others.

"Agora Hills" is an R&B-style song with ethereal instrumentation above a trap beat. Sampling "All I Do Is Think of You," Doja raps with a "valley girl accent" about her unabashed desire to physically indulge in her love with her partner, regardless of ever-present spectators. The ninth and transitional track of the standard album, as the aggression and materialism of the first half of the track are replaced with intimacy and introspection.

== Release and promotion ==
=== Singles ===
"Paint the Town Red", the lead single of Scarlet, was released on August 4, 2023, to commercial success. The song became her first solo single to top the Billboard Global 200, as well as the US Billboard Hot 100, the UK Singles Chart, the Canadian Hot 100, and national charts in several other countries such as Australia, Ireland, and New Zealand.

"Agora Hills" followed as the second and final single, released in tandem with Scarlet on September 22, 2023. Its music video was co-directed by Doja Cat and Hannah Lux Davis. It reached the top 10 on the Billboard Hot 100.

Three promotional singles preceded the album's release as well. The first, "Attention", was released on June 16, 2023, alongside an accompanying music video directed by Tanu Muino. It reached the top 40 in Australia, the United States, and the United Kingdom. It was followed by "Demons" on September 1, 2023 alongside a music video co-directed by Christian Breslauer and Doja Cat and co-starring American actress Christina Ricci; the trailer first premiered at Cinespia in Los Angeles on August 27. "Balut" was released as the third promotional single on September 15, 2023.

=== Tour and live performances ===
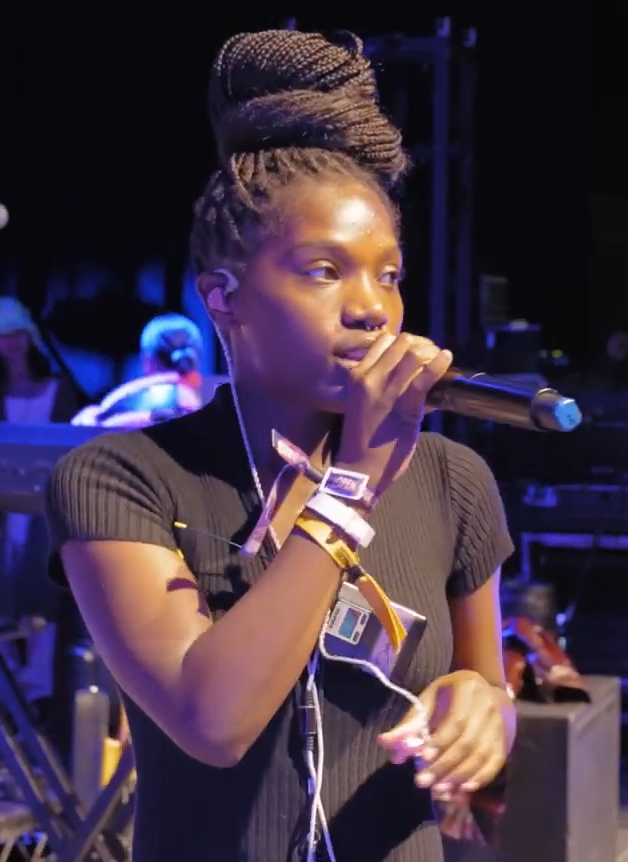
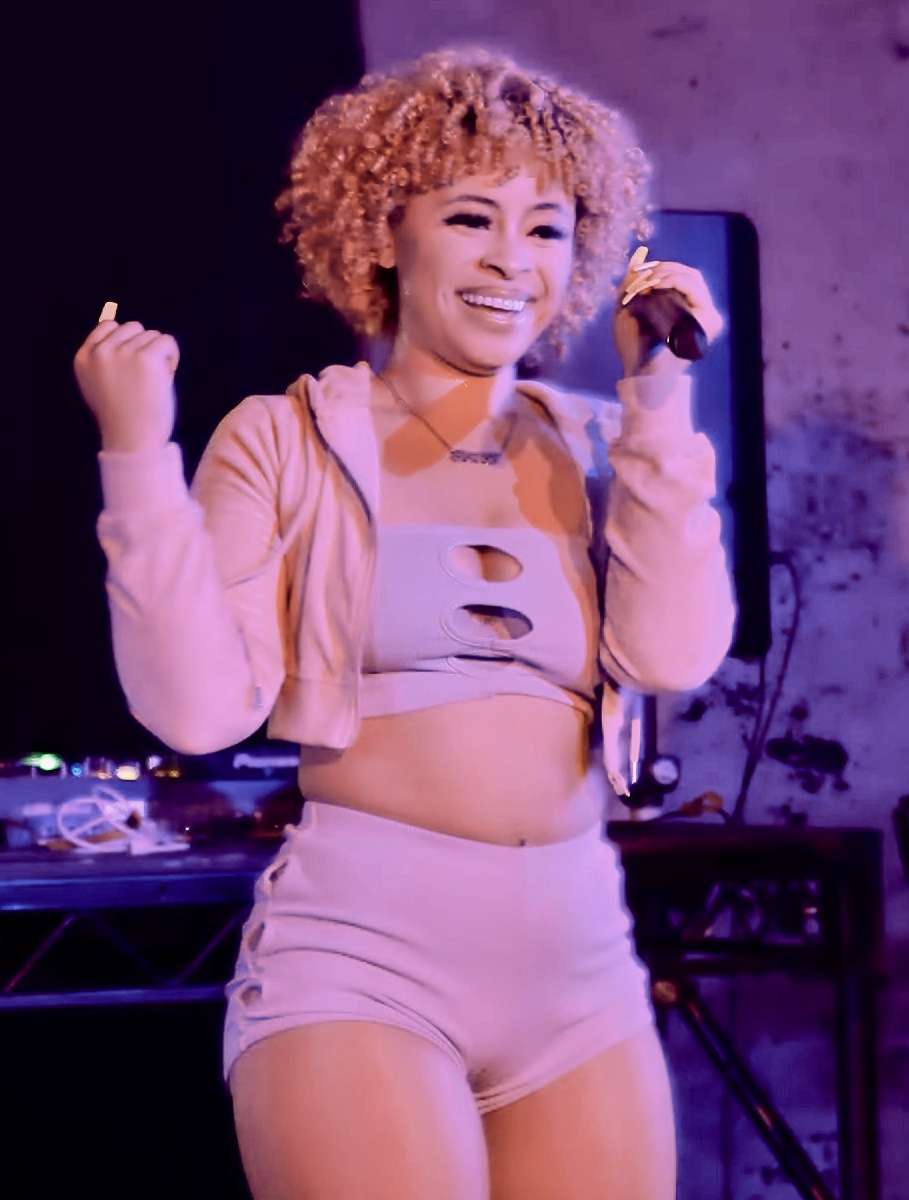
American rappers Doechii (left) and Ice Spice (right) joined Doja Cat on the opening leg of The Scarlet Tour.

On June 23, 2023, Doja Cat announced The Scarlet Tour, exactly 67 days before she officially revealed Scarlet as the title of the album. The first headlining arena tour of her career, it visited North America and Europe. Rappers Doechii and Ice Spice served as supporting acts on the North American leg while singer Hemlocke Springs opened for the Europe trek. This comes after the Hot Pink Tour in support of her second album was cancelled due to the COVID-19 pandemic. The Scarlet Tour commenced on October 31, 2023, in San Francisco, United States, and concluded on September 28, 2024, in New York City, United States, consisting of 25 dates across the US, 15 in Europe, and 1 date in Canada. Fan registration for the tour took place on June 25, followed by its presale three days later. Tickets went on sale on June 30 via Ticketmaster.

At the 2023 MTV Video Music Awards, Doja performed a medley of "Attention", "Paint the Town Red", and "Demons", dressed in a grey suit and glasses, and trailed by multiple dancers resembling the blood-soaked "Scarlet" alter ego. Justin Curto of Vulture highlighted the performance as one of the best moments of the night, describing the "preppy" outfit as "giving Joan Cusack in School of Rock", while Joey Nolfi of Entertainment Weekly compared it to Britney Spears in the "...Baby One More Time" music video. Pitchfork's Madison Bloom echoed Nolfi's sentiment while describing the dancers' choreography as "recall[ing] Luca Guadagnino's Suspiria remake" and praising the performance as one of the best of the night. In late September, Doja performed "Ouchies" and "Attention" at the 2023 Victoria's Secret Fashion Show, which was released as a Prime Video special titled The Tour '23. The following month, she performed "Paint the Town Red" and "Agora Hills" on the Live Lounge.

=== Scarlet 2 Claude ===
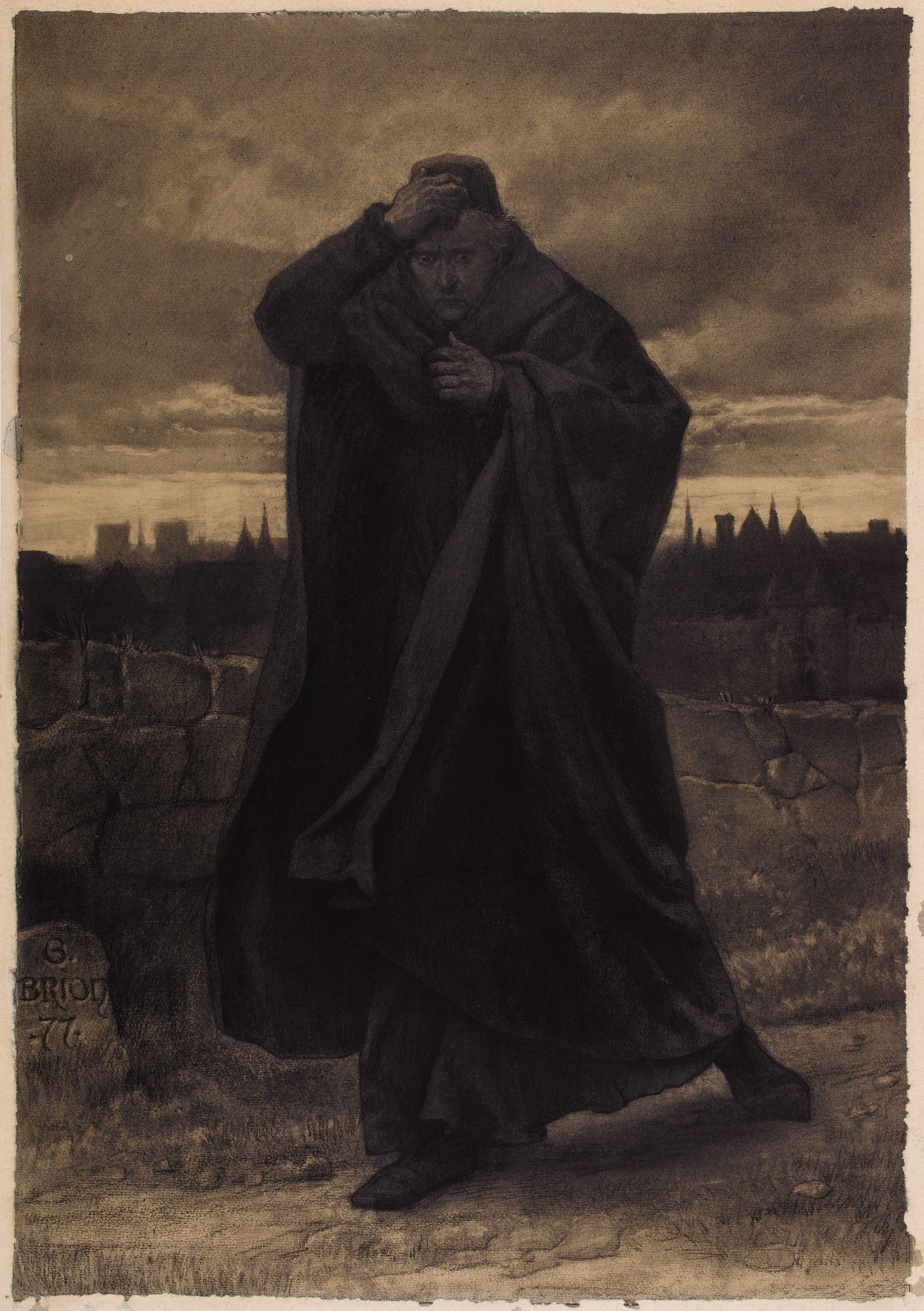
Scarlet 2 Claude was inspired by Claude Frollo, the antagonist of The Hunchback of Notre-Dame (1831).

During an interview on The Therapy Gecko Podcast in February 2024, Doja Cat confirmed that she was gearing to release the reissue of Scarlet, tentatively named Scarlet 2: Claude Frollo. On March 29, Doja Cat shared the reissue's cover art and release date. Some fans commented that the artwork resembled sheep's wool or pubic hair. In response, she criticized these comparisons and explained that "I had a photographer take a picture of the top of my head. And we blew it up and we made it so that my album cover is my hair. So my hair, to describe it, is 4C hair texture," referring to the classification according to the Andre Walker Hair Typing System.

Scarlet 2 Claude was released on April 5, 2024, containing seven new tracks. "Masc" featuring Teezo Touchdown was released simultaneously as a promotional single, accompanied by a music video directed by Doja Cat and Jamal Peters. "Okloser" was sent to US pop radio as a single on April 19, 2024, followed by a release to US rhythmic contemporary radio on April 23. On May 17, 2024, alternate versions of the reissue tracks "Disrespectful" and "Acknowledge Me" as well as the standard track "Shutcho" were added to Scarlet 2 Claude. All tracks feature South African a cappella group the Joy, with whom Doja Cat had performed during her Coachella 2024 set.

Scarlet 2 Claude is titled after Claude Frollo, the antagonist of Victor Hugo's 1831 novel The Hunchback of Notre-Dame. On The Therapy Gecko Podcast, Doja Cat revealed she chose to name the edition after Frollo because she felt that his tyrannical personality "connects to the story of Scarlet in some way," and serves as a "metaphor for the people that creatives endure on a daily basis in a bigger picture, a bigger scale."

== Commercial performance ==
Scarlet officially debuted at number four on the US Billboard 200 dated October 7, 2023. The album moved 72,000 album-equivalent units in its opening week, of which 6,000 were pure album sales. This marked Doja's third top ten album in the United States. Scarlet also opened at number two on both the Top R&B/Hip-Hop Albums and Top Rap Albums charts, making it her first entry on the latter.

Internationally, the album peaked within the top 30 in every territory it charted in with the exception of Nigeria, where it peaked at number 45. In the United Kingdom, Scarlet debuted at number five on the UK Albums Chart. The album also peaked within the top ten in New Zealand, Canada, Australia, Norway, Slovakia, Lithuania, the Netherlands and the Czech Republic, while reaching the top twenty in Poland, Switzerland, France, Ireland, Sweden, Denmark, Finland and Croatia.

== Critical reception ==
Professional ratings
Aggregate scores
Source	Rating
AnyDecentMusic?	6.6/10
Metacritic	70/100
Review scores
Source	Rating
AllMusic	3/5 stars
American Songwriter	4.5/5 stars
Clash	6/10
The Guardian	3/5 stars
HipHopDX	3.3/5
The Independent	4/5 stars
The Line of Best Fit	9/10
NME	3/5 stars
Pitchfork	5.9/10
RapReviews	7/10

According to the review aggregator Metacritic, Scarlet received "generally favorable reviews" based on a weighted average score of 70 out of 100 from 13 critic scores. Aggregating ten critic scores, AnyDecentMusic? rated Scarlet a 6.6 out of 10.

Variety's Jem Aswad dubbed Scarlet as Doja Cat's best album, giving heavy praise towards her songwriting and the album's production. He found some "sags in a couple of spots," but wrote that the album "sets a new bar on multiple levels, and not just for female rappers." PJ Somerville of The Line of Best Fit predicted that Scarlet would be a divisive listen, but lauded Doja Cat's ability to "paint a vivid picture" and "create a hit". The Independent's Roisin O'Connor complimented how Doja Cat incorporated the styles of her musical influences, highlighting Nicki Minaj's "wide-eyed insouciance" on "Gun", D'Angelo's "gorgeous" croons on "Often" and Kendrick Lamar's "silky, dangerous tones" on "Demons".

Nick Levine of NME found Scarlet to be an "overlong, slightly repetitive but ultimately compelling album of two halves." Alexis Petridis for The Guardian disliked the album's "weird" structure and distorted approach to its love songs. Rolling Stone's Larisha Paul deemed Scarlet to be "just another chapter" of Doja Cat "burning the pages of the rulebook on pop stardom." Concluding her review for Clash, Madeline Smith wrote, "At its core, Scarlet is an interesting exploration into the world of ego trips, the trappings of fame, escapism and novelty, a welcome deviation with a heightened sense of maturity and finesse."

Year-end lists
Publication	Accolade	Rank	Ref.
Billboard	The 50 Best Albums of 2023	7	
BrooklynVegan	25 Best Rap Albums of 2023	9	
Clash	Albums of the Year 2023	38	
Complex	The 50 Best Albums of 2023	4	
HuffPost	The Best Albums of 2023	—N/a	
Hypebeast	The Best Music Projects of 2023	—N/a	
NPR Music	Best Albums of 2023	—N/a	
Stereogum	The 10 Best Rap Albums of 2023	5	
Uproxx	The 2023 Uproxx Music Critics Poll	28	
Variety	The Best Albums of 2023	3	

== Track listing ==
All lyrics are written by Amala Zandile Dlamini

Standard edition
No.	Title	Writer(s)	Producer(s)	Length
1.	"Paint the Town Red"	Dlamini; Burt Bacharach; Hal David; Isaac Earl Bynum; Jean-Baptiste Kouame; Karl Rubin; Ryan Buendia	Earl on the Beat; Rubin; Jean-Baptiste; DJ Replay	3:50
2.	"Demons"	Dlamini; David Lewis Doman; Christina Doman	D.A. Got That Dope	3:15
3.	"Wet Vagina"	Dlamini; Kurtis McKenzie; Oliver Rodigan; Jiseok Lee; Sung Woo Lee	McKenzie; Cadenza; Flip_00	3:12
4.	"Fuck the Girls (FTG)"	Dlamini; McKenzie; Mike Riley; Elliot Dubock; Amil Raja	McKenzie; Scribz Riley; Beat Butcha	2:32
5.	"Ouchies"	Dlamini; London Holmes; Devon Rhys Roberts; Sean Momberger; Philip Cornish; Tommy Brown; Luther Campbell	London on da Track; Roberts; Momberger	2:02
6.	"97"	Dlamini; Sam Barsh; Jahlil Gunter	Barsh; Jay Versace	2:57
7.	"Gun"	Dlamini; McKenzie; Lee Stashenko; Aubrey Robinson	McKenzie; Fallen; Boobie	2:56
8.	"Go Off"	Dlamini; McKenzie; Stashenko	McKenzie; Fallen; Rian Lewis^{[a]}	3:17
9.	"Shutcho"	Dlamini; Bynum; Gentuar Memishi; Bennett Pepple; Eric Stewart; Graham Gouldman	Earl on the Beat; Gent!; Bangs	3:07
10.	"Agora Hills"	Dlamini; Bynum; Memishi; Pepple; Kouame; Brian Holland; Michael Smith	Earl on the Beat; Gent!; Jean-Baptiste; Bangs	4:25
11.	"Can't Wait"	Dlamini; Bynum; Kouame; Jasper Harris; Presley Regier; Aaron Shadrow; Roy C. Hammond	Earl on the Beat; Jean-Baptiste; Harris; Regier; Shadrow	3:55
12.	"Often"	Dlamini; Gunter; Ben Nartey; Derex Williams	Jay Versace; Nartey	3:18
13.	"Love Life"	Dlamini; Gunter; Nartey	Jay Versace; Nartey^{[a]}	3:56
14.	"Skull and Bones"	Dlamini; Austin Owens; Adrian Sealy; Derek Kastal; Justin Robbins; Leonard LaTouche; Marcus Rucker	Ayo the Producer; Kaeyos	4:08
15.	"Attention"	Dlamini; Ari David Starace; Rogét Chahayed	Y2K; Chahayed; Mayer Hawthorne^{[a]}	4:35
16.	"Balut"	Dlamini; David Sprecher; Chahayed; McKenzie	Yeti Beats; Chahayed; McKenzie	3:27
17.	"WYM Freestyle"	Dlamini; McKenzie; Bradley Powell; Sergio Romero	McKenzie; Brad!; Serg Dior	2:04
Total length:				56:56

2 Claude edition
No.	Title	Writer(s)	Producer(s)	Length
1.	"Acknowledge Me"	Dlamini; Darhyl Camper	Camper	3:10
2.	"Disrespectful"	Dlamini; James Austin Cyr; PJ Escobar; Timon Behar; Yann Cortequisse	London Cyr; yeeshy; Kali Kali	2:36
3.	"Urrrge!!!!!!!!!!" (featuring ASAP Rocky)	Dlamini; Derrick Hill; Kelvin Magnusen; Kory Fernie; Michael Holmes; Rakim Mayers; Tyler Jones	DZL	2:32
4.	"Okloser"	Dlamini; Harris; Carter Lang; David Sprecher; Jared Solomon; Kevin Yancey	Yeti Beats; Lang; Harris; Solomonophonic; Kevo	2:49
5.	"Masc" (featuring Teezo Touchdown)	Dlamini; Aaron Thomas; Brensean Winston; Darryl Clemons; Kevin Andre Price; Mathias Liyew; Thomas Lumpkins	Pooh Beatz; Go Grizzly; Tommy Parker; Ambezza	3:25
6.	"Piss"	Dlamini; Alex Petit; Henri Velasco	CashMoneyAP; Hoops	2:35
7.	"Headhigh"	Dlamini; Emil Larbi; Kurtis McKenzie	McKenzie; Emil	3:19
Total length:				20:26

=== Notes ===
- ^{^[a]} signifies an additional producer
- On the standard edition "Shutcho" and "WYM Freestyle" are only available on digital editions.
- Standard edition is listed under a second disc in the 2 Claude edition.
- A digital bonus edition of Scarlet 2 Claude on May 16, 2024 includes The Joy as features on new versions of "Disrespectful", "Acknowledge Me", and "Shutcho". The durations for these versions are 3:24, 3:42, and 4:30 respectively, the tracks are listed as being under a third disc on the release.
- The additional tracks on the 2 Claude edition, excluding the new version of "Shutcho", are stylized in all caps.

=== Sample credits ===
- "Paint the Town Red" contains a sample from "Walk On By", written by Burt Bacharach and Hal David, as performed by Dionne Warwick.
- "Ouchies" contains a sample from "Come On", written by Luther Campbell, as performed by Luke.
- "Agora Hills" contains a sample from "All I Do Is Think of You", written by Brian Holland and Michael Lovesmith, as performed by Troop which originally performed by The Jackson 5.
- "Shutcho" contains a sample from "I'm Not in Love", written by Eric Stewart and Graham Gouldman, as performed by 10cc.
- "Can't Wait" contains a sample from "Impeach the President", written by Roy C. Hammond, as performed by the Honey Drippers.
- "Balut" contains a sample of Ric Flair.

== Personnel ==
- Doja Cat – vocals, executive production
- Dale Becker – mastering (tracks 1, 5, 15)
- Mike Bozzi – mastering (2–4, 6–14, 16, 17)
- Serban Ghenea – mixing (1)
- Neal Pogue – mixing (2–4, 6–8, 10–14, 16, 17)
- Jesse Ray Ernster – mixing (5)
- Rian Lewis – mixing (9), recording (all tracks)
- Jeff Ellis – mixing (15)
- Bryce Bordone – engineering (1)
- Sam Barsh – engineering, keyboards (6)
- Joe Harrison – engineering, guitar (4)
- Julian Vasquez – engineering (16), recording (15, 16)
- Katie Harvey – engineering assistance (1, 5)

== Charts ==
=== Weekly charts ===
Weekly chart performance for Scarlet
Chart (2023)	Peak position
Australian Albums (ARIA)	5
Austrian Albums (Ö3 Austria)	22
Belgian Albums (Ultratop Flanders)	30
Belgian Albums (Ultratop Wallonia)	23
Canadian Albums (Billboard)	4
Croatian International Albums (HDU)	18
Czech Albums (ČNS IFPI)	6
Danish Albums (Hitlisten)	15
Dutch Albums (Album Top 100)	6
Finnish Albums (Suomen virallinen lista)	16
French Albums (SNEP)	12
German Albums (Offizielle Top 100)	29
Hungarian Albums (MAHASZ)	21
Icelandic Albums (Tónlistinn)	21
Irish Albums (Official Charts)	13
Italian Albums (FIMI)	22
Lithuanian Albums (AGATA)	5
New Zealand Albums (RMNZ)	2
Nigerian Albums (TurnTable Top 50)	45
Norwegian Albums (VG-lista)	4
Polish Albums (ZPAV)	11
Scottish Albums (Official Charts)	30
Slovak Albums (ČNS IFPI)	4
Spanish Albums (Promusicae)	28
Swedish Albums (Sverigetopplistan)	14
Swiss Albums (Schweizer Hitparade)	11
UK Albums (Official Charts)	5
UK R&B Albums (Official Charts)	2
US Billboard 200	4
US Top R&B/Hip-Hop Albums (Billboard)	2

Chart performance for Scarlet 2 Claude
Chart (2024)	Peak position
New Zealand Albums (RMNZ)	21

=== Year-end charts ===
Year-end chart performance for Scarlet
Chart (2024)	Position
French Albums (SNEP)	175
US Billboard 200	55
US Top R&B/Hip-Hop Albums (Billboard)	21

== Certifications ==
Certifications and sales for Scarlet
Region	Certification	Certified units/sales
Belgium (BRMA)	Gold	10,000^{‡}
Brazil (Pro-Música Brasil)	Platinum	40,000^{‡}
Canada (Music Canada)	Platinum	80,000^{‡}
France (SNEP)	Gold	50,000^{‡}
New Zealand (RMNZ)	Gold	7,500^{‡}
New Zealand (RMNZ) Scarlet 2 Claude	Platinum	15,000^{‡}
Poland (ZPAV)	Platinum	20,000^{‡}
United Kingdom (BPI)	Silver	60,000^{‡}
United States (RIAA)	Platinum	1,000,000^{‡}
^{‡} Sales+streaming figures based on certification alone.

== Release history ==
Release dates and formats for Scarlet
Region	Date	Format(s)	Edition	Label	Ref.
Various	September 22, 2023	Box set; CD; digital download; streaming	Standard	Kemosabe; RCA	
Various	April 5, 2024	Digital download; streaming	2 Claude	Kemosabe; RCA	
Various	May 16, 2024	Digital download; streaming	2 Claude (bonus edition)	Kemosabe; RCA	
Various	October 18, 2024	LP	2 Claude	Kemosabe; RCA	
