= Ozone (American band) =

70s funk band

- Ozone during their tenure at Motown

Background information
- Origin: Nashville, Tennessee
- Genres: Funk, R&B, disco, soul
- Years active: 1977–
- Label: Motown
- Spinoff of: The Endeavors
- Past members: Charles A. Glenn Jr. James S. Stewart Jr. Paul Hines; Benny Wallace; Thomas Bumpass; William White; Ray Woodward; Greg Hargrove; Herman Brown; Joe Foxxworth

Ozone was a funk and R&B group during the late 1970s and early 1980s, signed to Motown Records.

== History ==
When the Nashville funk band The Endeavors broke up in 1977, three of its members, Benny Wallace, Jimmy Stewart and Charles Glenn, formed a new group of their own. They called it ‘Ozone’. The trio later recruited trumpeter Thomas Bumpass, saxophonist and vocalist William "Billy" White, saxophonist and vocalist Ray Woodward, guitarist Greg Hargrove and drummer Paul Hines. In 1981 guitarist Herman Brown replaced Greg Hargrove.

During their first two years, Ozone performed as backup singers for Billy Preston and Syreeta, who were with Motown Records at the time. This relationship led to them receiving a deal of their own in 1979. They released their debut LP, Walk On, in 1980. It was mostly instrumental funk and jazz-funk. For the group's next album, Motown appointed Michael Lovesmith on vocals.

Over the next two years, they released 3 full-length albums on Motown: Jump On It (which failed to chart), Lil' Suzy (#45 R&B, #152 Hot 200), and Send It (#61 R&B). Their final album to be released, the LP Glasses, also came out on Motown in 1983, and was reissued around 2008 on CD by PTG Records in the Netherlands. The song "(Our Hearts) Will Always Shine" from that album had minor success in the UK.

Although Ozone served as backup to Billy Preston and Syreeta, they are best remembered for their work with Teena Marie. They appeared on several tracks on Lady T in 1980. They were also featured on the song "Chains" from her album Irons in the Fire that same year. The majority of her songs’ horn arrangements were handled by Ozone.

Marie returned the favor by composing for and performing with Ozone on several of their albums. She appeared on half of the tracks on Send It in 1981. Marie also wrote and can be heard on their minor hit "Gigolette".

Ozone also aided Bobby Nunn on his 1982 single “She's Just A Groupie” and his 1983 album Private Party. Motown's Bobby Nunn is not to be confused with doo-wop singer Bobby Nunn.

Even though their biggest hits "Strutt My Thang" and "Gigolette" only peaked at #73 and 55 on the R&B charts respectively, and no other singles charted, Ozone have made their way onto several funk compilation albums.

In 2018 Ozone reunited with Charles Glenn, Rodney Trotter, Derek Organ, Ewen Williams, Rodney Thomas, Patricia Thomas and D'LaVance.

== Discography ==
- Walk On (Motown, 1980)
- Jump On It (Motown, 1981)
- Send It (Motown, 1981)
- Lil' Suzy (Motown, 1982)
- Glasses (Motown, 1983)

=== Featured on ===
Teena Marie

- Lady T (1980) 1 track
- Irons in the Fire (1980) 3 tracks

Bobby Nunn

- She's Just a Groupie (1982)
- Private Party (1983)
