= Demons (Doja Cat song) =

Promotional single by Doja Cat

from the album Scarlet
- Released: September 1, 2023
- Recorded: 2023
- Genre: Hardcore rap; horrorcore; punk rap
- Length: 3:15
- Label: Kemosabe; RCA
- Songwriters: Amala Zandile Dlamini; Christina Doman; Danny Levin; David "D.A." Doman
- Producer: D.A. Got That Dope

Music video
- "Demons" on YouTube

"Demons" is a song by American rapper and singer Doja Cat from her fourth studio album, Scarlet (2023). It was released on September 1, 2023, through Kemosabe and RCA Records as the second promotional single from the album. The song is produced by American record producer D.A. Got That Dope.

== Background and promotion ==
Doja Cat first alluded to a demon-inspired theme in early March 2023, when she changed her profile picture on TikTok to that of a demon and posted outtakes of a photoshoot that show her dressed as a demon. A set of blood-stained photos she shared on Instagram on July 12 was further described as "demonic" and "creepy". "Demons" as a title was first revealed as part of the tracklist along with a short snippet in April 2023.

On August 27, 2023, Doja shared a still of the upcoming music video that shows her sitting in a bathtub filled with a thick black liquid and a sharp-nailed demon holding her head while possessing her. She announced the single on her social media on August 28, 2023. In the cover art for the song, the rapper is seen standing upside down from a living room ceiling with the words "Demons" written on the carpet while being covered in black body paint, widely referred to as the "backroom" aesthetic. Creative director Gavin Taylor incorporated real imagery by vacuuming the title on purchased rugs and editing it with Photoshop. After the release of her previous single "Paint the Town Red" and its associated "death-related" imagery, "Demons" is seen as a continuation of said visual theme.

== Critical reception ==
"Demons" was well received by critics. On "Demons", Robin Murray of Clash described Doja Cat as an "American cross-genre inferno" with the track being "instantly infectious, with her biting rhymes cutting deeper than most". RGM praised the track, sharing that Doja Cat "spits bars like she's on the TDE roster".

"Demons" was noted by critics as being a change in sound for Doja Cat. Thania Garcia and McKinley Franklin of Variety commented that on "Demons", "the track sees Doja trade in her pop sound that fans fell in love with on "Say So" for a more rap-centric aura". Jon Stickler of Stereoboard commented that "the trap-inspired tune deals in punchy beats and layered synths that provide a foundation to lyrics addressing the recent criticism about her personal life". Sal Cinquemani of Slant Magazine stated that "the three-minute 'Demons' kicks off with a heavy, distorted beat and menacingly looped string sample, further fulfilling Doja Cat's promise that her latest album will eschew pop for a harder-edged hip-hop sound".

"Demons" additionally drew comparisons to the work of many other artists. Pitchfork's Shaad D'Souza compared the beat to a "pop-ified" version of Tyler, the Creator's work circa Goblin, while comparing Doja's "clipped" flow to a text-to-speech app, characterizing the song as "smart, sinister, and knowingly dumb, all at the same time." Tom Breihan of Stereogum compared the song to the works of Baby Keem, stating that the song's production "samples a shrill shriek of strings, transforming it into something choppy and brittle, while Doja Cat raps in a squeaky, affected toddler voice". RGM additionally compared Doja Cat on "Demons", stating "at times, she sounds like Nicki Minaj, then channels Kendrick Lamar, and even takes on the persona of an irate teacher".

== Music video ==
After premiering at Cinespia in Los Angeles on August 27, 2023, the trailer for the music video was later uploaded onto Doja Cat's official website, revealing it to be directed by Christian Breslauer and co-starring actress Christina Ricci.

The video features Doja in a demonic form, haunting a house and terrifying the people who live inside before driving them away; her supposedly demonic form was created with full-body makeup. D'Souza dubbed the video a "miniature horror film that's creepier and more fun than pretty much anything Blumhouse put out last year." He further praised Doja for keeping the "art of the iconic music video" alive, calling her "one of the form's few remaining practitioners". Charisma Madarang of Rolling Stone described the music video as "a stunning flex of macabre", noting its homages to the films, Poltergeist (1982) and The Shining (1980).

== Track listings ==
- Streaming/digital download
1. "Demons" – 3:15
- Streaming/digital download – Demons + Paint The Town Red
1. "Demons" – 3:15
2. "Paint the Town Red" (explicit) – 3:51
3. "Paint the Town Red" (sped up) – 3:30
4. "Paint the Town Red" (slowed down) – 5:31
5. "Paint the Town Red" (clean) – 3:51
6. "Paint the Town Red" (instrumental) – 3:51

== Charts ==
Chart performance for "Demons"
Chart (2023)	Peak position
Australia (ARIA)	77
Australia Hip Hop/R&B (ARIA)	20
Canada Hot 100 (Billboard)	53
Global 200 (Billboard)	65
Greece International (IFPI)	45
Ireland (IRMA)	70
New Zealand Hot Singles (RMNZ)	4
UK Singles (Official Charts)	53
UK Hip Hop/R&B (Official Charts)	24
US Billboard Hot 100	46
US Hot R&B/Hip-Hop Songs (Billboard)	12

== Certifications ==
Certifications for "Demons"
Region	Certification	Certified units/sales
Brazil (Pro-Música Brasil)	Gold	20,000^{‡}
Canada (Music Canada)	Gold	40,000^{‡}
^{‡} Sales+streaming figures based on certification alone.
