= Paint the Town Red (Doja Cat song) =

Single by Doja Cat

from the album Scarlet
- Released: August 4, 2023
- Genre: Hip-hop
- Length: 3:51 (album version); 3:27 (radio edit)
- Label: Kemosabe; RCA
- Composers: Burt Bacharach; Hal David; Isaac Earl Bynum; Jean-Baptiste Kouame; Karl Rubin; Ryan Buendia
- Lyricist: Amala Zandile Dlamini
- Producers: Earl on the Beat; Rubin; Jean-Baptiste; DJ Replay

Doja Cat singles chronology
"Kill Bill" (remix) (2023)	"Paint the Town Red" (2023)	"Agora Hills" (2023)

Music video
- "Paint the Town Red" on YouTube

"Paint the Town Red" is a song by American rapper and singer Doja Cat from her fourth studio album, Scarlet (2023). It was released on August 4, 2023, through Kemosabe and RCA Records as the lead single from the album. The song was written by Doja Cat and produced by Earl on the Beat, Rubin, Jean-Baptiste, and DJ Replay. The track samples Dionne Warwick's 1964 song "Walk on By". In the lyrics, the rapper dismisses her critics and asserts her own identity following arguments with fans on social media.

"Paint the Town Red" was a massive commercial success, topping the charts in 19 countries, including Australia, Canada, Ireland, New Zealand, Switzerland, the United Kingdom, and the United States. In the United Kingdom, it became the first solo song by a female rapper to top the UK Singles Chart, and in the United States, it became Doja Cat's second single, and first as a solo artist, to top the Billboard Hot 100. It reached the top ten as well in over 15 countries, including France, Belgium (Flandres), Finland, Germany, Sweden and Denmark. "Paint the Town Red" made history by becoming the first solo female rap song in Spotify history to top the platform's Global and US Top 50 chart and the fastest solo female rap song to amass 100 million streams.

The song received a nomination at the 66th Annual Grammy Awards for Best Pop Solo Performance. It was voted in at number one on the Triple J Hottest 100, 2023.

== Background and composition ==
"Paint The Town Red"
A short 21-second sample of "Paint the Town Red" by Doja Cat.

A two-second preview of the song was shared by Doja Cat on April 17, 2023, along with other tracks from her upcoming album. Doja would tease the song by continuously using the blood drop emoji, as well as putting a red filter over thumbnails of her previous music videos and album covers. She played the song in full length on July 18, while painting a white canvas in red. The painting would later turn out to be the single cover.

"Paint the Town Red" is a rap song. Upon release, the lyrics were interpreted by some as a reference to her previous behavior on social media, including the disapproval of a name used by a significant amount of her fanbase, and the subsequent arguments she had with some of them, in the weeks leading up to the release. Sampling Dionne Warwick's 1964 track "Walk On By", the song is backed by a "bouncy production" that sees Doja Cat rapping over a "subtly brassy, finger snap-laden beat", constituting an "contrast to the comparatively laid-back "Attention". The song is composed in G minor with the BPM being 100 beats per minute.

== Commercial performance ==
"Paint the Town Red" broke a number of streaming records on Spotify, making history as the first solo female rap song to top the platform's US Top 50 daily chart, and the Global Spotify 200 daily chart, and the fastest solo female rap song to amass 100 million streams.

The song peaked atop the Billboard Global 200 chart. It also became the first ever rap song to top Billboard Global Excl. U.S. chart.

=== North America ===
In the United States, "Paint the Town Red" debuted at number 15 on the Billboard Hot 100 on the chart issue dated August 19, 2023. Two weeks later it reached number five, after moving 21.1 million streams, 5,000 digital downloads sold, and 22.6 million airplay audience that week, a 49, 81, and 37 percent increase from the previous week. The song gained traction on the video-sharing app TikTok, with its audio soundtracking over 618,000 videos on the platform. The surge in popularity online fueled the song's performance; after moving to number three, it reached number one on the Hot 100 on the issue dated September 16, 2023. It became Doja Cat's second leader, her first solo US number-one, and the first rap song to top the Hot 100 in over a year since Nicki Minaj's "Super Freaky Girl" (2022). The song also topped the Billboard Hot R&B/Hip-Hop Songs and Hot Rap Songs charts for three weeks as well as their streaming and digital sales component charts. The song is also her 7th number one single on the Pop Airplay chart, the most among all artist this decade. The song is also her first to peak atop the Radio Songs chart.

=== Europe ===
"Paint the Town Red" debuted at number 20 on the UK Singles Chart on August 17, 2023. It rose to number 15 the following week before entering the top ten on August 31, 2023. It reached number four, becoming Doja Cat's fourth top ten hit in the UK and outpeaking its sample "Walk On By", which hit number nine. On August 27, 2023, the Official Charts Company announced that the song was leading the race to hit number one that week, with only 1,000 units separating "Paint the Town Red" from its competitors. The song then reached number two, blocked by Olivia Rodrigo's "Vampire" from the top spot. The following week, "Paint the Town Red" rose to number one, becoming Doja Cat's first chart-topper in the United Kingdom. In France, the song debuted at number 132 and reached the top five four weeks later, at number 5, becoming Doja Cat's first top five, tying with Nicki Minaj to be the only female rapper to reaching the top five in solo and in featuring. The song stayed 45 weeks, becoming her fourth longest running song after "Say So", "Del Mar" and "Woman", and was certified Diamond, her fifth at this time, tying again with Minaj. In Germany, the song debuted at number 71 and reached the second position, becoming Doja Cat's first top two in the country and the highest-charting song since Woman, which peaked at number 18.

== Music video ==
An accompanying music video was released on August 4, 2023, and was directed by Nina McNeely. It features Doja Cat peeling out her eyeball which then falls into hell. Doja is later seen keeping company with death and Satan. Other scenes show her throwing bloody chunks of meat and riding on a green creature through the sky. In France, the music video was broadcast with blurring and with a warning "-10" in some channels due to death references, disturbing images and nudity.

== Live performances ==
Doja Cat performed "Paint the Town Red" for the first time at the 2023 MTV Video Music Awards as part of a medley with the tracks "Attention" and "Demons". The performance featured the singer dressed in a grey suit and glasses, and "trailed by blood-soaked dancers". Writers praised the performance as one of the best moments of the night and compared Doja's "preppy" outfit to those worn by Joan Cusack in School of Rock and Britney Spears in the "...Baby One More Time" music video.

== In popular media ==
On November 1, 2023, "Paint the Town Red" would be used in a video on social media by All Elite Wrestling to promote their women's division, with wrestlers including Toni Storm, Hikaru Shida, Saraya, and Kris Statlander appearing.

== Accolades ==
Paint the Town Red awards and nominations
Awards and nominations
Award	Wins	Nominations
Grammy Awards	0	1
Brit Awards	0	1
MTV Video Music Awards	0	2
Billboard Music Awards	0	1
iHeartRadio Music Awards (Note: Including iHeartRadio Titanium Awards.)	1	5
Triple J Hottest 100	1	1
NRJ Music Awards	0	1
Hito Music Awards	1	1
BMI Pop Music Awards	1	1
BMI R&B/Hip-Hop Music Awards	1	1
Spotify Billions Club Plaques	1	1
ASCAP Rhythm & Soul Music Awards	1	1
ASCAP Pop Music Awards	1	1

Totals (Note: Certain award groups do not simply award one winner. They acknowledge several different recipients, have runners-up, and have third place. Since this is a specific recognition and is different from losing an award, runner-up mentions are considered wins in this award tally. For simplification and to avoid errors, each award in this list has been presumed to have had a prior nomination.)
- Wins: 31
- Nominations: 55

Awards and nominations for "Paint the Town Red"
Organization	Year	Category	Result	Ref.
ARIA Charts Awards	2023	#1 Chart Award (Singles)	Won	
Ciclope Festival Awards	2023	Music Video - Color Grading	Nominated	
IRMA Awards	2023	IRMA Number 1 Award (Singles)	Won	
IW Music Awards (Note: The IW Music Awards are awards created by the Intensive Watch Company (IW) in Thailand. Each month, one international song is awarded for being the most popular on TV & Radio in Thailand. The annual awards are based on the chart performance of the songs on Radio & TV.)	2023	International Song of the Month (October)	Won	
IW Music Awards	2023	International Song of the Month (November)	Won	
IW Music Awards	2023	International Song of the Year	Runner-up	
MTV Europe Music Awards	2023	Best Video	Nominated	
MTV Europe Music Awards	2023	Best Song	Nominated	
MTV Video Music Awards	2023	Song of Summer	Nominated	
The Daily Californian's Arts Awards	2023	Best Billboard Hot 100 Single	Won	
Triple J Hottest 100	2023	Song of the Year	Won	
Official Charts Company	2023	Number Single 1 Award	Won	
Official Charts Company	2023	Specialist Number 1 Award - Hip Hop and R&B Singles	Won	
Official Charts Company	2023	Specialist Number 1 Award - Streaming Singles	Won	
Official Charts Company	2023	Specialist Number 1 Award - Singles Sales	Won	
Official Charts Company	2023	Specialist Number 1 Award - Video Streaming	Won	
Vimeo Staff Picks Awards	2023	Staff Picked Video	Won	
AICP Show Awards	2024	Licensed Soundtrack or Arrangement (Note: As SiriusXM's commercial "A Life in Sound", Doja Cat for Paint the Town Red is credited as composer and performer)	Won	
ASCAP Pop Music Awards	2024	Winning Songs of the Year	Won	
ASCAP Rhythm & Soul Music Awards	2024	Winning Songs of the Year	Won	
Billboard Music Awards	2024	Top Rap Song	Nominated	
BMI Pop Awards	2024	Most Performed Songs of the Year	Won	
BMI R&B/Hip-Hop Awards	2024	Most Performed Songs of the Year	Won	
Brit Awards	2024	International Song of the Year	Nominated	
Cannes Lions International Festival of Creativity	2024	Silver Award — Use of Licensed/Adapted Music	Won	
Cannes Lions International Festival of Creativity	2024	Bronze Award - Music, Direction	Won	
Ciclope Festival Awards	2024	Silver Award — Sound & Music - Licensed Music	Won	
Creative Circle Awards	2024	Silver Award — Best Use of Existing Music	Won	
GAFFA Awards (Denmark)	2024	International Song of the Year	Nominated	
GAFFA Awards (Sweden)	2024	International Hit of the Year	Nominated	
Gerety Awards	2024	Bronze Award — Music	Won	
Global Awards	2024	Best Song	Nominated	
Grammy Awards	2024	Best Pop Solo Performance	Nominated	
MTV Video Music Awards	2024	Video of the Year	Nominated	
Hit FM Music Awards	2024	Top 10 Singles	Won	
Hito Music Awards	2024	Western Song of the Year	Won	
IHeartRadio Music Awards	2024	Song of the Year	Nominated	
IHeartRadio Music Awards	2024	Best Music Video	Nominated	
IHeartRadio Music Awards	2024	Best Lyrics	Nominated	
IHeartRadio Music Awards	2024	TikTok Bop of the Year	Nominated	
Nickelodeon Kids' Choice Awards	2024	Favorite Song	Nominated	
Music+Sound Awards	2024	Best Sync In Online, Social + Digital Advertising	Won	
New Music Awards	2024	Country Song of the Year	Nominated	
NRJ Music Awards	2024	Social Hit	Nominated	
People's Choice Awards	2024	Song of the Year	Nominated	
SEC Awards (Note: The SEC Awards (formerly known as Séries em Cena Awards) is a Brazilian Award Show. It awards movies, tv series, music and internet influencers. It was created in 2019.)	2024	International Hit	Nominated	
Shark Awards	2024	Silver Award — Best Use of Licensed Music	Won	
Shark Awards	2024	Best Colour Grading	Nominated	
Spotify Billions Club Plaques	2024	One Billion Total Streams on Spotify	Won	
Webby Awards	2024	Video & Film Music Video	Nominated	
Clio Awards	2025	Silver Award — Music - Licensed (Professional)	Won	
Clio Awards	2025	Bronze Award — Direction (Professional)	Won	
iHeartRadio Titanium Music Awards	2025	One Billion Total Spins on iHeartRadio Stations	Won	

== Charts ==
=== Weekly charts ===
Weekly chart performance
Chart (2023–2024)	Peak position
Australia (ARIA)	1
Australia Hip Hop/R&B (ARIA)	1
Austria (Ö3 Austria Top 40)	2
Belarus Airplay (TopHit)	33
Belgium (Ultratop 50 Flanders)	17
Belgium (Ultratop 50 Wallonia)	4
Bolivia Airplay (Monitor Latino)	14
Brazil Hot 100 (Billboard)	72
Bulgaria Airplay (PROPHON)	1
Canada Hot 100 (Billboard)	1
Canada CHR/Top 40 (Billboard)	2
Canada Hot AC (Billboard)	27
CIS Airplay (TopHit)	11
Croatia (Billboard)	15
Czech Republic Singles Digital (ČNS IFPI)	1
Denmark (Tracklisten)	5
El Salvador (Monitor Latino)	16
Estonia Airplay (TopHit)	2
Finland (Suomen virallinen lista)	7
France (SNEP)	5
Germany (GfK)	2
Global 200 (Billboard)	1
Greece International (IFPI)	1
Hong Kong (Billboard)	16
Hungary (Single Top 40)	4
Iceland (Tónlistinn)	2
India International (IMI)	3
Indonesia (Billboard)	23
Ireland (IRMA)	1
Israel (Mako Hitlist)	77
Italy (FIMI)	17
Japan Hot Overseas (Billboard Japan)	1
Kazakhstan Airplay (TopHit)	5
Latvia Airplay (LaIPA)	16
Latvia Streaming (LaIPA)	1
Lebanon (Lebanese Top 20)	2
Lithuania (AGATA)	1
Lithuania Airplay (TopHit)	7
Luxembourg (Billboard)	1
Malaysia (Billboard)	3
Malaysia International (RIM)	2
MENA (IFPI)	4
Moldova Airplay (TopHit)	127
Netherlands (Dutch Top 40)	9
Netherlands (Single Top 100)	2
New Zealand (Recorded Music NZ)	1
Nigeria (TurnTable Top 100)	36
North Africa (IFPI)	7
Norway (VG-lista)	2
Panama (Monitor Latino)	11
Panama (PRODUCE)	13
Paraguay (Monitor Latino)	8
Philippines (Billboard)	6
Poland (Polish Streaming Top 100)	7
Portugal (AFP)	11
Romania (Billboard)	7
Romania Airplay (TopHit)	129
Russia Airplay (TopHit)	19
San Marino Airplay (SMRTV Top 50)	37
Saudi Arabia (IFPI)	8
Serbia Airplay (Radiomonitor)	12
Singapore (RIAS)	2
Slovakia Airplay (ČNS IFPI)	25
Slovakia Singles Digital (ČNS IFPI)	1
South Africa Streaming (TOSAC)	7
South Korea (Circle)	86
Spain (PROMUSICAE)	69
Suriname (Nationale Top 40)	6
Sweden (Sverigetopplistan)	4
Switzerland (Schweizer Hitparade)	1
Taiwan (Billboard)	10
Turkey (Billboard)	23
Turkey International Airplay (Radiomonitor Türkiye)	1
UAE (IFPI)	2
UK Singles (Official Charts)	1
UK Hip Hop/R&B (Official Charts)	1
US Billboard Hot 100	1
US Adult Contemporary (Billboard)	27
US Adult Pop Airplay (Billboard)	13
US Dance Airplay (Billboard)	16
US Hot R&B/Hip-Hop Songs (Billboard)	1
US Pop Airplay (Billboard)	1
US R&B/Hip-Hop Airplay (Billboard)	15
US Rhythmic Airplay (Billboard)	1
Vietnam (Vietnam Hot 100)	4

=== Monthly charts ===
Monthly chart performance
Chart (2023)	Peak position
Belarus Airplay (TopHit)	35
CIS Airplay (TopHit)	14
Czech Republic (Singles Digitál Top 100)	1
Estonia Airplay (TopHit)	2
Kazakhstan Airplay (TopHit)	7
Latvia Airplay (TopHit)	21
Lithuania Airplay (TopHit)	5
Paraguay (SGP)	19
Russia Airplay (TopHit)	25
Slovakia (Rádio Top 100)	30
Slovakia (Singles Digitál Top 100)	1
South Korea (Circle)	91

=== Year-end charts ===
Year-end chart performance
Chart (2023)	Position
Australia (ARIA)	14
Austria (Ö3 Austria Top 40)	30
Belgium (Ultratop Wallonia)	64
Canada (Canadian Hot 100)	40
CIS Airplay (TopHit)	113
Denmark (Tracklisten)	92
Estonia Airplay (TopHit)	44
France (SNEP)	60
Germany (Official German Charts)	37
Global 200 (Billboard)	82
Hungary (Single Top 40)	20
Iceland (Tónlistinn)	37
Lithuania Airplay (TopHit)	18
Netherlands (Dutch Top 40)	68
Netherlands (Single Top 100)	42
New Zealand (Recorded Music NZ)	16
Poland (Polish Streaming Top 100)	60
Russia Airplay (TopHit)	182
Switzerland (Schweizer Hitparade)	23
UK Singles (OCC)	26
US Billboard Hot 100	52
US Hot R&B/Hip-Hop Songs (Billboard)	20
US Mainstream Top 40 (Billboard)	44
US Rhythmic (Billboard)	32

Year-end chart performance
Chart (2024)	Position
Australia (ARIA)	41
Australia Hip Hop/R&B (ARIA)	5
Canada (Canadian Hot 100)	28
CIS Airplay (TopHit)	94
Estonia Airplay (TopHit)	107
France (SNEP)	115
Global 200 (Billboard)	27
New Zealand (Recorded Music NZ)	43
US Billboard Hot 100	21
US Adult Top 40 (Billboard)	43
US Hot R&B/Hip-Hop Songs (Billboard)	8
US Mainstream Top 40 (Billboard)	5
US Rhythmic (Billboard)	9

== Certifications ==
Certifications
Region	Certification	Certified units/sales
Australia (ARIA)	5× Platinum	350,000^{‡}
Austria (IFPI Austria)	Platinum	30,000^{‡}
Belgium (BRMA)	Platinum	40,000^{‡}
Brazil (Pro-Música Brasil)	Diamond	160,000^{‡}
Canada (Music Canada)	7× Platinum	560,000^{‡}
Denmark (IFPI Danmark)	Platinum	90,000^{‡}
France (SNEP)	Diamond	333,333^{‡}
Germany (BVMI)	Gold	300,000^{‡}
Hungary (MAHASZ)	3× Platinum	12,000^{‡}
Italy (FIMI)	Platinum	100,000^{‡}
Mexico (AMPROFON)	Platinum+Gold	210,000^{‡}
New Zealand (RMNZ)	4× Platinum	120,000^{‡}
Poland (ZPAV)	2× Platinum	100,000^{‡}
Portugal (AFP)	Platinum	10,000^{‡}
Spain (Promusicae)	Platinum	60,000^{‡}
Switzerland (IFPI Switzerland)	2× Platinum	60,000^{‡}
United Kingdom (BPI)	2× Platinum	1,200,000^{‡}
United States (RIAA)	4× Platinum	4,000,000^{‡}
Streaming
Greece (IFPI Greece)	Platinum	2,000,000^{†}
Sweden (GLF)	Gold	4,000,000^{†}
^{‡} Sales+streaming figures based on certification alone.^{†} Streaming-only figures based on certification alone.

== Release history ==
Release history and formats for "Paint the Town Red"
Region	Date	Format	Label(s)	Ref.
Various	August 4, 2023	Digital download; streaming	Kemosabe; RCA	
United States	August 8, 2023	Contemporary hit radio	Kemosabe; RCA	
United States	August 8, 2023	Rhythmic radio	Kemosabe; RCA	
United States	August 8, 2023	Urban radio	Kemosabe; RCA	
Italy	August 25, 2023	Radio airplay	Sony	
