= Balut (song) =

Promotional single by Doja Cat

from the album Scarlet
- Released: September 15, 2023
- Recorded: 2022
- Genre: Lofi hip hop; boom bap
- Length: 3:27
- Label: Kemosabe; RCA
- Composers: Amala Zandile Dlamini; Ari David Starace; Kurtis McKenzie; Rogét Chahayed
- Lyricist: Amala Zandile Dlamini
- Producers: Yeti Beats; Rogét Chahayed

"Balut" is a song by American rapper and singer Doja Cat from her fourth studio album, Scarlet (2023). It was released on September 15, 2023, through Kemosabe and RCA Records as the third promotional single from the album. Written by Doja Cat, Y2K and Rogét Chahayed, who also produced the song with Yeti Beats, it is a downtempo boom bap song characterized by bass-heavy lofi beats and ethereal melodies.

== Background ==
The title "Balut" was first revealed in April 2023, when Doja Cat shared pictures of a whiteboard showing progress on the preliminary tracklist for what would later be her fourth studio album Scarlet. She then shared a snippet of the song while on an Instagram livestream in June 2023. Doja Cat announced the release date of the album on August 30, as well as the final tracklist on September 12, revealing "Balut" to be the fifteenth track on the album. "Balut" was surprise released as a promotional single on September 15, with no prior announcement. The song was written by Doja Cat and Y2K alongside Rogét Chahayed, who produced the song with Yeti Beats. Additional production credits also go to co-writer Kurtis McKenzie.

== Composition and lyrics ==
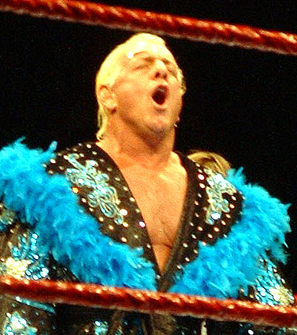
The track samples a quote from wrestler Ric Flair (pictured), also known as "I Da! Ba-Loot!"

Described as "slinky", "sultry" and "laid-back", "Balut" is a downtempo rap song characterized by a bass-heavy lo-fi beat and "ethereal, melodic flourishes" of piano. The song was noted to be inspired by boom bap and 1990s hip hop music. Lyrically, the song finds Doja Cat boasting about herself and her work from an "insightful but confident" perspective, setting herself apart from her peers. She also dismisses rumors and speculations such as drug use. She utilizes a "backpack rap" flow and a complex rhyme structure, in addition to her inclusion of metaphors and wordplay.

While the word balut is the name given to a popular Filipino delicacy commonly made from the embryo of a duck, Doja Cat claims she gave the song that name because "it signifies a bird that's being eaten alive". Doja Cat received backlash from Filipino listeners because balut is not, in fact, eaten live. The opening to the track samples a quote from American wrestler Ric Flair saying, "Remember this girl... None of you can be first, but all of you can be next. Woo!". The song could also have potentially gained its namesake from one of Flair's aliases, "I Da! Ba-Loot!".

== Critical reception ==
"Balut" received generally favorable reviews from contemporary music critics. Armon Sadler of Vibe wrote that Doja Cat "excels" and praised her "pure, gritty, '90s type of flow". Writing for HotNewHipHop, Alexander Cole also lauded her rapping, and wrote that it proves she is "incredibly talented and versatile". Several critics compared "Balut" to the work of alternative hip hop artists such as The Alchemist and others under the Griselda Records collective.

== Charts ==
Chart performance for "Balut"
Chart (2023)	Peak position
New Zealand Hot Singles (RMNZ)	10
US Bubbling Under Hot 100 (Billboard)	23
