= Agora Hills =

Single by Doja Cat

from the album Scarlet
- Released: October 31, 2023
- Recorded: 2023
- Studio: Harbor Studios, Malibu
- Genre: Hip-hop; pop; R&B
- Length: 4:25; 3:39 (radio edit)
- Label: Kemosabe; RCA
- Songwriter: Amala Zandile Dlamini
- Composers: Isaac Earl Bynum; Gentuar Memishi; Jean-Baptiste Kouame; Bennett Pepple; Brian Holland; Michael Lovesmith
- Producers: Earl on the Beat; Gent!; Jean Baptiste; Bangs

Doja Cat singles chronology
"Paint the Town Red" (2023)	"Agora Hills" (2023)	"N.H.I.E." (2024)

Music video
- "Agora Hills" on YouTube

"Agora Hills" is a song by American rapper and singer Doja Cat from her fourth studio album, Scarlet (2023). It was released along with the album on September 22, 2023, through Kemosabe and RCA Records as the second and final single from the album. A hip-hop, pop, and R&B-infused slow jam with a trap beat, it finds Doja Cat discussing the ways in which she wants to flaunt her partner, despite the pressures of fame and secrecy. Directed by Hannah Lux Davis, the accompanying music video is 1990s-inspired and sees her traversing an apocalyptic California landscape with her supernatural female friends. The song is named after Agoura Hills, which is a city in California.

The song received widespread acclaim from music critics, who lauded Doja Cat's unique vocal delivery and placed the song on several year-end lists. Commercially, it peaked at number seven on the Billboard Hot 100 and topped the Rhythmic Top 40 chart in the US, and was also a top 25 hit in the United Kingdom, Australia, Ireland, New Zealand, South Africa and the Philippines. For promotional purposes, Doja Cat performed the song during the Scarlet Tour, as well as on BBC Radio 1's Live Lounge concert series.

== Background and release ==
Doja Cat spent several of her formative years living in an ashram commune founded and led by jazz musician Alice Coltrane in Agoura Hills, a city in the Santa Monica Mountains of California. The purposeful misspelling of the title "Agora Hills" refers to the theme of agoraphilia, which is the love of public life, crowds, and activity, as suggested by song's lyrics about public display of affection. Doja Cat also adopts a Californian "valley girl" accent while rapping an entire verse of the song. Doja Cat recorded "Agora Hills" during a ten-day stint at Harbor Studios in Malibu, California. The song was produced by Earl on the Beat, Gent!, Jean Baptiste and Bangs, who all wrote the track alongside Doja Cat. Songwriting credits on the track also go to Brian Holland and Michael Lovesmith, who wrote the sampled "All I Do Is Think of You". Mastering and mixing was handled by studio personnel Mike Bozzi and Neal Pogue, respectively.

She first revealed the song's title in early April 2023, sharing a screenshot of the track as an audio file alongside two other songs to social media. Later that month, the title appeared again in a photo shared by the rapper of the preliminary tracklist of Scarlet (2023) while under development. Doja Cat began hinting the song's release after changing the location on her Twitter profile to "agora hills" in May 2023. On September 3, 2023, she shared a post on Instagram featuring her and the supporting cast at the song's music video shoot. Later that month, a snippet of the song was shared on her official website, and the release date was confirmed to be September 22. The song was released in tandem with Scarlet as the second single from the album. In the United States, it impacted rhythmic contemporary and contemporary hit radio on October 31.

== Composition and lyrics ==
"Agora Hills"
The hook of "Agora Hills", which is followed by a spoken-word interlude that segues into the first verse, rapped entirely in a valley girl accent.

"Agora Hills" is a song blending hip-hop, pop, and R&B. A "seductive" slow jam, the song is described as dreamy, mellow and atmospheric in nature. It is also characterized by a bouncy trap drum beat, spacey synthesizers and Doja Cat's breathy vocals. The instrumental of the song samples the introduction to "All I Do Is Think of You", a 1989 single by American R&B group Troop, originally recorded by The Jackson 5 in 1975. During the song's first verse, Doja Cat raps in a "valley girl" accent. The song also features "purposefully cringey" ad-libs, laughter and satiric spoken-word interludes in between the refrain and the chorus.

"Agora Hills" is a love song. In the song's lyrics, Doja Cat expresses the ways in which she wants to flaunt her partner and discusses her romantic feelings for this person. Furthermore, she calls for autonomy from the intrusions of fame, and tolls with the idea of publicizing a love she is forced to keep confidential. She fantasizes about public displays of affection (PDA) and performing fellatio on a penis in a bathroom, and mimics the "fun, confusing, slightly messy" initial stages of dating. While based around the topic of sex, the lyrics were noted to be bawdy, lighthearted and ironic.

== Critical reception ==
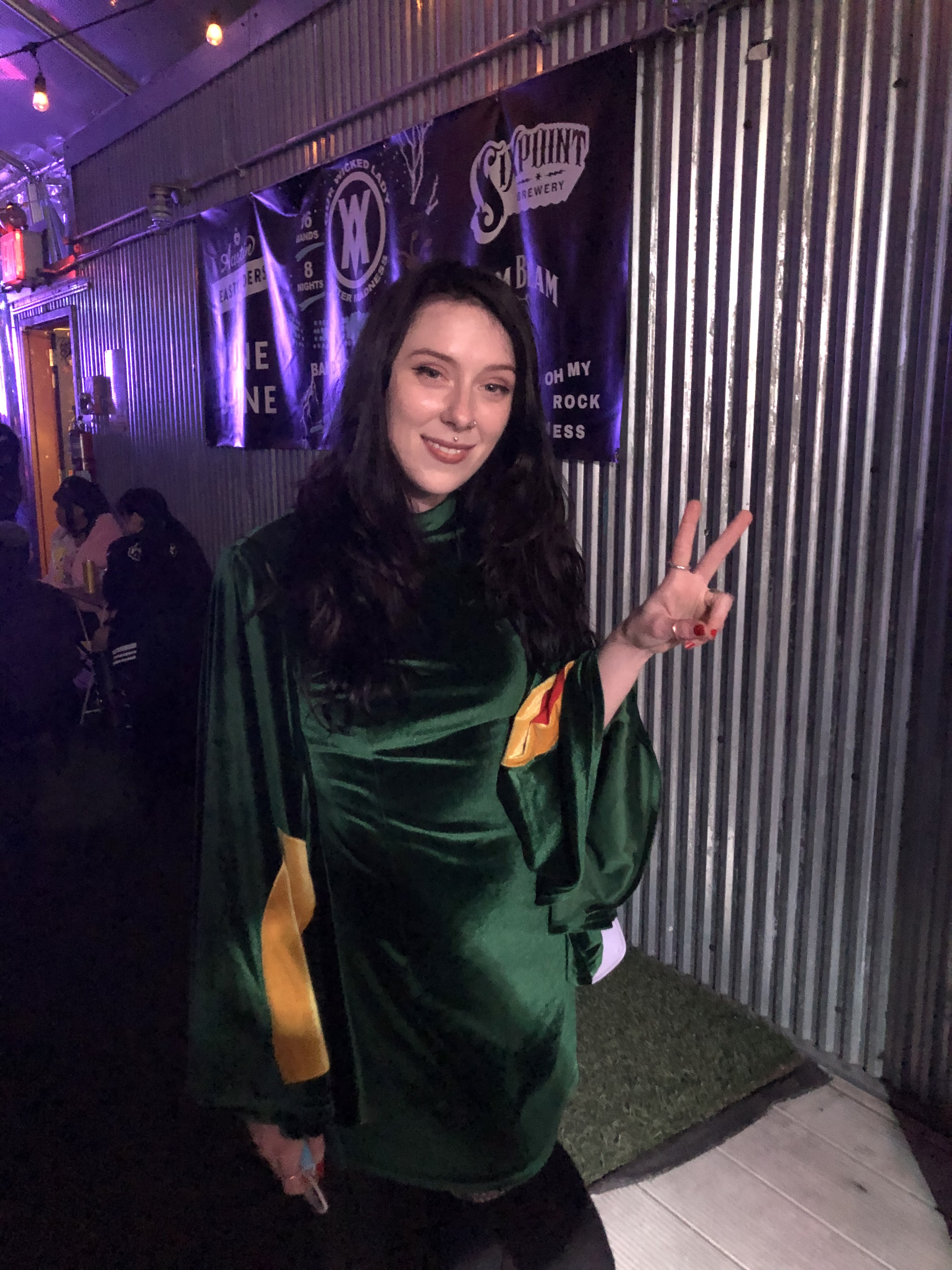
Several critics drew comparisons between "Agora Hills" and the early works of American rapper Kitty Pryde (pictured).

"Agora Hills" was met with widespread critical acclaim from contemporary music critics, who particularly praised her unique vocal delivery. Alex Gonzalez of Uproxx lauded "Agora Hills" as a reminder of Doja Cat's "multifaceted musical talents", praising her "soft-tinged vocals" as well as her "fire rap skills". Kyle Denis of Billboard ranked the song as the third best track on Scarlet, and similarly described Doja Cat as a "master shapeshifter" due to her ability to channel various characters using voices and accents. A number of critics likened her delivery on the track to that of American rapper Kitty Pryde, with several citing her "nervously languid" flow in her song "Okay Cupid" as an example.

[The song] demonstrates that Doja Cat is not always just about being belligerent or being kind of venomous to her haters or conjuring all this occult imagery. But she has a lot of different sides, and the album has a lot of different sides. So "Agora Hills" is a kind of quiet storm song. It's hazy. It's sensual. And it's her singing and rapping. What I love about this song is that it's way more estrogen than it is testosterone. This is what she would call her softy side. It's her singing about love, about romance.

— Jason King, All Things Considered.

=== Year-end lists ===
Select year-end rankings of "Agora Hills"
Publication	List	Rank	Ref.
Billboard	The 100 Best Songs of 2023 (Staff Picks)	82	
Business Insider	The Best Songs of 2023	20	
Los Angeles Times	The 100 Best Songs of 2023	9	
The New York Times	Best Songs of 2023	13	
NPR	The 123 Best Songs of 2023	—N/a	
Rolling Stone	The 15 Best Rap Songs of 2023	13	
Time Out	The 23 Best Songs of 2023	17	
Triple J	2023 Triple J Hottest 100	49	

== Music video ==
Co-directed by American filmmaker Hannah Lux Davis and Doja Cat herself, the official music video was released in tandem with the song and the album. The video opens with Doja Cat washing her body of the blood worn by her Scarlet alter ego in previous music videos, before cutting to a scene of her levitating in the aftermath of an apocalyptic disaster. The following scene is more serene, and sees her talking to her lover via telephone in a pastel-coloured bedroom resembling that of a teenage girl. She wears a number of outfits and is also seen in a dystopian mall setting as well as sat atop a sign that reads "Agora Hills". In several of the scenes, Doja Cat is seen amongst a group of other female characters played by micro-celebrities such as Aliyah's Interlude, Mette Narrative, Niohuru X, and Lil Mariko.

The video features cinematography from Kate Arizmendi and visual effects from the Frender collective. Together they utilised retro visuals and digital distortion techniques to purposefully introduce an element of degradation to certain shots. The video also makes use of fuzzy found footage as a film technique, and is characterized by its 1990s aesthetics. The visual effects team helped create the effect of Doja Cat levitating, in addition to designing an upside down world in the sky during the apocalyptic scenes. Davis described the video as "disconcertingly hot; shot in a liminal space and featuring a variety of versions of Doja herself embodying her different styles and personalities." The music video amassed over one million views on its first day of release. Critics noted that while the video was able to maintain some of the "horror" imagery depicted in the other Scarlet music videos, it was significantly more dreamy, "pink and soft" in nature, and that it perhaps resembled a new, less dark version of Doja Cat.

== Commercial performance ==
On the chart dated October 7, 2023, "Agora Hills" debuted at number 18 on the U.S. Billboard Hot 100 with 14.9 million streams and 1,300 digital downloads, becoming her thirteenth top 20 hit in the country. It rose to number 10 on the chart dated January 13, 2024, becoming her ninth top 10 hit in the country, before reaching its peak of seven approximately two weeks later. It also was her eighth song to top the Pop airplay chart and her eleventh song to top Billboard's Rhythmic Airplay chart, topping the list dated December 23, 2023. With this, she tied with Trinidadian rapper Nicki Minaj as the woman with the third most number ones on the chart, placing ninth overall.

Elsewhere, the song was a commercial success in Asia and Oceania, becoming a top 10 hit in Malaysia, India, Lebanon, Singapore, and the Philippines. It earned platinum certification status in Australia (by the Australian Recording Industry Association), and New Zealand (by Recorded Music NZ), where it peaked at number four on the NZ Singles Chart.

== Live performances ==
Doja Cat first performed "Agora Hills" among two other songs for the Live Lounge series by BBC Radio 1 in late October 2023. The song was included as the fifth track in the setlist of Doja Cat's The Scarlet Tour in North America in late 2023.

== Awards and nominations ==
Awards and nominations for "Agora Hills"
Organization	Year	Category	Result	Ref.
ASCAP Pop Music Awards	2025	Most-Performed Songs of the Year	Won	
ASCAP Rhythm & Soul Music Awards	2025	Most-Performed Songs of the Year	Won	
BET Awards	2024	Video of the Year	Nominated	
BET Awards	2024	Viewer's Choice Award	Nominated	
Billboard Music Awards	2024	Top Rap Song	Nominated	
BMI Pop Music Awards	2025	Most-Performed Songs of the Year	Won	
IHeartRadio Music Awards	2025	Song of the Year	Nominated	
IHeartRadio Music Awards	2025	Pop Song of the Year	Nominated	
iHeartRadio Titanium Awards	2025	One Billion Total Spins on iHeartRadio Stations	Won	

== Charts ==
=== Weekly charts ===
Weekly chart performance for "Agora Hills"
Chart (2023–2024)	Peak position
Australia (ARIA)	14
Australia Hip Hop/R&B (ARIA)	3
Canada Hot 100 (Billboard)	24
Canada CHR/Top 40 (Billboard)	9
France (SNEP)	142
Global 200 (Billboard)	17
Greece International (IFPI)	32
India International Singles (IMI)	6
Ireland (IRMA)	35
Lebanon (Lebanese Top 20)	9
Lithuania (AGATA)	26
Malaysia (Billboard)	5
Malaysia International (RIM)	3
MENA (IFPI)	20
Netherlands (Single Tip)	10
New Zealand (Recorded Music NZ)	4
Philippines (Billboard)	10
Portugal (AFP)	120
Singapore (RIAS)	5
South Africa (Billboard)	22
Sweden Heatseeker (Sverigetopplistan)	1
Switzerland (Schweizer Hitparade)	70
UAE (IFPI)	9
UK Singles (Official Charts)	23
UK Hip Hop/R&B (Official Charts)	6
US Billboard Hot 100	7
US Adult Pop Airplay (Billboard)	27
US Dance Airplay (Billboard)	26
US Hot R&B/Hip-Hop Songs (Billboard)	2
US Pop Airplay (Billboard)	1
US R&B/Hip-Hop Airplay (Billboard)	3
US Rhythmic Airplay (Billboard)	1
Vietnam (Vietnam Hot 100)	33

=== Year-end charts ===
Year-end chart performance for "Agora Hills"
Chart (2024)	Position
Australia Hip Hop/R&B (ARIA)	45
Canada (Canadian Hot 100)	83
Global 200 (Billboard)	115
US Billboard Hot 100	17
US Hot R&B/Hip-Hop Songs (Billboard)	7
US Rhythmic (Billboard)	2
US R&B/Hip-Hop Airplay (Billboard)	15
US Mainstream Top 40 (Billboard)	6

== Certifications ==
Certifications for "Agora Hills"
Region	Certification	Certified units/sales
Australia (ARIA)	Platinum	70,000^{‡}
Brazil (Pro-Música Brasil)	2× Platinum	80,000^{‡}
Canada (Music Canada)	3× Platinum	240,000^{‡}
France (SNEP)	Gold	100,000^{‡}
New Zealand (RMNZ)	3× Platinum	90,000^{‡}
Poland (ZPAV)	Gold	25,000^{‡}
United Kingdom (BPI)	Gold	400,000^{‡}
United States (RIAA)	2× Platinum	2,000,000^{‡}
^{‡} Sales+streaming figures based on certification alone.

== Release history ==
Release dates and formats for "Agora Hills"
Region	Date	Format	Label	Ref.
United States	October 31, 2023	Rhythmic contemporary radio	RCA	
United States	October 31, 2023	Contemporary hit radio	Kemosabe; RCA	
