= Square Biz =

1981 single by Teena Marie

Single by Teena Marie

from the album It Must Be Magic
- B-side: "Opus III (Does Anybody Care)"
- Released: 1981
- Genre: Funk; R&B
- Length: 6:26
- Label: Gordy
- Songwriters: Teena Marie, Allen McGrier
- Producer: Teena Marie

Teena Marie singles chronology
"Young Love" (1981)	"Square Biz" (1981)	"It Must Be Magic" (1981)

Audio
- "Square Biz" on YouTube

"Square Biz" is a 1981 song by American R&B singer, Teena Marie. Bass player and frequent collaborator Allen McGrier is credited as the co-writer along with Marie. The song was released as a single from the album It Must Be Magic, and became one of Marie's signature songs. The song includes a rap break, an unusual feature at the time.

== Cover versions and appearances in media ==
In 2002, a new version of this song, titled "Hollywood Square Biz", was used as the theme to the popular game show Hollywood Squares when it was known as H2 at the time from 2002 to 2004.

In 2000, the song "Crip Hop" (Tha Eastsidaz featuring Snoop Dogg), featured on the Baby Boy soundtrack and released by Universal Records on June 19, 2001, sampled Square Biz.

In 2002, En Vogue performed a cover of the song on their concert DVD, Live in the USA.

Missy Elliott uses an interpolation of a verse from Square Biz in Ciara's 2004 hit single, "1, 2 Step".

The Firm's "Firm Biz" contains a sample based on the song featuring Dawn Robinson from their first and only album The Album in 1997.

"Real Love" by Master P featuring Sera-Lynn, 2002.

In 2022, a cover of the song was performed by JoJo on YouTube.

== Chart performance ==
The song managed to peak at #3 on Billboard's R&B Charts, becoming Marie's highest peak on the chart at the time. The song managed to peak at #12 on Billboard's Club Play Singles, while performing moderately on Billboard's Pop Singles, peaking only at #50, becoming her second single to chart on the Pop Singles chart.

== Charts ==
Chart performance for "Square Biz"
Chart (1981)	Peak position
US Billboard Hot 100	50
US Dance Club Songs (Billboard)	12
US Hot R&B/Hip-Hop Songs (Billboard)	3
