= Y2K (music producer) =

American record producer (born 1994)

- Also known as: Y2K2Y
- Born: Ari David Starace; July 27, 1994 (age 32); Phoenix, Arizona, U.S.
- Genres: Hip hop; pop
- Occupations: Record producer; songwriter
- Instrument: Ableton Live
- Years active: 2013–present
- Label: Columbia

Ari David Starace (born July 27, 1994), known professionally as Y2K, is an American record producer and songwriter. He is best known for his hit song "Lalala", with Canadian rapper bbno$, which Y2K produced himself. He has also produced tracks for other prominent artists, most notably Adéla, BTS, Doja Cat, and Yung Gravy.

== Discography ==
=== Singles ===
Title	Year	Peak chart positions										Certifications
Title	Year	US	US R&B /HH	US Rap	AUS	CAN	FRA	IRL	NZ	SWE	UK	Certifications
"Lalala" (with bbno$ or with bbno$, Carly Rae Jepsen and Enrique Iglesias)	2019	55	22	19	16	10	12	36	16	55	32	RIAA: 3× Platinum; ARIA: 2× Platinum; BPI: Gold; MC: 5× Platinum; RMNZ: 2× Platinum; SNEP: Diamond
"Go Dumb" (with the Kid Laroi featuring Blackbear and Bankrol Hayden)	2020	—	—	—	—	—	—	—	— (Note: "Go Dumb" did not enter the NZ Top 40 Singles Chart, but peaked at number 29 on the NZ Hot Singles Chart.)	—	—	
"Oh No" (with Killy)	2020	—	—	—	—	—	—	—	—	—	—	
"Damage Is Done" (with JoJo)	2020	—	—	—	—	—	—	—	—	—	—	
"Wawawa" (with bbno$)	2020	—	—	—	—	—	—	—	—	—	—	
"Dirt" (with JPEGMafia)	2022	—	—	—	—	—	—	—	—	—	—	
"—" denotes releases that did not chart or were not released.

=== Produced by Y2K ===
Year	Artist	Album/EP	Title	Co-Producers
2016	Pollari	Yacht Club	How U Feel	—N/a
2016	lil aaron	GLOING PAIN$	NIGHTRIDER	Brenton Duvall, JUDGE & Dylan Brady
2016	lil aaron	GLOING PAIN$	SRONGER	Brenton Duvall, JUDGE & Dylan Brady
2016	lil aaron	GLOING PAIN$	4 MORE DRINKS / PINK FENTY SLIDES	Brenton Duvall, JUDGE & Dylan Brady
2016	lil aaron	GLOING PAIN$	NOBODY	Brenton Duvall, JUDGE & Dylan Brady
2016	lil aaron	GLOING PAIN$	DRUGS	Felix Snow, Brenton Duvall, JUDGE & Dylan Brady
2016	lil aaron	GLOING PAIN$	GO 2 HELL	Brenton Duvall, JUDGE, Aaron Zuckerman & Dylan Brady
2016	lil aaron	GLOING PAIN$	GLOING PAIN$	JUDGE, Polyphia, Brenton Duvall & Dylan Brady
2017	Polyphia	The Most Hated	Loud	Iophile, JUDGE & Scott LePage
2017	Polyphia	The Most Hated	Icronic	Iophile, JUDGE & Scott LePage
2017	Polyphia	The Most Hated	Goose	Iophile, JUDGE & Scott LePage
2017	Polyphia	The Most Hated	40Oz	Iophile, JUDGE & Scott LePage
2017	Polyphia	The Most Hated	Crosty	Iophile, JUDGE & Scott LePage
2017	Polyphia	The Most Hated	The Worst	Iophile, JUDGE & Scott LePage
2017	lil aaron	Non-album singles	HOT TOPIC	—N/a
2017	lil aaron	Non-album singles	TOP 8	—N/a
2017	lil aaron	Non-album singles	LIT	—N/a
2017	blackbear	do re mi X	do re mi (Y2K Remix)	—N/a
2017	Cali Cartier	Cali Cartier Best Rapper Last Album... Maybe HaHa!!	Options	—N/a
2017	Cali Cartier	Cali Cartier Best Rapper Last Album... Maybe HaHa!!	350Z	—N/a
2017	Cali Cartier	Cali Cartier Best Rapper Last Album... Maybe HaHa!!	Louis Kicks	Dylan Brady
2017	Smrtdeath	Non-album singles	Porcelain	—N/a
2017	Yo Gotti	Non-album singles	Rake It Up (Y2K Remix)	—N/a
2017	Ro Ransom	Momentum	See Me Fall (Y2K Remix)	—N/a
2017	Smrtdeath & lil aaron	Non-album singles	Smrtdeath & lil aaron	—N/a
2017	josh pan	Non-album singles	Selfish	JUDGE & Dylan Brady
2018	Lewis Grant	Make Me Scared Again (Deluxe Edition)	Bad Batch Pt. 2	JUDGE & Dylan Brady
2018	Lewis Grant	Make Me Scared Again (Deluxe Edition)	Daniel	Lewis Grant & Dylan Brady
2018	Myouçeej	Non-album single	Swum creeks	Myouçeej
2018	KILLY	KILLSTREAK	HELLRAISER	WondaGurl
2018	KILLY	Surrender Your Soul	Doomsday	WondaGurl
2018	KILLY	Surrender Your Soul	Pray for Me	WondaGurl
2018	KILLY	Surrender Your Soul	No Sad No Bad	—N/a
2018	Smrtdeath	Non-album singles	Caught Up	—N/a
2018	Nessly	Non-album singles	WHOHASIT (Y2K Remix)	—N/a
2018	lil aaron	ROCK$TAR FAMOUS	QUIT	Dr. Luke, Ryan Ogren & DallasK
2018	lil aaron	Non-album single	STUDDED GUCCI BELT	—N/a
2018	Polyphia	New Levels New Devils	G.O.A.T	JUDGE
2018	Polyphia	New Levels New Devils	O.D	JUDGE
2018	Polyphia	New Levels New Devils	Nasty	JUDGE
2018	Polyphia	New Levels New Devils	Yas	Tim Henson
2018	Polyphia	New Levels New Devils	Bad	Scott LePage
2018	Polyphia	New Levels New Devils	Death Note	Iophile
2018	Yung Bans	Yung Bans	Waterslide	—N/a
2018	Yung Bans	Yung Bans, Vol. 5	Ridin	Billy Cigarette
2018	Yung Bans	Head in the Clouds	Red Rubies	—N/a
2018	88rising, Rich Brian, Yung Bans, Young Pinch, Higher Brothers and Don Krez	Head in the Clouds	Red Rubies	—N/a
2018	Khary	Non-album singles	DEAD	Alexander Lewis
2018	bbno$	Non-album singles	money conversation	—N/a
2018	bbno$	recess	thankful	—N/a
2019	bbno$	recess	stucco	—N/a
2019	bbno$	Dream Eater	Lalala	—N/a
2019	bbno$	i don't care at all	pouch	—N/a
2019	bbno$	i don't care at all	slop	—N/a
2019	bbno$	i don't care at all	I DON'T CARE AT ALL CAUSE I GOT MONEY!!!!!!	—N/a
2019	bbno$	i don't care at all	bad thoughts	—N/a
2019	bbno$	i don't care at all	pop song	—N/a
2019	bbno$	i don't care at all	it gon'last	—N/a
2019	bbno$	i don't care at all	gone	—N/a
2019	Lil Mayo & bbno$	i don't care at all	jimmy neutron	—N/a
2019	Lewis Grant & bbno$	i don't care at all	on god	Lewis Grant
2019	Yung Gravy & Lil Mayo	Sensational	E.T	—N/a
2019	Yung Gravy, Pouya, Ramirez& TrippythaKid	Sensational	The Boys Are Back in Town	Yung Gravy & swvde
2019	Yung Gravy	Sensational	Charlene	Boston and Nick Seeley
2019	Yung Gravy	Sea Shanties for Thots	Tampa Bay Bustdown	—N/a
2019	Yung Gravy	Baby Gravy 2	shining on my ex	—N/a
2019	bbno$ & Yung Gravy	Baby Gravy 2	shining on my ex	—N/a
2019	Iann Dior	Industry Plant	Lately	Nick Mira
2020	Leyla Blue	Non-album single	Peppa Pig	—N/a
2020	Yung Gravy	Baby Gravy 2	Welcome to Chilis	Popnick
2020	Yung Gravy & bbno$	Baby Gravy 2	Myrtle Beach Summer 1974	—N/a
2020	Yung Gravy & bbno$	Baby Gravy 2	Bandsville	—N/a
2021	Doja Cat	Planet Her	Payday ft. Young Thug	N/A
2021	Doja Cat	Planet Her	Get Into It (Yuh)	Sully
2021	Doja Cat	Planet Her	I Don't Do Drugs ft. Ariana Grande	Sully
2021	Doja Cat	Planet Her	Options ft. JID	Mayer Hawthorne
2021	Doja Cat	Planet Her	Why Why ft. Gunna	Sully
2022	Polyphia	Remember That You Will Die	Playing God	—N/a
2022	Polyphia	Remember That You Will Die	Reverie	—N/a
2022	Polyphia	Remember That You Will Die	ABC (feat. Sophia Black)	—N/a
2022	Polyphia	Remember That You Will Die	Chimera (feat. Lil West)	—N/a
2023	Doja Cat	Scarlet	Attention	Rogét Chahayed
2025	Doja Cat	Vie	Jealous Type	Jack Antonoff
2025	ADÉLA	The Provocateur	Go	Dylan Brady
2026	BTS	ARIRANG	they don't know 'bout us	Pdogg, Ghstloop
