= Attention (Doja Cat song) =

- Updated digital artwork

Promotional single by Doja Cat

from the album Scarlet
- Released: June 16, 2023
- Recorded: 2022–2023
- Genre: Hip hop; trip hop; funk
- Length: 4:37
- Label: Kemosabe; RCA
- Songwriters: Amala Zandile Dlamini; Ari David Starace; Rogét Chahayed
- Producers: Y2K; Rogét Chahayed

Music video
- "Attention" on YouTube

"Attention" is a song by American rapper and singer Doja Cat. Written alongside producers Rogét Chahayed and Y2K, it was released on June 16, 2023, through Kemosabe and RCA Records as the first promotional single from her fourth studio album Scarlet, alongside a music video directed by Tanu Muino.

Marking a departure from what she described as "cash-grabs" and "mediocre pop", "Attention" is a 1990s-inspired hip hop song with a trip hop beat in which Doja Cat addresses numerous criticisms and controversies surrounding her, including changes in her appearance, her social media presence, and comparisons to Nicki Minaj. It entered the top 40 of the charts in the United States, United Kingdom, Ireland, Australia and New Zealand.

"Attention" received two nominations at the 66th Annual Grammy Awards including Best Melodic Rap Performance and Best Rap Song.

== Background ==
Doja Cat's second and third studio albums, the pop-oriented Hot Pink and Planet Her, were released in 2019 and 2021, respectively. They both received critical and commercial success and peaked in the top-10 of the Billboard 200. Doja Cat later tweeted in April 2023 that most of her rap verses were "mid and corny" and that she would no longer be making pop music while, in May 2023, she tweeted that both of the aforementioned albums were "cash-grabs" and "mediocre pop". In August 2022, she shaved both her head and her eyebrows during an Instagram Live, which received criticism from fans online, many of whom believed she was suffering from a mental health crisis and looked "unfuckable". She responded to the criticism in a tweet later that month, writing to fans that wanted her to "look fuckable", "Go fuck yourselves." In an interview with Variety, Doja Cat said that her fourth studio album would be more focused on hip hop and would have a "more masculine direction".

On April 17, 2023, Doja Cat shared snippets of various songs on Instagram Live and posted a list of 19 tracks considered for her upcoming album, including "Attention". On May 24, she began teasing her album with tweets pairing a drop of blood emoji with the missives "scarlet was here" and "scarlet's watching," followed by "let myself heal, scar finally sealed." On June 12, the pre-save link for "Attention" leaked early; the following day, Doja Cat officially announced the song, alongside placeholder cover art depicting an upside-down "A" drawn in blood and its release date of June 16, 2023. The song was also made available to pre-order for digital download and as a CD single. "Attention" was released through RCA Records and Kemosabe Records as Doja Cat's first solo release of 2023, as her second release in 2023 overall following her feature on a remix of SZA's 2023 song "Kill Bill", and as her first solo release since "Vegas", which was included in the soundtrack for the Baz Luhrmann-directed biopic, Elvis, in 2022. "Attention" was produced by Y2K and Rogét Chahayed and written by both with Doja Cat. It appeared on Doja Cat's fourth studio album, Scarlet. She described it on an Instagram livestream as "not really a song, [but] more of, like, a piece — it's a message" which is "not really supposed to be replayed", but rather something that "would be a nice way to start off the whole rollout".

== Composition and lyrics ==
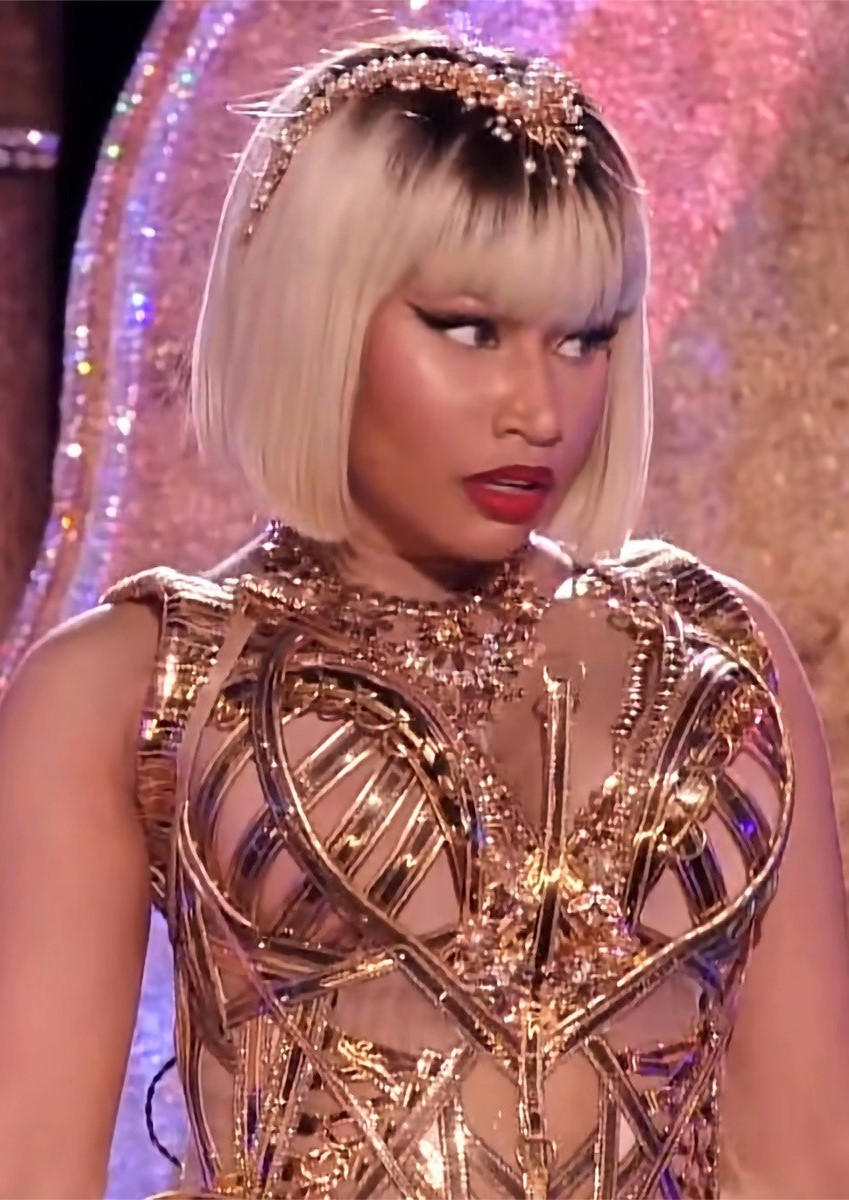
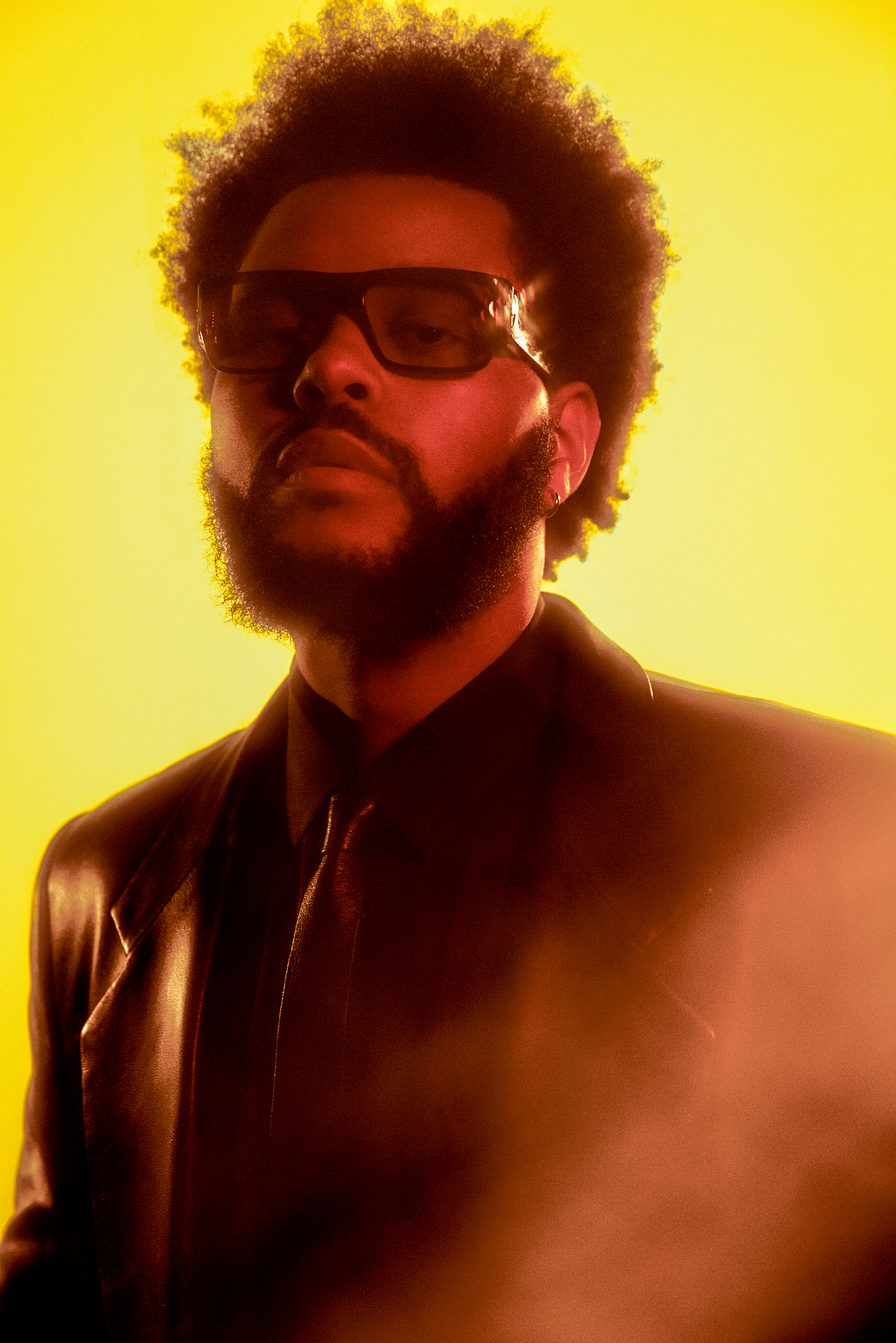
On "Attention", Doja Cat addresses comparisons of her to fellow rapper Nicki Minaj (left) and her decision to back out as an opener on the Weeknd's (right) After Hours til Dawn Tour in 2022

"Attention" is a midtempo hip hop and trip hop song with production inspired by 1990s hip hop and jazz. Its focus on rapping differed from Doja Cat's previously pop-focused musical output. It begins with the sounds of a harp and a loon's call before transitioning into a "dreamy" chorus sung by Doja Cat over a boom bap breakbeat, with lyrics ostensibly describing her vagina as a docile pet: "Baby, if you like it, just reach out and pet it/This one doesn't bite, it doesn't get aggressive/Show you how to touch it, hold it like it's precious/It don't need your loving, it just needs attention". The first verse addresses her decision to withdraw as an opener from the North American leg of the Weeknd's 2022 After Hours til Dawn Tour due to her tonsil surgery ("I could've been an opener, I redirect the bookin") and criticisms of her shaved head and weight loss ("Lost a lil' weight, but I ain't never lost a tushy/Lookin' good, but now my bald head match my [pussy]") and her social media ("Talk your shit about me, I can easily disprove it, it's stupid/You follow me, but you don't really care about the music"). She also addresses those who pretend to be her fans and express feigned concern for her mental wellbeing ("I readed all the comments saying, 'D, I'm really shooketh'/'D, you need to see a therapist, is you looking'") and the money and attention that they get when she decides to respond to their criticisms online ("You're lucky 'cause I just paid your bill with a reply"). In the second verse, Doja Cat raps about rappers who "fall into beef" with other rappers and dismisses comparisons of her to Nicki Minaj, who she refers to as "the hottest". Doja Cat later called online accusations that this was a diss toward Cardi B a "reach" in a tweet posted soon after the song's release.

Steffanee Wang of Nylon summarized the lyrics of "Attention" as being about "what it means to be a popstar in 2023: putting yourself up unconditionally for other people's consumption, being at the mercy of your fans and haters". Kyann-Sian Williams of NME called the song "haunting" and "vicious", while Slant's Sal Cinquemani compared Doja Cat's flow on the song to that of Lauryn Hill. For The Face, Olive Pometsey wrote, "'Attention' appears to be an attempt [for Doja Cat] to assert herself as a 'proper' rapper, stripping away any pop production to leave the spotlight on her bars.

== Critical reception ==
The song received critical acclaim upon release. For The A.V. Club, Hattie Lindert praised Doja Cat's delivery on the song as "calm, confident, and freshly invigorated" and called the first verse on "Attention" "one of [Doja Cat's] strongest verses in a minute". Lindert also stated that Doja Cat's "talents on the mic"—writing that she was "rapping more skillfully than ever" on "Attention"—and her being comfortable "inching away from pop stardom" suggested that a change in her musical style "could be good for the music". Thomas Galindo of American Songwriter called the song's verses "powerful" and "impressive".

== Commercial performance ==
"Attention" debuted at number 31 on the US Billboard Hot 100 on the chart dated July 1, 2023. "Attention" debuted at number 30 on the ARIA Singles Chart for the week dated June 26, 2023, giving her her 21st entry on the chart overall and her first entry in the chart's top 50 since "I Like You (A Happier Song)", her collaboration with Post Malone, peaked at number seven in June 2022. On the UK Singles Chart, "Attention" debuted at number 37 to become her 14th top-40 on the chart.

== Music video ==
The music video for "Attention", directed by Tanu Muino, was released concurrently with the song. It begins with Doja Cat driving into a crowd of crazed fans and paparazzi, whose faces become distorted as flashbulbs appear. She then starts walking down a busy street in Los Angeles at night in a white t-shirt, a leather duster, low-rise flared jeans, and seven chain necklaces, as she avoids belligerent passersby and street vendors and later walks past pedestrians wearing mangled, flesh-colored masks. Doja Cat also appears naked and covered in blood in several brief scenes in the video, while dancing naked in a kaleidoscopic lens in other scenes.

== Accolades ==
Awards and nominations for "Attention"
Organization	Year	Category	Result	Ref.
MTV Video Music Awards	2023	Video of the Year	Nominated	
MTV Video Music Awards	2023	Best Direction	Nominated	
MTV Video Music Awards	2023	Best Art Direction	Won	
Grammy Awards	2024	Best Melodic Rap Performance	Nominated	
Grammy Awards	2024	Best Rap Song	Nominated	

== Track listings ==
- Digital download and streaming
1. "Attention" – 4:37
- CD single
1. "Attention" – 4:37
2. "Attention" (Clean)
3. "Attention" (Instrumental)

== Credits and personnel ==
Song credits

- Doja Cat – vocals, songwriting
- Rogét Chahayed – songwriting, production
- Y2K – songwriting, production
- Connor Hedge – recording engineer
- Rian Lewis – recording engineer
- Assistant Recording Engineer
  - Trevor Taylor
  - Ivan Handwerk
  - Abbe Lewis
  - Katie Harvey
  - Mayer Hawthorne
- Jeff Ellis Worldwide – mixing engineer
- Dale Becker – mastering engineer

Music video credits

- Production Company – Underwonder Content
- Tanu Muino – director
- Braden Anderson – assistant director
- Nikita Kuzmenko – director of photography
- Robert Katz – producer
- Frank Borin – executive producer
- Ivanna Borin – executive producer
- Titica – post producer
- Briana Goldberg – producer manager
- Spencer Graves – production designer
- Joseph Bicknell – video colorist
- Carlos Font Clos – video editor
- Charles Lenz – video key grip operator
- Scott Moody – video gaffer
- Tilt VFX & Roma VFX – video Vfx
- Frender – video additional Vfx
- Max Colt – video additional Vfx superior

== Charts ==
Chart performance for "Attention"
Chart (2023)	Peak position
Australia (ARIA)	30
Australia Hip Hop/R&B (ARIA)	10
Canada Hot 100 (Billboard)	29
Global 200 (Billboard)	28
Greece International (IFPI)	27
Ireland (IRMA)	27
Japan Hot Overseas (Billboard Japan)	18
Lithuania (AGATA)	26
Netherlands (Single Tip)	10
New Zealand (Recorded Music NZ)	16
Portugal (AFP)	102
Sweden Heatseeker (Sverigetopplistan)	19
UK Singles (Official Charts)	37
UK Hip Hop/R&B (Official Charts)	12
US Billboard Hot 100	31
US Hot R&B/Hip-Hop Songs (Billboard)	11
US Pop Airplay (Billboard)	39
US Rhythmic Airplay (Billboard)	25

== Certifications ==
Certifications for "Attention"
Region	Certification	Certified units/sales
Brazil (Pro-Música Brasil)	Gold	20,000^{‡}
Canada (Music Canada)	Gold	40,000^{‡}
^{‡} Sales+streaming figures based on certification alone.

== Release history ==
Release dates and formats for "Attention"
Region	Date	Format(s)	Label(s)	Ref.
Various	June 16, 2023	Digital download; streaming	Kemosabe; RCA	
United States	June 16, 2023	CD single	Kemosabe; RCA	
