= Cinespia =

Film screening organization in Los Angeles

- Founded: 2002
- Founder: John Wyatt
- Type: Film
- Location: Los Angeles, California, United States
- Website: cinespia.org

Cinespia is an organization that hosts on-site screenings of classic films in and around Los Angeles, California. Launched in 2002, Cinespia shows films from the 1930s through the 1990s mostly in open-air settings at historic locations. Its most popular series runs weekly from May through September on Saturday (and occasionally Sunday) nights at the Hollywood Forever Cemetery. In addition, it screens films, both contemporary and canonical, at other locations throughout the year.

The al fresco Hollywood Forever screenings take place on the Fairbanks Lawn, so named for the adjacent crypt housing both Douglas Fairbanks, Sr. and Jr., and films are digitally projected against the west wall of the Cathedral Mausoleum, which houses the crypt of Rudolph Valentino among many others. Up to 3,500 patrons per screening bring blankets, pillows, picnic dinners, alcoholic beverages and candles and enjoy screenings under the stars, while a staff of 35 keep things running smoothly. DJs play music before and after the screenings over a portable sound system, and guest DJs have included Carlos Niño, Andy Votel, Cut Chemist, the Gaslamp Killer, Dam-Funk, Peanut Butter Wolf and members of the Numero Group and Dublab collectives.

Cinespia has appeared in the 2008 Best of L.A. issue of the LA Weekly and was named on the "16 Best Things in L.A." by Los Angeles magazine. According to Vanity Fair: "Cinespia captures the excitement of a drive-in movie date night of the 1950s but with a decidedly campy twist."

== History ==
The series was the brainchild of John Wyatt, a set designer then in his mid-twenties. A student of influential film lecturer Jim Hosney at the Crossroads School in Santa Monica, California, Wyatt initially formed an Italian cinema club with friend Richard Petit, of which Cinespia is a natural evolution. Both Wyatt and Petit were working for designer Brad Dunning at the time who was helping with the restoration of the Hollywood Forever Cemetery.

The name Cinespia is a portmanteau word from the Italian cine, or "movie theater," and the third person singular conjugation of the verb spiare, meaning "to observe," or more commonly, "to spy." Conjoined, cinespia was intended to suggest a film enthusiast or "watcher of films," although the actual term for film buff in Italian is cinofilo. Cinespia, by contrast, means literally "he spies in the movie theater" or "cinema spy."

After attending a Valentino birthday celebration at the Hollywood Forever Cemetery in 2002, Wyatt approached the owners through a friend who worked there and arranged a screening of Alfred Hitchcock's Strangers on a Train on July 20, 2002 using two 35mm projectors with a changeover mechanism on the back of a pickup truck. Eighty people showed up for the initial screening, and a follow-up screening of Sam Fuller's Pickup on South Street brought out an audience of a thousand. They showed four films the first season, favoring mid-century classics that might be rediscovered by a younger audience, and roughly 25 films every summer thereafter.

== Hollywood Forever Cemetery ==
Hollywood Cemetery, formerly Hollywood Memorial Park Cemetery, paralleled the rise of the film industry with its founding in 1899, but was in significant disrepair by the time it was purchased by Tyler Cassity in 1998. According to Wyatt, the cemetery was "dilapidated, overgrown, totally closed when the current owners took over," and money from the screenings helped to restore it to its original beauty.

The cemetery, located south of Santa Monica Blvd. between Gower St. and Van Ness Ave., shares a common wall with Paramount Studios, the last of the classical studios still to be located in Hollywood. The concentration of Hollywood talent interred there made it a natural setting for the hallmarks of a century of cinematic achievement. Among the film legends laid to rest within the confines of its 65 acres, as outlined by Matthew Duersten in the LA Weekly on the occasion of the introductory screening, are the following:

"Marion Davies, who perhaps knew the real secret to how Thomas Ince died on Hearst's boat; Bugsy Siegel and Harry Cohn, gangsters of different stripes but of twin hearts; Carl "Alfalfa" Switzer, who was shot to death in a fight over a $50 dog reward; Col. Griffith J. Griffith, who blew a hole in his wife's head after accusing her of conspiring with the pope against the U.S. government; Virginia Rappe, violated by a Coke bottle that punctured her bladder during a party in Fatty Arbuckle's suite at San Francisco's St. Francis Hotel; and director William Desmond Taylor, next to the Black Dahlia, perhaps Hollywood's greatest unsolved killing." To that list might be added Barbara La Marr, Hollywood's first high-profile drug casualty, and Lana Clarkson, gunshot victim of Phil Spector.

Other famous denizens permanently resting within earshot include Tyrone Power (Witness for the Prosecution), John Huston (The Maltese Falcon), Dee Dee and Johnny Ramone (Rock and Roll High School), Peter Finch (Network), Victor Fleming (The Wizard of Oz), Janet Gaynor (A Star Is Born), Curtis Harrington (Night Tide), Zoltan Korda (The Thief of Bagdad), Darren McGavin (The Man with the Golden Arm), Adolphe Menjou (Paths of Glory), Paul Muni (Scarface), Dudley Nichols (Stagecoach), Maila Nurmi (Plan 9 from Outer Space), Nelson Riddle (Lolita), Vito Scotti (The Godfather), Ann Sheridan (They Drive by Night), Constance and Norma Talmadge (Intolerance, Camille), Eddie Little (Another Day in Paradise), Eddie Bunker (Straight Time), Gregg Toland (Citizen Kane), Edgar G. Ulmer (Detour), Peter Lorre (Casablanca), Clifton Webb (Laura), William Hurlbut (Bride of Frankenstein) and Fay Wray (King Kong), any number of whose films have screened at the cemetery.

According to Wyatt, "All the people who worked on these films, starred in these films and were the small fry on these films: If there were an afterlife and they are here, I'm sure they would love to be seeing these films and all the people cheering and laughing at their lines."

== Series Highlights ==
Numerous celebrities and filmmakers have shown up to introduce screenings: Tatum O'Neal for Paper Moon; Paul Reubens for Pee-wee's Big Adventure; Amy Heckerling and Drew Barrymore for Fast Times at Ridgemont High; Karen Black for Easy Rider; Alicia Silverstone and Breckin Meyer for Clueless; Richard Rush for The Stunt Man; Charlie Ahearn, Fab Five Freddy and Patti Astor for Wild Style; Kenneth Anger for a program of his short films; and the real Henry Hill for Goodfellas. Michael Mann and Jon Voight were pictured in the audience in a photo that appeared in USA Today.

Cinespia showed The T.A.M.I. Show as the opening night screening of the 2008 Don't Knock the Rock Festival, the music-themed film festival organized by filmmaker Allison Anders. The performer Dam-Funk played a live set before a screening of Purple Rain. Pilots for the TV series Pushing Daisies (ABC) and Ghost Whisperer (CBS) were screened for an industry audience. Other memorable screenings have included Sunset Blvd. (filmed several hundred feet away on the Paramount lot, with Hollywood Forever denizen Cecil B. DeMille playing himself and references to Fairbanks and Valentino); The Holy Mountain, kept out of circulation for 35 years by the Beatles' manager Allen Klein (a benefit for the retiring Jim Hosney); The Wizard of Oz, on what would have been the 95th birthday of star and cemetery denizen Judy Garland; Singin' in the Rain; Chinatown; and logical thematic tie-in Night of the Living Dead.

In recent years, Cinespia has expanded its screenings to include other venues. A semi-regular series was launched in 2008 at the open-air pool of the Hollywood Roosevelt Hotel on Hollywood Boulevard in conjunction with the Masses, an arts collective and directors agency. A screening of the Werner Herzog 3-D documentary Cave of Forgotten Dreams was held at the Natural History Museum of Los Angeles County on April 23, 2011, co-sponsored by Cinefamily and the Silent Movie Theater, as part of the MOCA retrospective "Art in the Streets." (The implicit connection was that the 30,000-year-old Chauvet-Pont-d'Arc cave paintings depicted in the film were ostensibly the first recorded example of street graffiti.)
