= List of awards and nominations received by Doja Cat =

Doja Cat awards and nominations
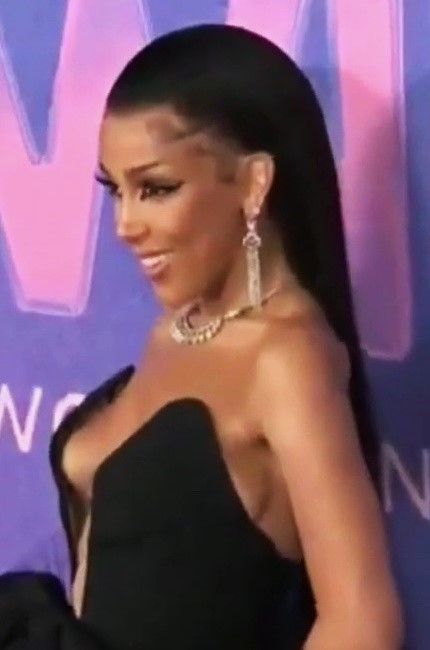
- Doja Cat at the 2022 Billboard Women in Music, where she was honored with the Powerhouse Award for 'dominating the year in streaming, sales and radio'.
Awards and nominations
Award	Wins	Nominations
American Music Awards	5	11
Billboard Music Awards	6	23
Grammy Awards	1	19
MTV Video Music Awards	6	27
iHeartRadio Music Awards (Note: Including iHeartRadio Titanium Awards.)	8	33
NAACP Image Awards	2	5
NRJ Music Awards	1	3
MTV Europe Music Awards	2	16
MTV Video Music Awards Japan	1	1
Clio Awards	20	20
BMI Awards (Note: BMI Pop Awards, BMI R&B/Hip-Hop Awards and BMI London Awards, as a songwriter and as a publisher.)	46	46
People Choice Awards	1	9
Spotify Plaques	7	7
Billboard Women in Music	1	1
The One Show Awards	19	19
Webby Awards	4	6

Totals (Note: Certain award groups do not simply award one winner. They acknowledge several different recipients, have runners-up, and have third place. Since this is a specific recognition and is different from losing an award, runner-up mentions are considered wins in this award tally. For simplification and to avoid errors, each award in this list has been presumed to have had a prior nomination.)
- Wins: 268
- Nominations: 498

American rapper and singer Doja Cat has won over 325 awards, including one Grammy Award, six Billboard Music Awards, five American Music Awards (AMAs), six MTV Video Music Awards (VMAs) and eight iHeartRadio Music Awards (including 6 Titanium Awards for over 1 billion spins on iHeartRadio stations).

After the largely ignored rollout of her debut studio album, Amala (2018), Doja Cat released Hot Pink on November 7, 2019, through Kemosabe and RCA Records. It received nominations for Favorite Soul/R&B Album at the 48th annual AMAs, and Top R&B Album at the 2021 Billboard Music Awards. Its lead single—a remix of "Juicy" featuring rapper Tyga—was her first entry into Billboard's Hot 100 chart, and was nominated for Top R&B Song at the 2020 Billboard Music Awards. "Say So", another single from Hot Pink, reached number one on the Hot 100 following a remix with rapper Nicki Minaj, which gave Minaj and Doja Cat a Guinness World Record for becoming the first female rap duo to top the chart. "Say So" received a Song of the Year nomination at the 2020 VMAs. During the same year, its music video was nominated for a "Video of the Year" accolade two times: from the AMAs and the BET Awards. In 2021, "Say So" received multiple nominations, including Record of the Year and Best Pop Solo Performance at the 63rd Annual Grammy Awards.

== Awards and nominations ==
List of award nominations, with the year of ceremony, nominee or work, category, and result
Organization	Year (Note: Indicates the year of ceremony. Each year is linked to the article about the awards held that year, wherever possible.)	Category	Nominated work	Result	Ref.
Ad Age Creativity Awards	2023	Best Use of TikTok	Doja Cat x Taco Bell: The Anti-Hero	Won	
Ad Age Small Agency Awards	2022	Silver Award – Digital Campaign	DojaCode	Won	
American Music Awards	2020	New Artist of the Year	Herself	Won	
American Music Awards	2020	Favorite Female Soul/R&B Artist	Herself	Won	
American Music Awards	2020	Favorite Soul/R&B Album	Hot Pink	Nominated	
American Music Awards	2020	Video of the Year	"Say So"	Nominated	
American Music Awards	2021	Favorite Pop/Rock Female Artist	Herself	Nominated	
American Music Awards	2021	Favorite Soul/R&B Female Artist	Herself	Won	
American Music Awards	2021	Favorite Soul/R&B Album	Planet Her	Won	
American Music Awards	2021	Collaboration of the Year	"Kiss Me More" (featuring SZA)	Won	
American Music Awards	2021	Favorite Pop/Rock Song	"Kiss Me More" (featuring SZA)	Nominated	
American Music Awards	2022	Favorite Pop Female Artist	Herself	Nominated	
American Music Awards	2022	Favorite R&B Female Artist	Herself	Nominated	
ARIA Music Awards	2021	Best International Artist	Planet Her	Nominated	
Asian Pop Music Awards	2025	Record of the Year	"Born Again" (Lisa featuring Doja Cat and Raye)	Nominated	
Berlin Music Video Awards	2026	Best Art Direction	"Jealous Type"	Nominated	
BET Awards	2020	Video of the Year	"Say So"	Nominated	
BET Awards	2020	Best Female Hip Hop Artist	Herself	Nominated	
BET Awards	2021	Best Female Hip Hop Artist	Herself	Nominated	
BET Awards	2022	Best Female Hip Hop Artist	Herself	Nominated	
BET Awards	2022	Best Female R&B/Pop Artist	Herself	Nominated	
BET Awards	2022	Album of the Year	Planet Her	Nominated	
BET Awards	2022	Video of the Year	"Kiss Me More" (featuring SZA)	Nominated	
BET Awards	2022	Best Collaboration	"Kiss Me More" (featuring SZA)	Nominated	
BET Awards	2022	BET Her Award	"Woman"	Nominated	
BET Awards	2024	Best Female Hip-Hop Artist	Herself	Nominated	
BET Awards	2024	Best Female R&B/Pop Artist	Herself	Nominated	
BET Awards	2024	Video of the Year	"Agora Hills"	Nominated	
BET Awards	2024	Viewer's Choice Award	"Agora Hills"	Nominated	
BET Awards	2025	Best Female Hip Hop Artist	Herself	Nominated	
BET Awards	2026	Best Female Hip Hop Artist	Herself	Nominated	
BET Awards	2026	Best Collaboration	"Go Girl" (with Summer Walker and Latto)	Pending	
BET Awards	2026	BET Her Award	"Go Girl" (with Summer Walker and Latto)	Nominated	
BET Awards	2026	BET Her Award	"Gorgeous"	Nominated	
BET Hip Hop Awards	2021	Best Live Performer	Herself	Nominated	
BET Hip Hop Awards	2021	Best Hip Hop Video	"Best Friend" (Saweetie featuring Doja Cat)	Nominated	
BET Hip Hop Awards	2022	Best Live Performer	Herself	Nominated	
BET Hip Hop Awards	2022	Hip Hop Artist of the Year	Herself	Nominated	
BET Hip Hop Awards	2022	Impact Track	"Woman"	Nominated	
BET Hip Hop Awards	2024	Video Director of the Year	Doja Cat & Nina McNeely	Nominated	
BET Hip Hop Awards	2024	Song of the Year	"Agora Hills"	Nominated	
Big Apple Awards	2023	Best Use of Owned Social Media	"Doja Introduces Jibble"	Won	
Billboard Music Awards	2020	Top R&B Song	"Juicy" (with Tyga)	Nominated	
Billboard Music Awards	2021	Top New Artist	Herself	Nominated	
Billboard Music Awards	2021	Top R&B Artist	Herself	Nominated	
Billboard Music Awards	2021	Top R&B Female Artist	Herself	Won	
Billboard Music Awards	2021	Top R&B Album	Hot Pink	Nominated	
Billboard Music Awards	2021	Top R&B Song	"Say So"	Nominated	
Billboard Music Awards	2022	Top Artist	Herself	Nominated	
Billboard Music Awards	2022	Top Female Artist	Herself	Nominated	
Billboard Music Awards	2022	Top Hot 100 Artist	Herself	Nominated	
Billboard Music Awards	2022	Top Streaming Artist	Herself	Nominated	
Billboard Music Awards	2022	Top Radio Songs Artist	Herself	Nominated	
Billboard Music Awards	2022	Top Billboard Global 200 Artist	Herself	Nominated	
Billboard Music Awards	2022	Top R&B Artist	Herself	Won	
Billboard Music Awards	2022	Top R&B Female Artist	Herself	Won	
Billboard Music Awards	2022	Top Billboard 200 Album	Planet Her	Nominated	
Billboard Music Awards	2022	Top R&B Album	Planet Her	Won	
Billboard Music Awards	2022	Top Hot 100 Song	"Kiss Me More" (featuring SZA)	Nominated	
Billboard Music Awards	2022	Top Collaboration	"Kiss Me More" (featuring SZA)	Nominated	
Billboard Music Awards	2022	Top Viral Song	"Kiss Me More" (featuring SZA)	Won	
Billboard Music Awards	2022	Top R&B Song	"You Right" (with the Weeknd)	Nominated	
Billboard Music Awards	2024	Top Radio Songs Artist	Herself	Nominated	
Billboard Music Awards	2024	Top Rap Female Artist	Herself	Won	
Billboard Music Awards	2024	Top Rap Song	"Agora Hills"	Nominated	
Billboard Music Awards	2024	Top Rap Song	"Paint the Town Red"	Nominated	
Billboard Women in Music	2022	Powerhouse Award	Herself	Won	
BMI London Awards	2023	Song of the Year	"Woman"	Won	
BMI London Awards	2023	Most Performed Songs of the Year	"Woman"	Won	
BMI London Awards	2023	Most Performed Songs of the Year	"Ain't Shit"	Won	
BMI London Awards	2023	Most Performed Songs of the Year	"Vegas"	Won	
BMI Pop Publishing Awards (Note: As her own publishing label "Doja Cat Music".)	2021	Most Performed Songs of the Year	"Say So"	Won	
BMI Pop Publishing Awards	2021	Most Performed Songs of the Year	"Like That" (featuring Gucci Mane)	Won	
BMI Pop Publishing Awards	2022	Most Performed Songs of the Year	"Kiss Me More" (featuring SZA)	Won	
BMI Pop Publishing Awards	2023	Most Performed Songs of the Year	"Get Into It (Yuh)"	Won	
BMI Pop Publishing Awards	2023	Most Performed Songs of the Year	I Like You (Post Malone featuring Doja Cat)	Won	
BMI Pop Publishing Awards	2023	Most Performed Songs of the Year	"Need to Know"	Won	
BMI Pop Publishing Awards	2023	Most Performed Songs of the Year	"Vegas"	Won	
BMI Pop Publishing Awards	2023	Most Performed Songs of the Year	"Woman"	Won	
BMI Pop Publishing Awards	2023	Most Performed Songs of the Year	"You Right" (with the Weeknd)	Won	
BMI Pop Publishing Awards	2024	Most Performed Songs of the Year	"Paint the Town Red"	Won	
BMI Pop Publishing Awards	2025	Most Performed Songs of the Year	"Agora Hills"	Won	
BMI Pop Songwriting Awards	2021	Most Performed Songs of the Year	"Say So"	Won	
BMI Pop Songwriting Awards	2021	Most Performed Songs of the Year	"Like That" (featuring Gucci Mane)	Won	
BMI Pop Songwriting Awards	2022	Most Performed Songs of the Year	"Kiss Me More" (featuring SZA)	Won	
BMI Pop Songwriting Awards	2023	Songwriter of the Year	Herself	Won	
BMI Pop Songwriting Awards	2023	Most Performed Songs of the Year	"Get Into It (Yuh)"	Won	
BMI Pop Songwriting Awards	2023	Most Performed Songs of the Year	"I Like You (A Happier Song)" (Post Malone featuring Doja Cat)	Won	
BMI Pop Songwriting Awards	2023	Most Performed Songs of the Year	"Need to Know"	Won	
BMI Pop Songwriting Awards	2023	Most Performed Songs of the Year	"Vegas"	Won	
BMI Pop Songwriting Awards	2023	Most Performed Songs of the Year	"Woman"	Won	
BMI Pop Songwriting Awards	2023	Most Performed Songs of the Year	"You Right" (with the Weeknd)	Won	
BMI Pop Songwriting Awards	2024	Most Performed Songs of the Year	"Paint The Town Red"	Won	
BMI Pop Songwriting Awards	2025	Most Performed Songs of the Year	"Agora Hills"	Won	
BMI R&B/Hip-Hop Publishing Awards (Note: As her own publishing label "Doja Cat Music".)	2021	Song of the Year	"Say So"	Won	
BMI R&B/Hip-Hop Publishing Awards	2021	Most Performed R&B/Hip-Hop Songs	"Say So"	Won	
BMI R&B/Hip-Hop Publishing Awards	2021	Most Performed R&B/Hip-Hop Songs	"Like That" (featuring Gucci Mane)	Won	
BMI R&B/Hip-Hop Publishing Awards	2022	Most Performed R&B/Hip-Hop Songs	"Best Friend" (Saweetie featuring Doja Cat)	Won	
BMI R&B/Hip-Hop Publishing Awards	2022	Most Performed R&B/Hip-Hop Songs	"You Right" (with the Weeknd)	Won	
BMI R&B/Hip-Hop Publishing Awards	2023	Most Performed R&B/Hip-Hop Songs	"Get Into It (Yuh)"	Won	
BMI R&B/Hip-Hop Publishing Awards	2023	Most Performed R&B/Hip-Hop Songs	"Vegas"	Won	
BMI R&B/Hip-Hop Publishing Awards	2023	Most Performed R&B/Hip-Hop Songs	"Woman"	Won	
BMI R&B/Hip-Hop Publishing Awards	2024	Most Performed R&B/Hip-Hop Songs	"Paint the Town Red"	Won	
BMI R&B/Hip-Hop Songwriting Awards	2021	Song of the Year	"Say So"	Won	
BMI R&B/Hip-Hop Songwriting Awards	2021	Most Performed R&B/Hip-Hop Songs	"Say So"	Won	
BMI R&B/Hip-Hop Songwriting Awards	2021	Most Performed R&B/Hip-Hop Songs	"Like That" (featuring Gucci Mane)	Won	
BMI R&B/Hip-Hop Songwriting Awards	2022	Most Performed R&B/Hip-Hop Songs	"Best Friend" (Saweetie featuring Doja Cat)	Won	
BMI R&B/Hip-Hop Songwriting Awards	2022	Most Performed R&B/Hip-Hop Songs	"You Right" (with the Weeknd)	Won	
BMI R&B/Hip-Hop Songwriting Awards	2023	Songwriter of the Year	Herself	Won	
BMI R&B/Hip-Hop Songwriting Awards	2023	Most Performed R&B/Hip-Hop Songs	"Get Into It (Yuh)"	Won	
BMI R&B/Hip-Hop Songwriting Awards	2023	Most Performed R&B/Hip-Hop Songs	"Vegas"	Won	
BMI R&B/Hip-Hop Songwriting Awards	2023	Most Performed R&B/Hip-Hop Songs	"Woman"	Won	
BMI R&B/Hip-Hop Songwriting Awards	2024	Most Performed R&B/Hip-Hop Songs	"Paint The Town Red"	Won	
Bravo Otto	2021	International Singer	Herself	Nominated	
Brit Awards	2022	Best International Artist	Herself	Nominated	
Brit Awards	2022	International Song of the Year	"Kiss Me More" (featuring SZA)	Nominated	
Brit Awards	2024	International Song of the Year	"Paint the Town Red"	Nominated	
Buenos Aires Music Video Festival Awards	2021	Video of the Year	"34+35 Remix" (with Ariana Grande and Megan Thee Stallion)	Nominated	
Buenos Aires Music Video Festival Awards	2021	Best Styling	"Streets"	Won	
Buenos Aires Music Video Festival Awards	2021	Sci-Fi	"Del Mar" (with Ozuna and Sia)	Nominated	
Campaign Big Awards (United States)	2022	Social Media	"Doja Cat and the Return of Taco Bell's Mexican Pizza"	Runner-up	
Ciclope Festival Awards	2023	Silver – Music Video – Cinematography	"Attention"	Won	
Ciclope Festival Awards	2023	Music Video – Color Grading	"Paint The Town Red"	Nominated	
Ciclope Festival Awards	2024	Silver – Sound & Music – Licensed Music	"A Life in Sound" (ft. Paint The Town Red)	Won	
Ciclope Festival Awards	2024	Production – Casting	"A Life in Sound" (ft. Paint The Town Red)	Nominated	
CinEuphoria Awards	2023	Best Song (Original or Adapted) – International Competition	"Vegas"	Nominated	
Clio Awards	2022	Silver Award – Music	Elvis (Vegas)	Won	
Clio Awards	2023	Silver Award – Partnerships & Collaborations (Mediums)	"Doja Cat and the Return of the Mexican Pizza"	Won	
Clio Awards	2023	Silver Award – Social Media (Use of Talent & Influencers)	"Doja Cat and the Return of the Mexican Pizza"	Won	
Clio Awards	2025	Silver – Music – Licensed (Professional)	"A Life in Sound" (ft. Paint The Town Red)	Won	
Clio Awards	2025	Bronze Award – Direction (Professional)	"A Life in Sound" (ft. Paint The Town Red)	Won	
Clio Music Awards	2022	Grand Gold Award – Partnerships & Collaborations (Music Marketing)	DojaCode	Won	
Clio Music Awards	2022	Gold Award – Innovation (Music Marketing)	DojaCode	Won	
Clio Music Awards	2022	Gold Award – Integrated Campaign (Music Marketing)	DojaCode	Won	
Clio Music Awards	2022	Silver Award – Album Launch/ Artist Promotion Integrated Campaign (Music Marketing)	Planet Her	Won	
Clio Music Awards	2022	Bronze Award – Film/Video (Music Marketing – Music Video)	"Kiss Me More" (featuring SZA)	Won	
Clio Music Awards	2022	Shortlist Award – Use of Music in Film/Video (30 Seconds)	Doja Cat x Coors Selzter: America Has a New Thirst Trap	Won	
Clio Music Awards	2024	Bronze Award – Digital, Mobile & Social Media Craft (Music)	Doja Cat x AEW: Original Video	Won	
Clio Music Awards	2024	Bronze – Film & Video (Music Videos)	"Demons"	Won	
Clio Music Awards	2024	Bronze Award – Public Relations (Music Marketing)	"JBL Dares to Doja"	Won	
Clio Music Awards	2024	Silver Award – Public Relations (Music Marketing)	"Doja Introduces Jibble"	Won	
Clio Music Awards	2024	Gold Award – Integrated Campaign (Music Marketing)	Doja Cat x Taco Bell: A "Contractual" Partnership	Won	
Clio Music Awards	2024	Grand Gold Award – Creative Effectiveness (Music Marketing)	Doja Cat x Taco Bell: A "Contractual" Partnership	Won	
Clio Music Awards	2024	Bronze Award – Album Launch/Artist Promotion Integrated Campaign (Music Marketing)	Elvis: The Soundtrack (Vegas)	Won	
Clio Music Awards	2024	Silver Award – Social Media (Music Marketing)	Doja Cat x Taco Bell: Mexican Pizza	Won	
Clio Music Awards	2024	Shortlist Award – Digital/Mobile (Music Marketing)	Doja Cat: Official Website	Won	
Creative Circle Awards	2024	Silver Award – Best Use of Existing Music	"A Life in Sound" (ft. Paint The Town Red)	Won	
CSS Design Awards	2021	Website of the Day	DojaCode	Won	
CSS Design Awards	2021	Innovation	DojaCode	Won	
CSS Design Awards	2021	UI Design	DojaCode	Won	
CSS Design Awards	2021	UX Design	DojaCode	Won	
Daily Front Row Fashion Media Awards	2022	Breakthrough Fashion Icon	Herself	Won	
DeGira Awards	2020	Best New Artist (In English)	Herself	Won	
DeGira Awards	2020	The Best of TikTok	"Say So"	Won	
DeGira Awards	2022	Best Music Video (In English)	"Woman"	Won	
DigiDay Awards	2022	Best Use of Influencer Marketing	Herself x JBL	Nominated	
DigiDay Awards	2025	Best Brand Partnership – B2C category	Brisk x Genius Featuring Doja Cat: Cold Takes	Won	
Discussing Film Critics Awards	2020	Best Original Song	"Boss Bitch"	Runner-up	
Discussing Film Critics Awards	2022	Best Original Song	"Vegas"	Runner-up	
Ebony Black Month	2024	Freedom in the Present	Herself	Won	
Effie Awards (United States)	2023	Bronze Award – Marketing Disruptors – Products	Doja Cat x Taco Bell: The Anti-Hero	Won	
Fast Company's World Changing Ideas Awards	2023	Advertising	DojaCode	Honoree	
FilmLight Colour Awards	2023	Music Video	"Attention"	Nominated	
FWA Awards	2021	FWA of the Day Award	Doja Cat InterstellHER Air	Won	
FWA Awards	2021	FWA of the Day Award	DojaCode	Won	
GAFFA Awards (Denmark)	2021	Best International New Act	Herself	Won	
GAFFA Awards (Denmark)	2021	International Solo Artist of the Year	Herself	Nominated	
GAFFA Awards (Denmark)	2021	International Album of the Year	Hot Pink	Nominated	
GAFFA Awards (Denmark)	2021	International Song of the Year	"Say So"	Nominated	
Gail Awards	2023	Silver Award – Social	Doja Cat x Taco Bell: A "Contractual" Partnership	Won	
Gail Awards	2023	Silver Award – Engagement	Doja Cat x Taco Bell: A "Contractual" Partnership	Won	
Gerety Awards	2024	Bronze Award – Music (Craft Cut)	"A Life In Sound" (ft. Paint The Town Red)	Won	
Grammy Awards	2021	Record of the Year	"Say So"	Nominated	
Grammy Awards	2021	Best Pop Solo Performance	"Say So"	Nominated	
Grammy Awards	2021	Best New Artist	Herself	Nominated	
Grammy Awards	2022	Record of the Year	"Kiss Me More" (featuring SZA)	Nominated	
Grammy Awards	2022	Song of the Year	"Kiss Me More" (featuring SZA)	Nominated	
Grammy Awards	2022	Best Pop Duo/Group Performance	"Kiss Me More" (featuring SZA)	Won	
Grammy Awards	2022	Album of the Year	Montero (as a featured artist)	Nominated	
Grammy Awards	2022	Album of the Year	Planet Her (deluxe)	Nominated	
Grammy Awards	2022	Best Pop Vocal Album	Planet Her (deluxe)	Nominated	
Grammy Awards	2022	Best Rap Song	"Best Friend" (Saweetie featuring Doja Cat)	Nominated	
Grammy Awards	2022	Best Melodic Rap Performance	"Need to Know"	Nominated	
Grammy Awards	2023	Record of the Year	"Woman"	Nominated	
Grammy Awards	2023	Best Pop Solo Performance	"Woman"	Nominated	
Grammy Awards	2023	Best Music Video	"Woman"	Nominated	
Grammy Awards	2023	Best Pop Duo/Group Performance	"I Like You (A Happier Song)" (Post Malone featuring Doja Cat)	Nominated	
Grammy Awards	2023	Best Rap Performance	"Vegas"	Nominated	
Grammy Awards	2024	Best Pop Solo Performance	"Paint the Town Red"	Nominated	
Grammy Awards	2024	Best Rap Song	"Attention"	Nominated	
Grammy Awards	2024	Best Melodic Rap Performance	"Attention"	Nominated	
Guild of Music Supervisors Awards	2023	Best Song Written and/or Recording Created for a Film	"Vegas"	Nominated	
HCA Creative Arts Awards	2023	Best Original Song	"Vegas"	Nominated	
Hit FM Music Awards	2021	New Artist of the Year	Herself	Won	
Hit FM Music Awards	2021	Top 10 Singles	Say So	Won	
Hit FM Music Awards	2022	Collaboration of the Year	"Kiss Me More" (featuring SZA)	Nominated	
Hit FM Music Awards	2022	Top 10 Singles	"Kiss Me More" (featuring SZA)	Nominated	
Hit FM Music Awards	2022	Live Act of the Year	Herself	Nominated	
Hit FM Music Awards	2023	Top 10 Singles	"I Like You (A Happier Song)" (with Post Malone)	Won	
Hit FM Music Awards	2023	Top 10 Singles	Woman	Nominated	
Hit FM Music Awards	2023	Dolby Atmos Music Experience	Woman	Nominated	
Hit FM Music Awards	2024	Female Artist of the Year	Herself	Nominated	
Hit FM Music Awards	2024	Top 10 Singles	"Paint The Town Red"	Won	
Hit FM Music Awards	2024	Entertainment of the Year	Herself	Won	
Hito Music Awards	2024	Song of the Year (Western)	"Paint The Town Red"	Won	
Hungarian Music Awards	2024	International Rap or Hip-Hop Album or Recording of the Year	Scarlet	Nominated	
iHeartRadio Music Awards	2021	Best New Pop Artist	Herself	Won	
iHeartRadio Music Awards	2021	Favorite Music Video Choreography	"Say So"	Nominated	
iHeartRadio Music Awards	2021	TikTok Bop of the Year	"Say So"	Nominated	
iHeartRadio Music Awards	2022	Female Artist of the Year	Herself	Nominated	
iHeartRadio Music Awards	2022	Best Collaboration	"Best Friend" (Saweetie featuring Doja Cat)	Nominated	
iHeartRadio Music Awards	2022	Best Collaboration	"Kiss Me More" (featuring SZA)	Nominated	
iHeartRadio Music Awards	2022	Song of the Year	"Kiss Me More" (featuring SZA)	Nominated	
iHeartRadio Music Awards	2022	Best Music Video	"Kiss Me More" (featuring SZA)	Nominated	
iHeartRadio Music Awards	2022	TikTok Bop of the Year	"Kiss Me More" (featuring SZA)	Nominated	
iHeartRadio Music Awards	2022	TikTok Bop of the Year	"Woman"	Nominated	
iHeartRadio Music Awards	2023	Artist of the Year	Herself	Nominated	
iHeartRadio Music Awards	2023	Most Played Titanium Award	Herself	Won	
iHeartRadio Music Awards	2023	Song of the Year	"Woman"	Nominated	
iHeartRadio Music Awards	2023	Favorite Use of a Sample	"Vegas"	Nominated	
iHeartRadio Music Awards	2023	Best Collaboration	"I Like You (A Happier Song)" (Post Malone featuring Doja Cat)	Nominated	
iHeartRadio Music Awards	2023	Best Collaboration	"You Right" (with the Weeknd)	Nominated	
iHeartRadio Music Awards	2024	Pop Artist of the Year	Herself	Nominated	
iHeartRadio Music Awards	2024	Favorite Tour Style	Herself	Nominated	
iHeartRadio Music Awards	2024	Song of the Year	"Paint the Town Red"	Nominated	
iHeartRadio Music Awards	2024	Best Lyrics	"Paint the Town Red"	Nominated	
iHeartRadio Music Awards	2024	Best Music Video	"Paint the Town Red"	Nominated	
iHeartRadio Music Awards	2024	TikTok Bop of the Year	"Paint the Town Red"	Nominated	
iHeartRadio Music Awards	2025	Artist of the Year	Herself	Nominated	
iHeartRadio Music Awards	2025	Song of the Year	"Agora Hills"	Nominated	
iHeartRadio Music Awards	2025	Pop Song of the Year	"Agora Hills"	Nominated	
iHeartRadio Music Awards	2026	Best Music Video	"Born Again" (Lisa featuring Doja Cat and Raye)	Nominated	
iHeartRadio Music Awards	2026	Favorite K-pop Collab	"Born Again" (Lisa featuring Doja Cat and Raye)	Nominated	
iHeartRadio Titanium Music Awards	2020	One billion total spins on iHeartRadio stations	"Say So"	Won	
iHeartRadio Titanium Music Awards	2021	One billion total spins on iHeartRadio stations	"Kiss Me More" (featuring SZA)	Won	
iHeartRadio Titanium Music Awards	2022	One billion total spins on iHeartRadio stations	"Need to Know"	Won	
iHeartRadio Titanium Music Awards	2023	One billion total spins on iHeartRadio stations	"Woman"	Won	
iHeartRadio Titanium Music Awards	2025	One billion total spins on iHeartRadio stations	"Agora Hills"	Won	
iHeartRadio Titanium Music Awards	2025	One billion total spins on iHeartRadio stations	"Paint The Town Red"	Won	
Iberian Festival Awards	2025	Best Live Performance (Int.)	Herself at Rock in Rio Lisboa	Won	
Intensive Watch Awards (Note: The Intensive Watch Awards are an awards created by the Intensive Watch Company, a company that monitors radio spins, ads and illegal ads in Thailand. Each month, one song is awarded for being the most popular on TV & Radio in Thailand. The annual awards are based on performance of the songs on Radio & TV)	2021	Song of the Month – August (International)	"Like That"(featuring Gucci Mane)	Won	
Intensive Watch Awards	2021	Song of the Year (International)	"Like That"(featuring Gucci Mane)	Runner-up	
Intensive Watch Awards	2022	Song of the Year (International)	"I Like You (A Happier Song)" (with Post Malone)	Won	
Intensive Watch Awards	2022	Song of the Month – June (International)	"Freaky Deaky"	Won	
Intensive Watch Awards	2022	Song of the Month – August (International)	"I Like You (A Happier Song)" (with Post Malone)	Won	
Intensive Watch Awards	2023	Song of the Month – October (International)	"Paint The Town Red"	Won	
Intensive Watch Awards	2023	Song of the Month – November (International)	"Paint The Town Red"	Won	
Intensive Watch Awards	2023	Song of the Year (International)	"Paint The Town Red"	Runner-up	
Joox Thailand Music Awards	2022	International Song of the Year	"Kiss Me More"	Nominated	
Joox Thailand Music Awards	2022	Top Social Global Artist of the Year	Herself	Nominated	
Juno Awards	2022	International Album of the Year	Planet Her	Nominated	
Las Vegas Film Critics Society Awards	2022	Best Original Song	"Vegas"	Won	
Latin American Music Awards	2021	Favorite Video	"Del Mar" (with Ozuna and Sia)	Nominated	
London International Awards	2023	Use of Social Media & Influencers	Doja Cat x Taco Bell: Mexican Pizza	Nominated	
London International Awards	2023	Use of TikTok	Doja Cat x Taco Bell: Mexican Pizza	Nominated	
London International Awards	2024	Bronze Award – Production & Post-Production	'A Life in Sound' (ft. Paint The Town Red)	Won	
London International Awards	2024	Bronze Award – Use of Music, Direction	'A Life in Sound' (ft. Paint The Town Red)	Won	
Lo Nuestro Awards	2022	Crossover Collaboration of the Year	"Del Mar"	Nominated	
LOS40 Music Awards	2020	Best International New Act	Herself	Nominated	
LOS40 Music Awards	2021	Best International Act	Herself	Nominated	
Marketing Week Awards	2023	Best Use of Influencer	Doja Cat x JBL: "JBL Dares to Doja"	Won	
MTV Millennial Awards	2021	Global Hit of the Year	"Kiss Me More" (featuring SZA)	Nominated	
MTV Millennial Awards Brazil	2020	Global Hit	"Say So" (featuring Nicki Minaj)	Nominated	
MTV Millennial Awards Brazil	2020	International Collaboration	"Say So" (featuring Nicki Minaj)	Nominated	
MTV Millennial Awards Brazil	2021	International Collaboration	"Kiss Me More" (featuring SZA)	Nominated	
MTV Movie & TV Awards	2023	Best Song	"Vegas"	Nominated	
MTV Europe Music Awards	2020	Best Push Act	Herself	Nominated	
MTV Europe Music Awards	2020	Best New Act	Herself	Won	
MTV Europe Music Awards	2021	Best Artist	Herself	Nominated	
MTV Europe Music Awards	2021	Best US Act	Herself	Nominated	
MTV Europe Music Awards	2021	Best Pop	Herself	Nominated	
MTV Europe Music Awards	2021	Best Song	"Kiss Me More" (featuring SZA)	Nominated	
MTV Europe Music Awards	2021	Best Video	"Kiss Me More" (featuring SZA)	Nominated	
MTV Europe Music Awards	2021	Best Collaboration	"Kiss Me More" (featuring SZA)	Won	
MTV Europe Music Awards	2022	Best Collaboration	"I Like You (A Happier Song)" (Post Malone featuring Doja Cat)	Nominated	
MTV Europe Music Awards	2022	Best Video	"Woman"	Nominated	
MTV Europe Music Awards	2022	Best Pop	Herself	Nominated	
MTV Europe Music Awards	2022	Best US Act	Herself	Nominated	
MTV Europe Music Awards	2023	Best Song	"Paint the Town Red"	Nominated	
MTV Europe Music Awards	2023	Best Video	"Paint the Town Red"	Nominated	
MTV Europe Music Awards	2023	Best Artist	Herself	Nominated	
MTV Europe Music Awards	2023	Best US Act	Herself	Nominated	
MTV Europe Music Awards	2024	Best Live	Herself	Nominated	
MTV Video Music Awards	2020	Push Best New Artist	Herself	Won	
MTV Video Music Awards	2020	Song of the Year	"Say So"	Nominated	
MTV Video Music Awards	2020	Best Direction	"Say So"	Nominated	
MTV Video Music Awards	2020	Song of Summer	"Say So"	Nominated	
MTV Video Music Awards	2021	Video of the Year	"Kiss Me More" (featuring SZA)	Nominated	
MTV Video Music Awards	2021	Best Collaboration	"Kiss Me More" (featuring SZA)	Won	
MTV Video Music Awards	2021	Best Art Direction	"Best Friend" (Saweetie featuring Doja Cat)	Won	
MTV Video Music Awards	2021	Best Visual Effects	"You Right" (with the Weeknd)	Nominated	
MTV Video Music Awards	2021	Artist of the Year	Herself	Nominated	
MTV Video Music Awards	2021	Song of Summer	"Need to Know"	Nominated	
MTV Video Music Awards	2022	Video of the Year	"Woman"	Nominated	
MTV Video Music Awards	2022	Song of the Year	"Woman"	Nominated	
MTV Video Music Awards	2022	Best Pop	"Woman"	Nominated	
MTV Video Music Awards	2022	Best Choreography	"Woman"	Won	
MTV Video Music Awards	2022	Best Art Direction	"Get Into It (Yuh)"	Nominated	
MTV Video Music Awards	2022	Best Editing	"Get Into It (Yuh)"	Nominated	
MTV Video Music Awards	2022	Song of Summer	"Vegas"	Nominated	
MTV Video Music Awards	2022	Song of Summer	"I Like You (A Happier Song)" (Post Malone featuring Doja Cat)	Nominated	
MTV Video Music Awards	2023	Video of the Year	"Attention"	Nominated	
MTV Video Music Awards	2023	Best Direction	"Attention"	Nominated	
MTV Video Music Awards	2023	Best Art Direction	"Attention"	Won	
MTV Video Music Awards	2023	Best Collaboration	"I Like You (A Happier Song)" (Post Malone featuring Doja Cat)	Nominated	
MTV Video Music Awards	2023	Artist of the Year	Herself	Nominated	
MTV Video Music Awards	2023	Song of the Summer	"Paint the Town Red"	Nominated	
MTV Video Music Awards	2024	Video of the Year	"Paint the Town Red"	Nominated	
MTV Video Music Awards	2025	Best K-Pop	"Born Again" (Lisa featuring Doja Cat and Raye)	Won	
MTV Video Music Awards	2025	Song of Summer	"Jealous Type"	Nominated	
MTV Video Music Awards	2026	Song of Summer	"Okayyy" (Latto featuring Doja Cat)		
MTV Video Music Awards Japan	2020	Best New International Artist Video	"Say So"	Won	
MTV Video Play Awards	2020	Top 10 Music Videos	"Say So"	Won	
MTV Video Play Awards	2021	Top 20 Music Videos	"Kiss Me More" (featuring SZA)	Won	
Muse Awards	2024	Gold Award – Event – Concert	The Scarlet Tour (Set & Stage Pieces)	Won	
MusicDaily Awards	2020	Best New Artist	Herself	Won	
MusicDaily Awards	2020	Best Viral TikTok Song	"Say So"	Won	
MusicDaily Awards	2020	Collaboration of the Year	"Say So Remix"	Won	
MusicDaily Awards	2021	Collaboration of the Year	"34+35 (Remix)" (with Ariana Grande and Megan Thee Stallion)	Won	
Music+Sound Awards	2024	Best Sync in Online, Social + Digital Advertising	"A Life in Sound" (ft. Paint The Town Red)	Won	
MVPA Awards	2021	Best Pop Video	"Say So"	Nominated	
MVPA Awards	2021	Best Cinematography in a Video	"Say So"	Nominated	
MVPA Awards	2021	Best Colour Grading in a Video	"Say So"	Won	
MVPA Awards	2021	Best Lockdown Video	"To Be Young" (Anne-Marie featuring Doja Cat)	Nominated	
NAACP Image Awards	2021	Outstanding New Artist	Herself	Won	
NAACP Image Awards	2022	Outstanding New Artist	Saweetie, Best Friend (featuring Doja Cat)	Won	
NAACP Image Awards	2022	Outstanding Music Video/Visual Album	"Best Friend"	Nominated	
NAACP Image Awards	2022	Outstanding Hip Hop/Rap Song	"Best Friend"	Nominated	
NAACP Image Awards	2022	Outstanding Duo, Group or Collaboration (Traditional)	"Kiss Me More" (featuring SZA)	Nominated	
New Music Awards	2022	Top40/CHR Female Artist of the Year	Herself	Nominated	
New Music Awards	2022	Top40/CHR Group of the Year	Herself & SZA	Nominated	
New Music Awards	2022	AC Group of the Year	Herself & the Weeknd	Nominated	
New Music Awards	2023	Top40/CHR Female Artist of the Year	Herself	Nominated	
New Music Awards	2023	Top40/CHR Group of the Year	Herself & Post Malone	Won	
New Music Weekly	2025	Top40 Radio Format	"Born Again" (Lisa featuring Doja Cat and Raye)	Won	
Nickelodeon Kids' Choice Awards	2022	Favorite Music Collaboration	"Best Friend" (Saweetie featuring Doja Cat)	Nominated	
NRJ Music Awards	2020	Video of the Year	"Say So"	Nominated	
NRJ Music Awards	2020	Best New International Artist	Herself	Won	
NRJ Music Awards	2021	International Female Artist of the Year	Herself	Nominated	
People's Choice Awards	2020	Best New Artist of 2020	Herself	Won	
People's Choice Awards	2020	Soundtrack Song of 2020	"Boss Bitch"	Nominated	
People's Choice Awards	2021	The Female Artist of 2021	Herself	Nominated	
People's Choice Awards	2021	The Album of 2021	Planet Her	Nominated	
People's Choice Awards	2021	The Collaboration Song of 2021	"Best Friend" (Saweetie featuring Doja Cat)	Nominated	
People's Choice Awards	2021	The Collaboration Song of 2021	"Kiss Me More" (featuring SZA)	Nominated	
People's Choice Awards	2021	The Collaboration Song of 2021	"You Right" (with the Weeknd)	Nominated	
People's Choice Awards	2022	The Female Artist of 2022	Herself	Nominated	
People's Choice Awards	2022	The Collaboration Song of 2022	"Freaky Deaky" (with Tyga)	Nominated	
Planeta Awards	2021	Album of the Year	Hot Pink	Nominated	
Planeta Awards	2021	Best New Artist/Group	Herself	Won	
Planeta Awards	2021	Best Hip-Hop/R&B Song	"Say So"	Nominated	
Planeta Awards	2023	Best Hip-Hop/R&B Song	"I Like You (A Happier Song)" (with Post Malone)	Won	
PR News Digital Awards	2024	Brand Partnership	"JBL Dares to Doja"	Runner-up	
PR News Platinum Awards	2023	Integrated Communications, Marketing & PR	"JBL Dares to Doja"	Runner-up	
PR News Platinum Awards	2023	PR Stunt	"Doja Introduces Jibble"	Runner-up	
RTHK International Pop Poll Awards	2021	International Gold Song	"Say So"	Won	
Sabre Awards	2023	Technology	Doja Cat x JBL	Won	
Sabre Awards	2023	Experiential	Doja Cat x JBL	Nominated	
Satellite Awards	2023	Best Original Song	"Vegas"	Nominated	
Shark Awards	2024	Silver Award – Best Use of Licensed Music	"A Life in Sound" (ft. Paint The Town Red)	Won	
Shark Awards	2024	Best Colour Grading	"Paint The Town Red"	Nominated	
Shorty Awards	2022	Silver Award – Earned Media	"Doja Introduces Jibble, Jibble, Jibble"	Won	
Shorty Awards	2022	Multi-Platform Partnership	"Dare to Doja"	Nominated	
Shorty Awards	2022	Technology	"Dare to Doja"	Nominated	
Shorty Awards	2025	Brand Partnership	Brisk x Genius featuring Doja Cat: "Cold Takes"	Nominated	
Shots Awards	2023	Production and Styling	"The Grande Escape" (with Taco Bell)	Finalist	
Signal Awards	2023	Music – Individual Episode	"Origins: Doja Cat from Audible"	Won	
SOCAN Music Awards	2022	R&B Music	"You Right" (with The Weeknd)	Won	
Social Media Marketing Awards	2023	Best Mega Influencer Campaign	"JBL Dares to Doja"	Won	
Soul Train Music Awards	2021	Album of the Year	Planet Her	Nominated	
Soul Train Music Awards	2021	Best R&B/Soul Female Artist	Herself	Nominated	
Soul Train Music Awards	2021	Best Collaboration	"Kiss Me More" (featuring SZA)	Nominated	
Soul Train Music Awards	2022	Best Dance Performance	"Woman"	Nominated	
Stevie Awards	2022	Gold Award – Campaign of the Year – Social Media Focused	"Doja Cat Introduces Jibble"	Won	
Stevie Awards	2022	Gold Award – Campaign of the Year – Influencer Marketing	"Doja Cat Introduces Jibble"	Won	
TEC Awards	2021	Outstanding Creative Achievement – Record Production/Album	Hot Pink	Nominated	
Telly Awards	2023	Silver Award – General – Music	Doja Cat x JBL: "Dare To Relive"	Won	
TGJ Awards	2020	Single of the Year	"Say So"	Won	
TGJ Awards	2020	Best Collaboration	"Say So Remix" (featuring Nicki Minaj)	Won	
TGJ Awards	2020	Best Female Artist	Herself	Won	
TGJ Awards	2021	Album of the Year	Planet Her	Nominated	
TGJ Awards	2021	Single of the Year	"Kiss Me More"	Nominated	
TGJ Awards	2021	Best Collaboration	"Kiss Me More"	Nominated	
TGJ Awards	2021	Best Female Artist	Herself	Nominated	
TGJ Awards	2021	Best Music Video	"Streets"	Nominated	
TGJ Awards	2022	Best Female Artist	Herself	Nominated	
TGJ Awards	2022	Music Video of the Year	"Get Into It (Yuh)"	Nominated	
TGJ Awards	2023	Album of the Year	Scarlet	Nominated	
TGJ Awards	2023	Single of the Year	"Paint The Town Red"	Nominated	
TGJ Awards	2023	Best Female Artist	Herself	Nominated	
TGJ Awards	2023	Music Video of the Year	"Demons"	Nominated	
The Austin American-Statesman's Dojie Awards	2021	Best Choreography	Herself at ACL Music Festival	Won	
The Austin American-Statesman's Dojie Awards	2021	Best Emotional Range	Herself at ACL Music Festival	Won	
The Austin American-Statesman's Dojie Awards	2021	Best Fantasy World Building	Herself at ACL Music Festival	Won	
The Austin American-Statesman's Dojie Awards	2021	Best Girlfriendly Advice	Herself at ACL Music Festival	Won	
The Austin American-Statesman's Dojie Awards	2021	Best Unexpected Opportunity To Mosh	Herself at ACL Music Festival	Won	
The Awwwards	2021	Site of the Day	Doja Cat InterstellHER Air	Runner-up	
The Awwwards	2021	Site of the Day	DojaCode	Runner-up	
The Awwwards	2021	Site of the Day	Doja Cat Website	Runner-up	
The Bulletin Awards (Note: The Bulletin Awards is an online awards group)	2020	Artist of the Year	Herself	Nominated	
The Bulletin Awards	2020	Album of the Year	Hot Pink	Nominated	
The Bulletin Awards	2020	Single of the Year	"Say So (Remix)"	Nominated	
The Bulletin Awards	2020	Music Video of the Year	"Say So"	Nominated	
The Bulletin Awards	2020	Female Artist of the Year	Herself	Nominated	
The Bulletin Awards	2020	Song of the Summer	"Like That"	Nominated	
The Bulletin Awards	2021	Artist of the Year	Herself	Won	
The Bulletin Awards	2021	Single of the Year	"Kiss Me More"	Nominated	
The Bulletin Awards	2021	Collaboration of the Year	"Kiss Me More"	Nominated	
The Bulletin Awards	2021	Song of the Summer	"Kiss Me More"	Won	
The Bulletin Awards	2021	Music Video of the Year	"Kiss Me More"	Nominated	
The Bulletin Awards	2021	Music Video of the Year	"Streets"	Nominated	
The Bulletin Awards	2021	Performance of the Year	Herself – 2020 Billboard Music Awards	Won	
The Bulletin Awards	2022	Artist of the Year	Herself	Won	
The Bulletin Awards	2022	Album of the Year	Planet Her	Won	
The Bulletin Awards	2022	Music Video of the Year	"Woman"	Nominated	
The Bulletin Awards	2022	Best Choreography	"Woman"	Won	
The Bulletin Awards	2022	Performance of the Year	Herself – Coachella 2022	Won	
The Bulletin Awards	2022	Female Artist of the Year	Herself	Won	
The Daily Californian's Arts Awards	2020	Best Billboard Hot 100 Songle	"Say So"	Runner-up	
The Daily Californian's Arts Awards	2021	Song of the Year	"Kiss Me More"	Won	
The Daily Californian's Arts Awards	2021	Best Collaboration	"Kiss Me More"	Won	
The Daily Californian's Arts Awards	2021	Best Hip-Hop/Rap Album	"Planet Her"	Won	
The Daily Californian's Arts Awards	2022	Best Music Video	"Woman"	Runner-up	
The Daily Californian's Arts Awards	2023	Best Billboard Hot 100 Single	"Paint The Town Red"	Won	
The Drum Social Media Awards	2022	Best Celebrity and Influencer Brand Partnership	Doja Cat x JBL	Won	
The D Show Awards	2023	Black Award – Live Music	Doja Cat x JBL: Dare to Get Into It	Won	
The Indies Awards	2021	Best Pop Album	"Planet Her"	Runner-up	
The One Show Awards	2022	Grand Prize Best of Discipline Award – Best of Interactive & Mobile Craft	DojaCode	Grand Prize	
The One Show Awards	2022	Best of Discipline Award – Best of Branded Entertainment	DojaCode	Grand Prize	
The One Show Awards	2022	Gold Pencil Award – Music Videos	DojaCode	Won	
The One Show Awards	2022	Gold Pencil Award – Online & Mobile Video: Interactive Video	DojaCode	Won	
The One Show Awards	2022	Gold Pencil Award – Innovation & Transformation: Innovation in Interactive & Mobile Craft	DojaCode	Won	
The One Show Awards	2022	Gold Pencil Award – Experiential & Inmersive: Use of Technology	DojaCode	Won	
The One Show Awards	2022	Gold Pencil Award – Innovation & Transformation: Innovation in Branded Entertainment	DojaCode	Won	
The One Show Awards	2022	Gold Pencil Award – Branded Entertainment: Use of Technology	DojaCode	Won	
The One Show Awards	2022	Silver Pencil Award – UX / UI / User Experience / CD / DX	DojaCode	Won	
The One Show Awards	2022	Bronze Pencil Award – Creative Effectiveness: non-profit: Charity	DojaCode	Won	
The One Show Awards	2022	Bronze Pencil Award – Innovation & Transformation: Innovation In Experiential	DojaCode	Won	
The One Show Awards	2022	Bronze Pencil Award – Digital Product: / Promotional	DojaCode	Won	
The One Show Awards	2022	Bronze Pencil Award – Innovation & Transformation: Innovation in Interactive, Online & Mobile	DojaCode	Won	
The One Show Awards	2022	Merit Award – Artist: Brand Collaboration	DojaCode	Merit	
The One Show Awards	2022	Merit Award – Cultural Driver	DojaCode	Merit	
The One Show Awards	2022	Merit Award – Websites: Desktop & Responsive	DojaCode	Merit	
The One Show Awards	2022	Merit Award – Visual Craft: Visual Effects	DojaCode	Merit	
The One Show Awards	2022	Merit Award – Creative Effectiveness: non-profit: Charity	DojaCode	Merit	
The One Show Awards	2022	Merit Award – Artist: Brand Collaboration	Doja Cat x Taco Bell: A "Contractual" Partnership	Merit	
ThinkLA Idea Awards	2023	Best Social Media Campaign	Doja Cat x Taco Bell: A "Contractual" Partnership	Won	
Ticketmaster Awards (United Kingdom)	2025	Act of the Year	Herself	Nominated	
Triple J Hottest 100	2023	Song of the Year	"Paint The Town Red"	Won	
UK Music Video Awards	2021	Best R&B/Soul Video – International	"Streets"	Nominated	
UK Music Video Awards	2023	Best Hip Hop/Grime/Rap Video – International	"Attention"	Nominated	
UK Music Video Awards	2023	Best Editing in a Video	"Attention"	Nominated	
UK Music Video Awards	2024	Best Hip Hop/Grime/Rap Video – International	"Demons"	Nominated	
Urban Music Awards	2021	Artist of the Year (USA)	Herself	Nominated	
Urban Music Awards	2021	Best Collaboration	"Kiss Me More" (featuring SZA)	Nominated	
Vevo First LIFT	2020	Artist of the Year	Herself	Won	
Webby Awards	2023	Advertising, Media & PR Best Partnership or Collaboration	Doja Cat x Taco Bell: A Contractual Partnership	Nominated	
Webby Awards	2023	Best Influencer or Creator Endorsement, Features (Social)	Doja Cat x Taco Bell: A Contractual Partnership	Won	
Webby Awards	2023	People's Voice: Social, Best Creator or Influencer Collaboration	Doja Cat x Taco Bell: A Contractual Partnership	Won	
Webby Awards	2023	People's Voice: Websites and Mobile Sites: Best Visual Design – Aesthetic	Doja Cat Website	Won	
Webby Awards	2024	Best Music Video	"Paint The Town Red"	Nominated	
Webby Awards	2025	AI, Immersive & Games: Best Music/Sound Design	Doja Cat – Hot Pink vs. Scarlet (Fortnite)	Honoree	
XXL Awards	2022	Artist of the Year	Herself	Nominated	
XXL Awards	2022	Female Rapper of the Year	Herself	Won	
XXL Awards	2022	Performer of the Year	Herself	Won	
XXL Awards	2022	The People's Champ	Herself	Nominated	
XXL Awards	2022	Album of the Year	Planet Her	Nominated	
YouTube Creator Awards	2020–2022	Silver Play Button	Herself	Won	
YouTube Creator Awards	2020–2022	Gold Play Button	Herself	Won	
YouTube Creator Awards	2020–2022	Diamond Play Button	Herself	Won	

== Other accolades ==
=== Guinness World Records ===
As of April 2025, Doja Cat has acquired 1 Guinness World Records.

Key
†	Indicates a former world-record holder

Name of publication, year the record was awarded, name of the record, and the name of the record holder
Publication	Year	World record	Record holder	R. Status	Ref.
Guinness World Records	2020	First female rap duo to reach No.1 on the US Singles Chart.	Herself & Nicki Minaj	Record	

=== Listicles ===
Name of publisher, name of listicle, year(s) listed, and placement result
Publisher	Listicle	Year(s)	Result	Ref.
Apple Music	Top Global Songs of the Year	2020	36 (Say So)	
Apple Music	Top Global Songs of the Year	2021	12 (Kiss Me More) (featuring SZA)	
Apple Music	Top Global Songs of the Year	2021	36 (Streets)	
Apple Music	Top Global Songs of the Year	2021	92 (Need to Know)	
Apple Music	Top Global Songs of the Year	2021	93 (Best Friend) (with Saweetie)	
Apple Music	Top Global Songs of the Year	2022	31 (Kiss Me More) (featuring SZA)	
Apple Music	Top Global Songs of the Year	2022	35 (Need to Know)	
Apple Music	Top Global Songs of the Year	2022	49 (Woman)	
Apple Music	Top Global Songs of the Year	2023	67 (Paint the Town Red)	
Apple Music	Top Global Songs of the Year	2024	35 (Paint the Town Red)	
Apple Music	Top Global Songs of the Year	2024	30 (Agora Hills)	
Billboard	Top Artists (Female)	2022	2	
Billboard	Top Hot 100 Artists	2022	2	
Billboard	Top Hot 100 Artists (Female)	2022	1	
Billboard	Top R&B Songs	2022	2 (Woman)	
Billboard	Top Radio Artists	2022	1	
Billboard	Best Songs of 2023	2023	5 (Paint the Town Red)	
Billboard	Greatest Pop Stars of the 21st Century	2024	Placed (Note: The 26th through 50th greatest pop stars on the 21st century were listed alphabetically as honorable mentions.) (25th – 50th)	
Billboard	Top Women Artists of the 21st Century	2025	24	
Forbes	30 Under 30	2021	Placed	
IFPI	Top Global Albums	2021	10 (Planet Her)	
IFPI	Top Global Streaming Albums	2022	8 (Planet Her)	
iHeartRadio	Top Artists of 2024	2024	4	
iHeartRadio	Top Artists of 2024 (Pop)	2024	2	
iHeartRadio	Top Songs of 2024	2024	1 (Agora Hills)	
Time	Time 100: Most Influential People	2023	Placed	

=== Vevo-certified Videos ===
Year	Nominee/work	Awarded videos	Ref.
2024	Doja Cat	23	
As of May 6, 2025
