= Bottom Bitch =

2019 song by Doja Cat

Single by Doja Cat

from the album Hot Pink
- Released: October 3, 2019
- Recorded: 2019
- Genre: Alternative hip hop; pop-punk; rap rock
- Length: 3:18
- Label: Kemosabe; RCA
- Songwriters: Travis Barker; David A. Sprecher; Mark Hoppus; Tom DeLonge; Amala Zandile Dlamini
- Producers: Yeti Beats; Doja Cat

Doja Cat singles chronology
"Make That Cake" (2019)	"Bottom Bitch" (2019)	"Rules" (2019)

Music video
- "Bottom Bitch on YouTube

"Bottom Bitch" is a song by American rapper and singer Doja Cat. It was released through Kemosabe and RCA Records on October 3, 2019, as the second single from her second studio album Hot Pink (2019). The song was written and produced by Doja Cat and Yeti Beats with additional writing credits going to the members of Blink-182 for the sampling of their 1999 single "What's My Age Again?".

Musically, the song incorporates alternative hip hop and pop-punk with elements of grunge. A music video was released on the same day, directed by Jack Begert. It shows Doja skateboarding around the San Fernando Valley while vandalizing and causing trouble, ending with a performance of the song at a skate park, with a cameo appearance by American rapper Rico Nasty.

== Background and release ==
Doja Cat first alluded to the song in an interview with Total Request Live through MTV by stating that she sampled Blink-182 on one of the songs on her then-upcoming second studio album Hot Pink (2019). The song was officially announced on her Instagram on October 2, 2019, posting the single cover and the release date of 10:00 a.m. Eastern Time (UTC−05:00) on October 3, 2019.

== Composition and lyrics ==
"Bottom Bitch" has been described as an alternative hip-hop and pop-punk track. The song also has elements of grunge, and features a trap beat. A vocoder is used on Doja Cat's vocals. It samples American rock band Blink-182's 1999 single "What's My Age Again" from the album Enema of the State (1999), with the original guitar riff slowed and transposed down. The term bottom bitch usually refers to a prostitute who has status or power over other prostitutes working for a pimp. Doja Cat refers to her best friend as her bottom bitch, calling her a ride or die and not causing any problems. "Bottom Bitch" name-checks American rapper Lil Xan and American singer Noah Cyrus, referencing their past relationship. The song is inspired by the punk rock and skating scene of Southern California, which is reflected in the accompanying music video.

== Critical reception ==
"Bottom Bitch" was met with positive reviews. The Musical Hype rated the song four out of five stars and described it as "a blast to listen to", noting that "it's raunchy mind you but endearing at the same time". Maxamillion Polo from Ones to Watch praised its "late '90s and early 2000s grunge-evoking production, immediately hurdling us back to a time where all we wanted to be was a little more like Avril Lavigne or Kurt Cobain". Jarred Howard of Lyrical Lemonade said "Bottom Bitch" was "athematic" and "the kind of song I was looking for whenever I first heard Doja Cat's single 'So High' back in 2014".

== Music video ==
A music video was released the same day as the single on October 3, 2019. It was directed by Jack Begert and produced by the production company Psycho Films. It shows Doja Cat skateboarding around the San Fernando Valley, with shots of her and her friends throwing milkshakes at a police officer and eggs a vehicle of passengers. The video ends with Doja Cat performing the song at a skate park with an audience watching. American rapper Rico Nasty makes a cameo appearance during this scene.

Doja's stylist Brett Alan Nelson recalled in a Billboard interview about being inspired by female angst punk-pop music for the outfits Doja would wear in the video. In the same interview, Nelson also recalls getting logo clearance from the clothing company Dickies to have Doja wear them in the video. Dickies then redacted the logo clearance from Nelson, claiming Doja was "too sexy for their brand". Nelson the night before the video shoot colored out the "ies" of Dickies and the horseshoe to just reveal "Dick", hoping to get back at the brand.

== Credits and personnel ==
Credits adapted from the liner notes of Hot Pink.

- Doja Cat – vocals, writer, producer
- Yeti Beats – writer, producer, engineer
- Travis Barker – writer
- Mark Hoppus – writer
- Tom DeLonge – writer
- Mike Bozzi – mastering engineer
- David Nakaji – mixing engineer
- John Bruington – assistant engineer

== Charts ==
Chart performance for "Bottom Bitch"
Chart (2019)	Peak position
New Zealand Hot Singles (RMNZ)	32
US Rolling Stone Trending 25	16

== Certifications ==
Certifications for "Bottom Bitch"
Region	Certification	Certified units/sales
Brazil (Pro-Música Brasil)	Gold	20,000^{‡}
Canada (Music Canada)	Gold	40,000^{‡}
United States (RIAA)	Gold	500,000^{‡}
^{‡} Sales+streaming figures based on certification alone.
