= Make That Cake =

Song by LunchMoney Lewis

Single by LunchMoney Lewis featuring Doja Cat
- Released: June 28, 2019 (original); September 6, 2019 (remix)
- Length: 2:53
- Label: Lunchbox
- Songwriters: Gamal Lewis; Amala Dlamini
- Producers: Salaam Remi; LunchMoney Lewis; Janessa Cuba

LunchMoney Lewis singles chronology
| "Ridiculous" (2018) | "Make That Cake" (2019) | "Pony" (2019) |

Doja Cat singles chronology
| "Juicy" (2019) | "Make That Cake" (2019) | "Bottom Bitch" (2019) |

Music video
- "Make That Cake" on YouTube

"Make That Cake" is a song by American rapper LunchMoney Lewis, released on June 28, 2019 through Lunchbox Records. There are two versions of the song, one solo and another featuring fellow American rapper Doja Cat. There were accompanying music videos for both versions of the song.

== Background and promotion ==
The original version of the song was premiered on June 28, 2019, three months before the remix was released as a single. A music video for the original version was uploaded via Lewis' YouTube account on July 15, 2019. On September 6, 2019, Lewis uploaded the music video for the remix featuring Doja Cat on his YouTube account. The video for the song was released simultaneously and was directed by Chris Moreno.

== Critical reception ==
Writing for The Fader, Sajae Elder praised both Lewis and Doja Cat's rapping, describing it as "laidback flows" and also described the song as a "bouncy track". Milca P. of the website HotNewHipHop wroteː "On the cut, Lewis and Doja match off on similar flows as the track arrives attached to an equally eclectic clip directed by Chris Moreno." AllHipHop added to their blog, "LunchMoney Lewis returns with Doja Cat and all that cake".

== Track listing ==
Digital download
| No. | Title | Length |
|---|---|---|
| 1. | "Make That Cake" | 2:54 |

Digital download
| No. | Title | Length |
|---|---|---|
| 1. | "Make That Cake" (featuring Doja Cat) | 2:53 |

== Release history ==
| Region | Date | Format | Version | Label | Ref |
|---|---|---|---|---|---|
| United States | June 28, 2019 | Digital download; streaming | Original version | Lunchbox Records | |
| United States | September 6, 2019 | Digital download; streaming | With Doja Cat | Lunchbox Records | |
| United Kingdom | September 6, 2019 | Digital download; streaming | With Doja Cat | Lunchbox Records | |
| France | September 6, 2019 | Digital download; streaming | With Doja Cat | Lunchbox Records | |
