= Nunchaku (disambiguation) =

A nunchaku is an Okinawan martial arts weapon.

Nunchaku or Nunchuk may also refer to:

- Nunchaku (Isabelle), a tool of the Isabelle proof assistant
- Nunchuk (G.I. Joe), a fictional character in the G.I. Joe franchise
- Nunchuk (controller), a Wii Remote expansion

== See also ==
- "Nunchucks", a song by Jay Chou from the 2001 album Fantasy
- "Nunchucks", a song by Doja Cat from the 2014 EP Purrr!
