= Bottom bitch (disambiguation) =

A bottom bitch is a prostitute who is at the top of her pimp's hierarchy.

Bottom Bitch may refer to:

- "Bottom Bitch", a 2019 song by Doja Cat
- "Bottom Bitch", a 2021 song by Tink
- "Bottom Bitch", an episode of American crime drama The Shield
