= Billboard Music Award for Top R&B Female Artist =

Annual American music award

- Country: United States
- Presented by: Billboard
- First award: 2018
- Currently held by: SZA (2024)

Highlights
- Most wins: SZA (3)
- Most nominations: SZA (5)
- Website: billboardmusicawards.com

The following list shows the winners and nominees for the Billboard Music Award for Top R&B Female Artist. The award was first given in 2018 when gendered categories were added to the award show. SZA was the first winner, the most nominated artist in this category with four nominations, and has won this award the most with three wins.

== Winners and nominees ==
Listed below are the winners of the award for each year, as well as the other nominees.

Table key
‡	Indicates the winner

Year	Artist	Ref.
2018	Beyoncé	
2018	Rihanna	
2018	SZA ‡	
2019	Ella Mai ‡	
2019	H.E.R.	
2019	Queen Naija	
2020	Beyoncé	
2020	Lizzo	
2020	Summer Walker ‡	
2021	Doja Cat ‡	
2021	Jhené Aiko	
2021	SZA	
2022	Doja Cat ‡	
2022	Summer Walker	
2022	SZA	
2023	Beyoncé	
2023	Rihanna	
2023	SZA ‡	
2024	Muni Long	
2024	SZA ‡	
2024	Tyla	
