= Freak (Doja Cat song) =

2020 promotional single by Doja Cat

Promotional single by Doja Cat
- Published: November 11, 2018
- Released: August 7, 2020
- Recorded: 2018
- Studio: Lineage Studios (Los Angeles, California); The Sound Factory (Los Angeles, California)
- Genre: R&B
- Length: 4:44
- Label: Kemosabe; RCA
- Songwriters: Amala Zandile Dlamini; David Sprecher; Cameron Bartolini; Paul Anka; Chad Hugo; Pharrell Williams
- Producers: Doja Cat; Cambo; Yeti Beats (add.)

Audio video
- "Freak" on YouTube

"Freak" is a song by American rapper and singer Doja Cat released through Kemosabe Records and RCA Records on August 7, 2020. Originally uploaded exclusively to SoundCloud in 2018, it was repackaged and released commercially due to popular demand by fans online. The single samples the 1959 song, "Put Your Head on My Shoulder" by Paul Anka. A standalone promotional single, "Freak" received a limited vinyl release via Urban Outfitters in November 2020.

== Background and release ==
Prior to its re-release, "Freak" had gained popularity on the video-sharing platform TikTok, where it had been used in over 1.2 million videos. In late June 2020, Doja Cat teased multiple new songs on an Instagram Live which she stated would all be released together in an upcoming project. Alongside the announcement of "Freak", Doja Cat wrote that she had released the song to hold her fans off while she works on "a new surprise." Both a clean and explicit version were released digitally. In November 2020, a limited edition vinyl release of the song was made available exclusively through Urban Outfitters to support 11/11 Singles Day.

== Credits and personnel ==
Recording and management

- Engineered at Lineage Studios (Los Angeles, California)
- Vocals Recorded at The Sound Factory (Los Angeles, California)
- Mastered at Bernie Grundman Mastering (Hollywood, California)
- Doja Cat Music/Prescription Songs (BMI), Yeti Yeti Yeti/WB Music Corp. (ASCAP), Cameron Bartolini Music (ASCAP), EPA Publishing/PW Ballads/Songs of Universal, Inc. (BMI), Chrysalis Standards, Inc./BMG Rights Management (BMI), Universal Music – Careers (BMI), EMI Blackwood Music, Inc. (BMI), Waters of Nazareth Publishing/Warner Geo Met Ric Music (GMR)
- Contains a sample from "Put Your Head on My Shoulder", words and music by Paul Anka, published by EPA Publishing/PW Ballads/Songs of Universal, Inc. (BMI) and 1938 (Renewed 1986) Chrysalis Standards, Inc./BMG Rights Management (BMI)/BMG Blue (BMII) administers 100% for the World ex USA obo Paul Anka/Chrysalis Standards, Inc. (BMI), used courtesy of Paul Anka Productions, by arrangement with Primary Wave Music
- Contains a portion of the composition "Milkshake", written by Chad Hugo and Pharrell Williams, published by Universal Music – Careers (BMI), EMI Blackwood Music, Inc. (BMI) and Waters of Nazareth Publishing/Warner Geo Met Ric Music (GMR)

Personnel

- Doja Cat – vocals, songwriting, production
- Cameron Bartolini – songwriting; production, engineering as Cambo
- David Sprecher – songwriting; additional production, engineering as Yeti
- Paul Anka – songwriting
- Chad Hugo – songwriting
- Pharrell Williams – songwriting
- Neal H Pogue – mixing for Roselle New Jersey
- Mike Bozzi – mastering

Credits adapted from "Freak" vinyl liner notes.

== Charts ==
Chart (2020)	Peak position
New Zealand Hot Singles (RMNZ)	5
US Bubbling Under Hot 100 (Billboard)	21
US Digital Song Sales (Billboard)	32
US R&B/Hip-Hop Digital Song Sales (Billboard)	8
US Hot R&B Songs (Billboard)	6

== Certifications ==
Region	Certification	Certified units/sales
Australia (ARIA)	Platinum	70,000^{‡}
Brazil (Pro-Música Brasil)	Platinum	40,000^{‡}
Mexico (AMPROFON)	Platinum+Gold	90,000^{‡}
New Zealand (RMNZ)	Platinum	30,000^{‡}
United Kingdom (BPI)	Silver	200,000^{‡}
United States (RIAA)	Platinum	1,000,000^{‡}
^{‡} Sales+streaming figures based on certification alone.

== Release history ==
Region	Date	Format(s)	Label(s)	Ref.
Various	November 11, 2018	SoundCloud	Self-released	
Various	August 7, 2020	Digital download; streaming	Kemosabe; RCA	
Canada	November 12, 2020	LP	RCA	
United States	November 12, 2020	LP	RCA	
