= Put Your Head on My Shoulder (song) =

1959 single by Paul Anka

Single by Paul Anka
- B-side: "Don't Ever Leave Me"
- Released: August 17, 1959
- Recorded: August 7, 1958
- Studio: Bell Sound (New York City)
- Genre: Pop; doo-wop
- Length: 2:39
- Label: ABC-Paramount
- Songwriter: Paul Anka
- Producer: Don Costa

Paul Anka singles chronology
"Lonely Boy" (1959)	"Put Your Head on My Shoulder" (1959)	"It's Time to Cry" (1959)

Music video
- "Put Your Head on My Shoulder" on YouTube

"Put Your Head on My Shoulder" is a song written by Canadian-born singer-songwriter Paul Anka, recorded in August 1958 at Bell Sound Studios in New York City, twenty days before he recorded his no. 1 hit "Lonely Boy", and was released as a single on August 17, 1959, by ABC-Paramount as catalog number 4510040. It was arranged and conducted by Don Costa. The B-side was "Don't Ever Leave Me". "Put Your Head on My Shoulder" became very successful, reaching No. 2 on the Billboard Hot 100 (kept out of the No. 1 spot by Bobby Darin's recording of "Mack the Knife"). It was his third top five hit of 1959. In Canada the song reached No. 4 on the CHUM Charts. In 2026, "Put Your Head on My Shoulder" was selected by the Library of Congress for preservation in the National Recording Registry for its "cultural, historical or aesthetic importance in the nation's recorded sound heritage."

== Covers and foreign language versions ==
The song was again popular when it was covered and released as a single by The Lettermen in 1968. This version peaked at No. 44 on the Billboard Hot 100; it was more successful on the Easy Listening chart, where it peaked at No. 8.

Mexican singer Enrique Guzmán recorded a Spanish version in the 1960s titled "Tu cabeza en mi hombro". In Latin America, this cover is even more popular than the original. Chilean singer Myriam Hernández recorded this version in a duet with Anka himself in its original version.

Australian singer Derek Redfern covered the song, which peaked at number 71 on the Australian Kent Music Report in 1974.

American singer Leif Garrett released a cover of the song in 1978, which eventually reached number 58 on the Billboard Hot 100.

American rapper and singer Doja Cat sampled it in her 2021 song "Freak." Freak's rhythm and tempo is similar to Anka's original version.

Former-Menudo band Puerto Rican singer Robby Rosa and the Brazilian duo "Gabriela e Tatiana" recorded Portuguese versions in the 1980s, Robby's version being "Com você nos meus sonhos" and Gabriela and Tatiana's version being "Essa mão no meu ombro".

== In popular culture ==
A mashed up version of Doja Cat's "Streets" containing the first 12 seconds of "Put Your Head on My Shoulder" became a TikTok challenge known as the "Silhouette Challenge".

Good Charlotte covered the song in the 2001 film Not Another Teen Movie, modifying the title and lyrics to "Put Your Heads on My Shoulder" to refer to conjoined twins.

In the 2004 videogame Hitman: Contracts, the song is playing on a gramophone in one of the rooms during the second mission of the game.

== Charts ==
Chart (1959–1960)	Peak position
Belgium (Ultratop 50 Flanders)	2
Belgium (Ultratop 50 Wallonia)	11
Canada (CHUM Hit Parade)	4
Netherlands (Single Top 100)	13
UK Singles (OCC)	7
US Billboard Hot 100	2
US Hot R&B/Hip-Hop Songs (Billboard)	12
West Germany (GfK)	25

== Certifications ==
Region	Certification	Certified units/sales
United Kingdom (BPI)	Silver	200,000^{‡}
^{‡} Sales+streaming figures based on certification alone.
