= Bottom girl =

Derogatory term for the top position in a hierarchy of prostitutes

In American pimp culture, the derogatory terms bottom girl, bottom woman, or bottom bitch refer to a female prostitute who sits atop the hierarchy of prostitutes working for a particular procurer (pimp). A bottom woman is usually the prostitute who has been with the procurer the longest and consistently makes the most money. Being the bottom woman gives the prostitute status and power over the other women working for the same procurer; however, the bottom woman also bears many responsibilities.

Women in this role are often, though not always, victims of human trafficking and exploitation. Use of the term "bottom" is often perpetuated by traffickers who exploit female victim-offenders.

In U.S. v. Pipkins, the Eleventh Circuit described the bottom woman's duties as "work[ing] the track in [her pimp's] stead, running interference for and collecting money from the pimp's other prostitutes, [and] look[ing] after the pimp's affairs if the pimp was out of town, incarcerated, or otherwise unavailable." Similarly, the Training Manual of the Hawaiian Prostitution Intervention Program explains that the bottom woman's obligations may include handling finances, and training and recruiting other prostitutes.

== See also ==
- Bitch (insult)
- Third-wave feminism § Reclaiming derogatory terms
- Sex work
- Sex trafficking
