= So High (Doja Cat song) =

2014 single by Doja Cat

Single by Doja Cat

from the EP Purrr!
- Published: November 8, 2012
- Released: March 13, 2014
- Recorded: 2012 (original version); 2014 (studio version)
- Genre: Alternative R&B
- Length: 3:24
- Label: Self-released
- Songwriter: Amala Dlamini
- Producer: Evil Needle

Doja Cat singles chronology
"So High" (2014)	"Go to Town" (2018)

Music video
- "So High (Explicit Version)" on YouTube

"So High" is the debut single by American rapper and singer Doja Cat. She originally self-published an early version of the song exclusively to SoundCloud on November 8, 2012, at the age of 17. On March 13, 2014, a new version was commercially released as the lead single from her debut EP, Purrr!. The musical base of the alternative R&B track is the song "Falling Leaves" by French producer Evil Needle. Doja Cat herself has since expressed retrospective disdain towards the record, citing the lyrics and vocal performance as cringeworthy.

== Background and recording ==
In 2011, Doja Cat began teaching herself how to sing, rap and use GarageBand after dropping out of high school at age 16 while in eleventh grade. She revealed that she never had intentions of singing or rapping until she dropped out and needed a job. Doja Cat would spend a lot of time browsing YouTube for beats and instrumentals which she would add vocals to using the built-in microphone on her MacBook, all while sitting on the mattress on her own bedroom floor. She would eventually use GarageBand to sample "Falling Leaves", a single by French producer Evil Needle, officially released on October 16, 2012. Doja Cat shortly uploaded "So High" to SoundCloud on November 8, 2012, later revealing that this would be the first permanent track on her account to not be deleted shortly afterwards unlike its precursors. She recalls crying after the track amassed 12 views and two likes on the platform.

"So High" would eventually catch the attention of her current manager Lydia Asrat and shortly after would sign to Kemosabe and RCA Records, where she signed a joint record deal as well as a temporary artist management partnership with Roc Nation. While under the two record labels, Doja Cat made her solo debut by releasing a repackaged studio version of "So High" on March 13, 2014. An official music video for the song was released a few days later, and somewhat helped gain the song moderate public attention online. It would serve as the lead single for Doja Cat's debut EP Purrr! (2014), but would also later lose traction when her Roc Nation partnership ended and she failed to find a "solid team". Doja Cat entered a somewhat of a commercial hiatus for several years, but would continue to upload tracks to her SoundCloud account, while the music video for "So High" would also continually gain views during this time.

In an interview with Rolling Stone from December 2021, Doja Cat revealed that she dislikes the song, claiming that she "cringes" each time she hears it. She criticized her vocal performance and claimed the song has "some of the laziest lyrics [she has] ever written", but acknowledged it for having "some of the most beautiful production in music [she's] ever heard".

== Critical reception ==
At the time of its release, Adelle Platon of Vibe wrote that the song mixes "bright vocals with unfiltered bars" and described Doja Cat as a "psychedelic prodigy". Reminiscing several years later, Nastia Voynovskaya of NPR described "So High" as a "downtempo smoking anthem" which was released in "a year when SoundCloud upstarts like ABRA and Shlohmo shifted R&B in a trippier, more zoned-out direction." Juliana Pache of The Fader described the song as "a smooth, repetitive, Soulection-esque number about precisely what the title suggests." Aria Hughes of WWD also described the song as "a stoner song comparing falling in love to smoking weed".

== Commercial performance ==
Upon its release, although "So High" did not chart, it was certified by multiple organizations worldwide. In the United States and Australia, the song was certified Gold by the Recording Industry Association of America (RIAA) and the Australian Recording Industry Association (ARIA) for equivalent sales of 35,000 and 500,000 units in their respective countries. In the United Kingdom, the single was certified Silver by the British Phonographic Industry (BPI) for equivalent sales of 200,000 units in the country. In New Zealand, the single was certified Platinum by Recorded Music New Zealand (RMNZ) for equivalent sales of 30,000 units in the country. In Brazil, the single was certified 2x Platinum by Pro-Música Brasil (PMB) for equivalent sales of 120,000 units in the country.

== Music video ==
The official music video was released on March 25, 2014. Filmed in the salt flats of California, Doja Cat described it as somewhat a "high-budget" project for an artist as small as herself. In the video, she is dressed as a Hindu goddess and primarily stays seated on a lotus-styled throne while doing flowy arm movements. She revealed in an interview that her child experience of practicing Hinduism influenced the aesthetics used in the video, stating: "The world of the video for 'So High' comes from my personal life, my past, it is not something that came out of nowhere." Doja Cat would later become a subject of cancel culture as she began gaining popularity, with some people accusing the music video for "So High" of "sexualizing and appropriating Hindu culture". In response to this, she stated in December 2021 that "If I knew not to do that, I probably wouldn't have done it [...] When something is so sacred to many people, I think it's good to be more sensitive about it and just kind of back away."

== Live performances ==
Doja Cat began performing "So High" at several small local venues and festivals in and around Los Angeles. She would also support musician Theophilus London on tour in 2015 and perform "So High" to open each show. An acoustic studio performance of the song was released to YouTube in September 2014. Patrick Montes of Hypebeast noted that with the "new dialed-down version, the modern, blog-friendly R&B/pop gloss of the original [was] eschewed in favor of a more soulful sound that wouldn’t be out of place at smoky lounge’s jazz night." Doja Cat told Noisey:

"So High" was a song that I ended up sometimes playing acoustically during live performances… I really dug hearing how the melody could be highlighted and we decided why not get a live acoustic version on film. I felt very lucky that the Chargaux girls were in Los Angeles to lay it down. We did one take for the audio, which kept it raw, and stayed true to the natural energy we intended to capture.

== Remixes and media ==
"So High" received remix versions by both American producer StéLouse, and Dutch DJ San Holo. At the time of its release in 2014, the song caught the attention of people such as Australian DJ Elizabeth Rose, labelmate Becky G, and American singer Billie Eilish when she was just 12 years old. The official music video has amassed 89 million views on YouTube as of March 2024.

== Certifications ==
Certifications for "So High"
Region	Certification	Certified units/sales
Australia (ARIA)	Gold	35,000^{‡}
Brazil (Pro-Música Brasil)	2× Platinum	120,000^{‡}
New Zealand (RMNZ)	Platinum	30,000^{‡}
United Kingdom (BPI)	Silver	200,000^{‡}
United States (RIAA)	Gold	500,000^{‡}
^{‡} Sales+streaming figures based on certification alone.
