= Purrr! =

EP by Doja Cat
- Released: August 5, 2014
- Recorded: 2012–2014
- Genre: Alternative R&B
- Length: 18:03
- Label: Self-released
- Producers: Iman Omari; Mndsgn; Evil Needle; Dream Koala; Yeti Beats

Doja Cat chronology
Purrr! (2014)	Amala (2018)

Singles from Purrr!
- 1. "So High" Released: March 13, 2014

Purrr! is the debut extended play (EP) by American rapper and singer Doja Cat. It was released independently on August 5, 2014. Many of the songs were recorded by Doja Cat in a DIY-style using a variety of instrumentals which she found online from producers such as Mndsgn, Evil Needle, and Dream Koala. Iman Omari and Yeti Beats also helped in the EP's production. "So High" was released as the EP's sole single.

== Background ==
On March 13, 2014, the EP's only single "So High" was commercially released by MAU Records, following it being previously published by Doja on November 8, 2012 via SoundCloud. At the time of Purrr!'s release, "So High" had amassed over 712 thousand streams on SoundCloud and over 240 thousand views on the official music video.

== Critical reception ==
David Turner of The Fader highlighted the song "Control" as "a breezy seaside joyride built on slow builds and wavy echoes" and also praised Doja Cat's "spacey singing style" throughout the record. Briana Cheng of Dazed wrote that on "No Police", she "fiercely meows" and "sassily" raps and sings over a "mild" guitar riff as part of the "mollifying" beat, notably humming from the police sirens from Lil Wayne's 2008 single "Mrs. Officer". Petar Kujundzic of Hypebeast described Purrr! as "a fine list of bass-heavy, alternative R&B tracks" and highlighted the song "No Police" for "offering the best of her vocal and lyrical abilities". Writing for Illsociety, Kelly Hawkins praised Doja Cat's "brazen raps and airy vocals".

== Track listing ==
Purrr! track listing
No.	Title	Writer(s)	Producer(s)	Length
1.	"Beautiful"	Cameron Bartolini; Iman Omari; Coco O.; Robin Hannibal; Amala Dlamini	Omari	3:47
2.	"Nunchucks ft. Everett Bierer"	Dlamini	Mndsgn^{[a]}	3:15
3.	"So High"	Dlamini	Evil Needle^{[b]}	3:20
4.	"No Police"	Dlamini	Dream Koala^{[c]}	4:00
5.	"Control"	Dlamini	Yeti Beats	3:40
Total length:				18:03

=== Samples ===
- ^{^[a]} "Nunchucks" is built around the musical base of "Legwarmrs", performed by Mndsgn.
- ^{^[b]} "So High" is built around the musical base of "Falling Leaves", performed by Evil Needle.
- ^{^[c]} "No Police" is built around the musical base of "We Can't Be Friends", performed by Dream Koala.

== Release history ==
Release dates and formats for Purrr!
Region	Date	Format(s)	Label	Ref.
Various	August 5, 2014	Digital download; streaming	Self-released	
