= MTV Video Music Award for Artist of the Year =

Annual music video award

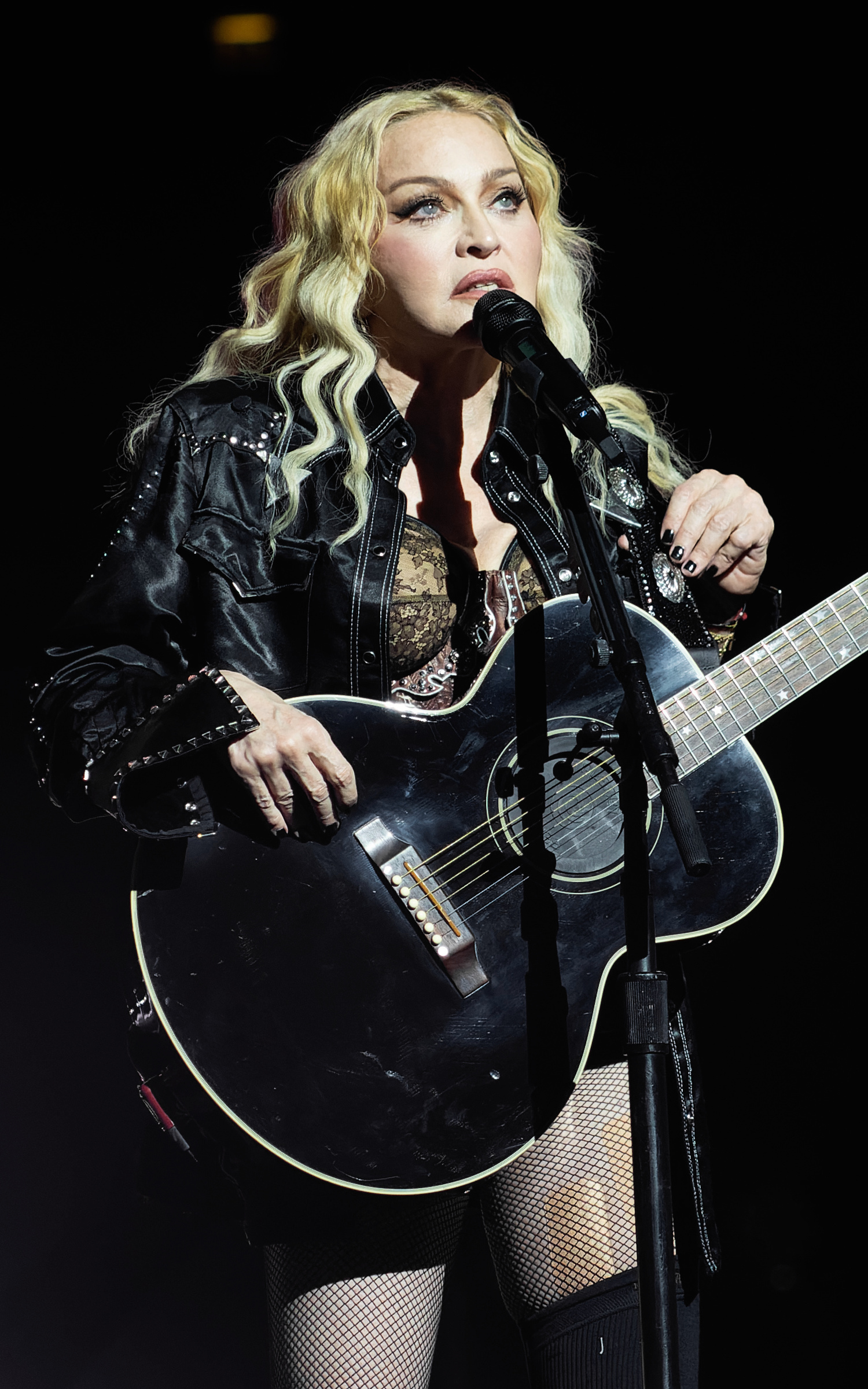
- Madonna is the most recent recipient.
- Country: United States
- Presented by: MTV
- First award: 2017
- Currently held by: Madonna (2026)

Highlights
- Most wins: Taylor Swift & Lady Gaga (2)
- Most nominations: Ariana Grande (6)
- Website: VMA website

The MTV Video Music Award for Artist of the Year is given at the annual MTV Video Music Awards. It was first introduced at the 2017 MTV Video Music Awards, replacing both the MTV Video Music Award for Best Male Video and Best Female Video as MTV wanted to eliminate gender-specific awards.

Ed Sheeran was the first recipient of the award in 2017. Ariana Grande has the most nominations in the category with six, winning the award in 2019. The Jonas Brothers is the only group that has been nominated for this award, receiving a nomination in 2019.

== Recipients ==
=== 2010s ===
Recipients
Year (Note: Each year is linked to the article about the MTV Video Music Awards held that year.)	Winner(s)	Nominees	Ref.
2017	Ed Sheeran	Ariana Grande; Kendrick Lamar; Lorde; Bruno Mars; The Weeknd	
2018	Camila Cabello	Cardi B; Drake; Ariana Grande; Post Malone; Bruno Mars	
2019	Ariana Grande	Cardi B; Billie Eilish; Halsey; Jonas Brothers; Shawn Mendes	

=== 2020s ===
Recipients
Year	Winner(s)	Nominees	Ref.
2020	Lady Gaga	Justin Bieber; DaBaby; Megan Thee Stallion; Post Malone; The Weeknd	
2021	Justin Bieber	Doja Cat; Ariana Grande; Megan Thee Stallion; Olivia Rodrigo; Taylor Swift	
2022	Bad Bunny	Drake; Jack Harlow; Lil Nas X; Lizzo; Ed Sheeran; Harry Styles	
2023	Taylor Swift	Beyoncé; Doja Cat; Karol G; Nicki Minaj; Shakira	
2024	Taylor Swift	Bad Bunny; Sabrina Carpenter; Eminem; Ariana Grande; SZA	
2025	Lady Gaga	Bad Bunny; Beyoncé; Kendrick Lamar; Taylor Swift; Morgan Wallen; The Weeknd	
2026	Madonna	Ariana Grande; Bruno Mars; Morgan Wallen; Sabrina Carpenter; Taylor Swift	

== Artists with multiple nominations ==
6 nominations

- Ariana Grande

5 nominations

- Taylor Swift

3 nominations

- The Weeknd
- Bruno Mars
- Drake
- Bad Bunny

2 nominations

- Beyoncé
- Cardi B
- Doja Cat
- Ed Sheeran
- Justin Bieber
- Kendrick Lamar
- Lady Gaga
- Megan Thee Stallion
- Morgan Wallen
- Post Malone
- Sabrina Carpenter
