= Doja Cat =

American rapper (born 1995)

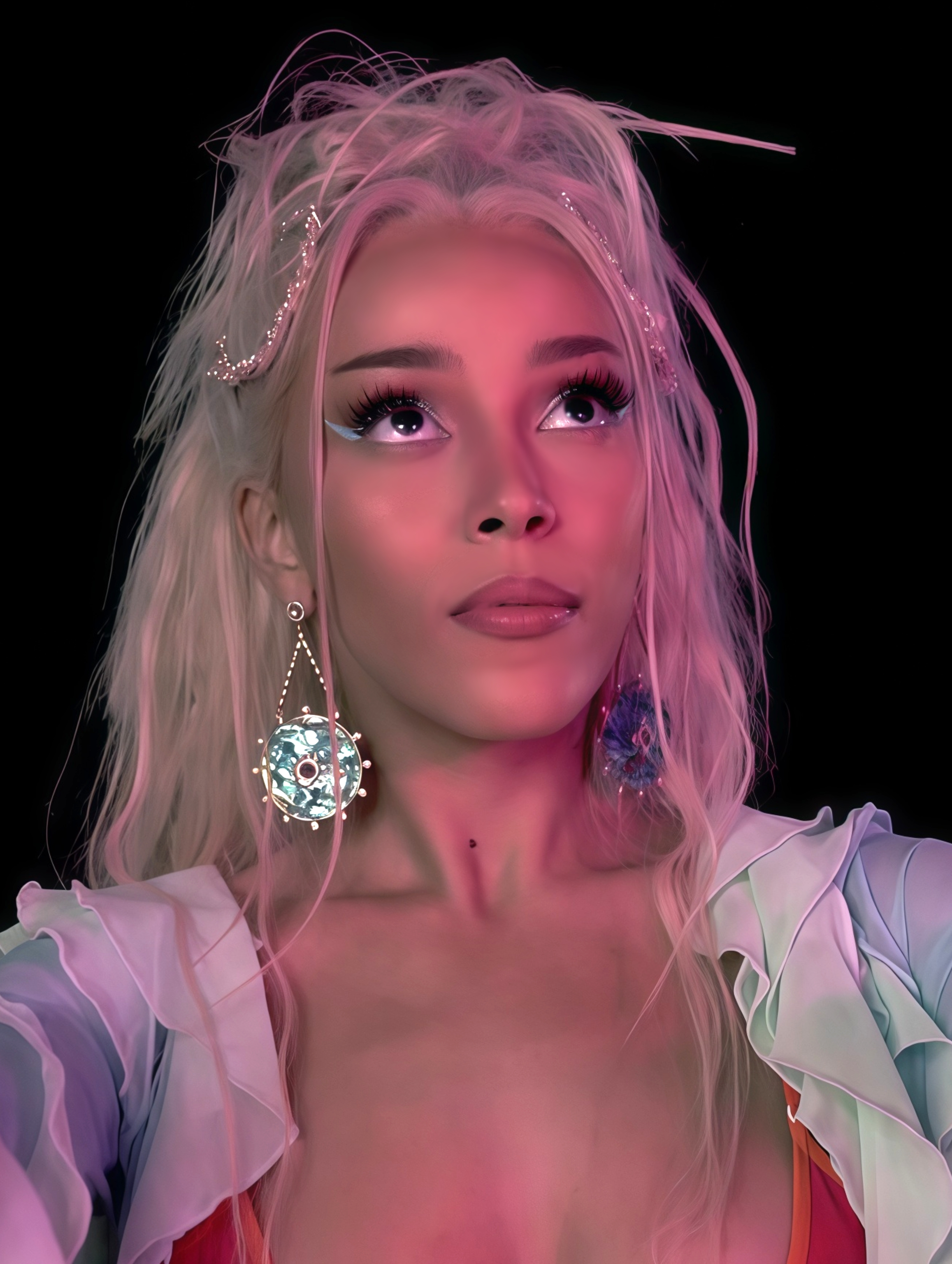
- Doja Cat in 2021

Background information
- Born: Amala Ratna Zandile Dlamini; October 21, 1995 (age 31); Los Angeles, California, U.S.
- Genres: Pop-rap; Hip-pop; pop; R&B
- Occupations: Rapper; singer-songwriter; record producer
- Works: Doja Cat discography
- Years active: 2012–present
- Labels: Kemosabe; RCA
- Awards: Full list
- Website: dojacat.com
- Father: Dumisani Dlamini

Amala Ratna Zandile Dlamini (born October 21, 1995), known professionally as Doja Cat (/ˈdoʊdʒə/ DOH-jə), is an American rapper and singer-songwriter. Regarded as the "Queen of Pop-Rap", (Note: Doja Cat has been referred to as the "Queen of Pop-Rap" by numerous publications, including NBC News, CBS News, CNN News, BeIN Sports, The Guardian, Cosmopolitan, The Economic Times, TV Guide/TV Insider, Daily Hive, The Music, Time Out, Tempo, The Cincinnati Enquirer, Staten Island Advance, Austin American-Statesman, MyLondon, and Tribun Network.) she is known for her musical versatility, live performance skills and humorous internet presence. Billboard named her "one of the world's biggest pop stars" and "one of the defining pop stars of this era", and Time listed her as one of the world's most influential people in 2023.

Doja Cat first gained attention in 2012 with her song "So High", which was independently published on SoundCloud, later leading to a commercial release and the independent release of her debut extended play, Purrr! (2014). After signing a recording contract with Kemosabe and RCA Records, she released her debut studio album, Amala (2018), which featured her viral single "Mooo!". Her second studio album, Hot Pink (2019), spawned the single "Say So", which became her first to top the US Billboard Hot 100. Her third studio album, Planet Her (2021), produced a string of top-ten hits, including "Kiss Me More", "Need to Know", and "Woman", with the former winning a Grammy Award for Best Pop Duo/Group Performance. Her fourth studio album, Scarlet (2023), adopted a hip-hop-oriented sound and was led by her second US number-one single, "Paint the Town Red", while her fifth album, Vie (2025), marked a return to her pop roots.

Doja Cat is one of the best-selling female rappers of all time, with over 34 million records sold between 2018 and 2022. In 2024, Billboard ranked her as the 24th top woman artist and 2nd female rapper of the 21st century—five years after her first charted record (2019). Since 2020, she has won hundreds of accolades, including a Grammy Award from 19 nominations, six Billboard Music Awards, five American Music Awards, six MTV Video Music Awards and eight iHeartRadio Music Awards. (Note: Including six iHeartRadio Titanium Awards for one billion spins on iHeartRadio stations.)

== Early life and education ==
Amala Ratna Zandile Dlamini was born on October 21, 1995, in the Tarzana neighborhood of Los Angeles, California. Her mother, Deborah Sawyer, is an American graphic designer of Jewish heritage, and her father, Dumisani Dlamini, is a South African performer of Zulu descent, best known for starring as Crocodile in the original Broadway cast of the musical Sarafina! and the 1992 film adaptation. The two had a brief relationship after meeting in New York City where Dumisani performed on Broadway, but he was too busy on tour to spend time with Amala and her brother. He said that he left his family in the U.S. for South Africa out of homesickness in the hopes that they would join him there. He has also claimed that he has a "healthy" relationship with his daughter and that her management team had tried to block all his attempts to contact her out of the fear that they "might lose her". Nevertheless, Dlamini has said on multiple occasions that she is estranged from her father, stating that she "never met him" and later accused him of being a deadbeat to her and her brother. During a 2025 interview with Angie Martinez on her podcast, Doja Cat revealed that she has three additional half-siblings from her mother's side.

Soon after her birth, Dlamini moved from Tarzana to Rye, New York, where she lived for five years with her maternal grandmother, an architect and painter. At the age of eight, Dlamini returned to California with her mother and brother to live at the Sai Anantam Ashram, a commune in Agoura Hills. Its spiritual director was jazz musician Alice Coltrane. The family went on to practice Hinduism for four years. Dlamini wore head-covering scarves and sang bhajans while at the temple, and has said that she felt like she could not "be a kid" during her time there.

Her family then moved a couple miles north to neighboring Oak Park, California, where she started attending dance lessons and experienced a "sporty childhood", often skateboarding and visiting Malibu for surf camps. Dlamini and her brother were also subjected to racial prejudice as some of the only mixed-race children in the area.

As she grew older and moved away from the ashram, she attended breakdancing classes and joined a professional poplocking troupe, with whom she competed in dance battles throughout Los Angeles while still attending high school. Her aunt, a vocal coach, had given Dlamini singing lessons to help her audition for Central Los Angeles Area New High School No. 9, a performing arts high school in Los Angeles. She frequently skipped school to participate in online chatrooms. After becoming discouraged about her education and career path, Dlamini claims that she realized in eleventh grade that "performing and music was all [she] ever cared about." She eventually dropped out at age 16 while in her junior year, attributing this decision to her struggles with attention deficit hyperactivity disorder (ADHD), saying that "it felt like I was stuck in one spot and everybody else was progressing constantly."

== Career ==
=== 2012–2019: Music beginnings and Amala ===
Doja Cat has described life after dropping out of school as "messy", claiming that she slept on the floor and spent "all night and day" browsing the internet, looking for beats and instrumentals from YouTube which she downloaded and used to create her own music. After becoming fascinated with internet culture and websites like eBaum's World and Myspace, she taught herself to sing, rap and use GarageBand while at home without a job, frequently making music and uploading it to SoundCloud. In late 2012, "So High" became the first permanent upload on her SoundCloud account. Doja Cat began her career in the Los Angeles underground hip-hop scene, performing at parties and cyphers, and connecting with rappers such as Busdriver, Ill Camille and VerBS, the latter of whom claims to have helped hone her craft and find her first gig. It was during this time that she met producer Jerry "Tizhimself" Powell, who had stumbled upon her SoundCloud account. He introduced her to record producer Yeti Beats, who invited her to record at his studio in the neighborhood of Echo Park, which also served as "an oasis of sorts for Doja to escape from the turmoil at home". Yeti Beats then connected her with Kemosabe Records, an imprint of RCA Records, where she signed under label executive Dr. Luke and his publishing company Prescription Songs at the age of 17. This deal also came with a temporary artist management partnership with Roc Nation.

In August 2014, Doja Cat released her debut EP, Purrr!, described as "spacey, eastern-influenced R&B" by The Fader. "So High" was repackaged and released as her solo commercial debut single prior to the EP's release, and was later featured on the Fox series Empire in the third episode of the show's first season. In mid-2015, Doja Cat temporarily signed to OG Maco's label, OGG. Following the signing, in late 2016, Maco and Doja Cat collaborated on the song "Monster", from Maco's 2017 mixtape, Children of The Rage. She had started experiencing writer's block, which led her to decline American singer Billie Eilish's offer to feature on what would later become her popular 2017 single "Bellyache". Doja Cat would stop releasing music for a while amid what she describes as a "creative limbo", which was influenced by her record labels not paying her much attention, as well as the effects of "finding herself" and smoking too much marijuana.

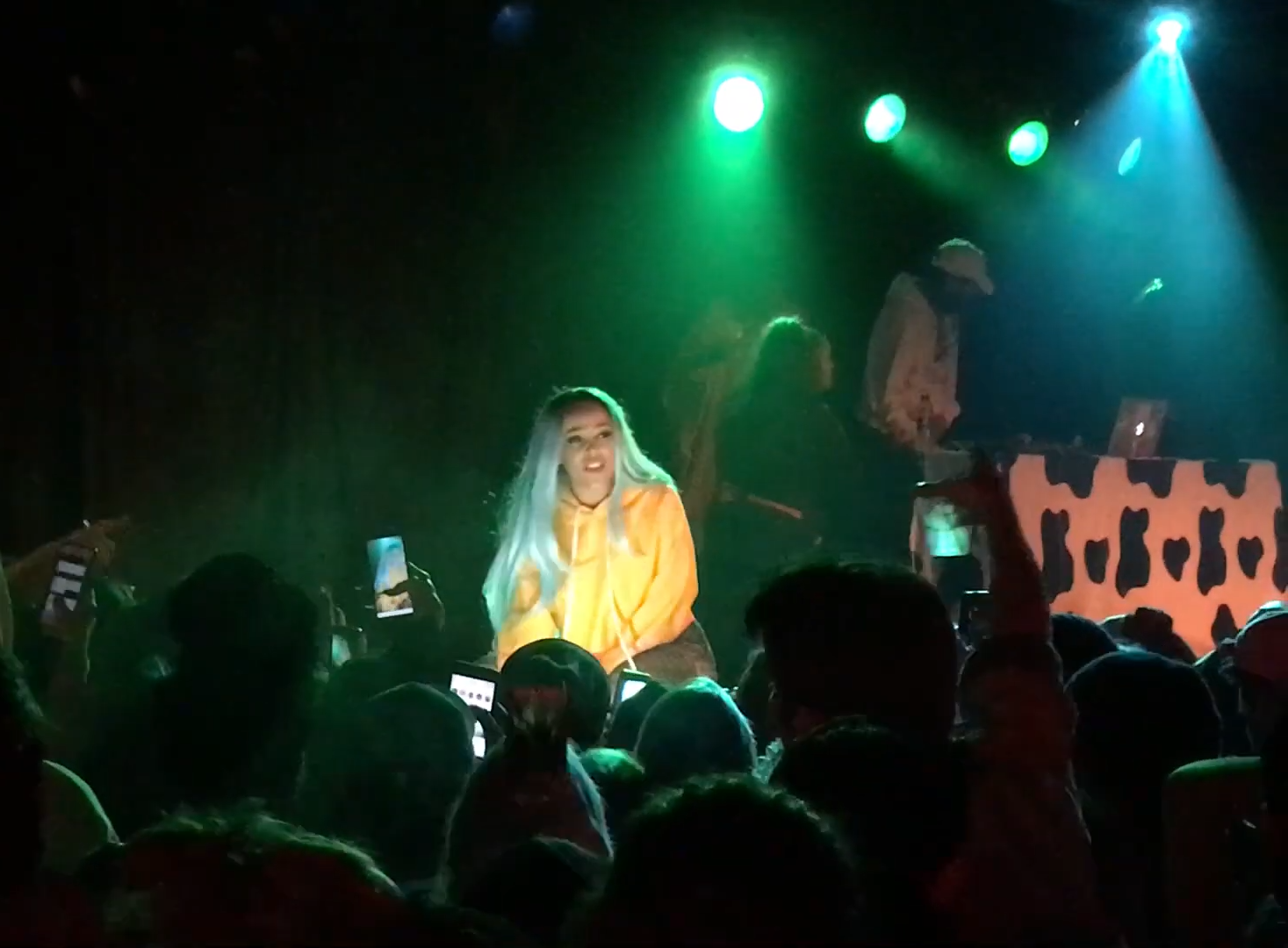
Doja Cat performing in October 2018

Her first major commercial release in four years, Doja Cat released the song "Roll with Us" in February 2018 following a brief hiatus. The following month, she released "Go to Town" as the lead single from her debut album, with an accompanying music video. "Candy" was released as the album's second single that same month. The track would later become a sleeper hit after a "dance challenge" on the video-sharing platform TikTok went viral in late 2019. The single consequently charted in countries such as Australia, Canada and the United States, with the latter having the song peak at 86 on the Billboard Hot 100, making this her first solo entry on the chart.

On March 30, 2018, Doja Cat's debut studio album Amala was released through RCA and Kemosabe Records, and included the three singles. Its release was largely uneventful, as it was ignored by critics and failed to chart in any market. Doja Cat has since expressed strong disdain toward the record, claiming that it doesn't entirely represent her as an artist and that it isn't a "finished album" since she was constantly partying or high on marijuana during its recording. She claims it was also rushed in order to meet deadlines from the record labels who paid it "almost no support".

In August 2018, Doja Cat self-published the homemade music video for "Mooo!", a novelty song with absurdist lyrics in which she fantasizes about being a cow. The video promptly garnered viral success as an internet meme, attaining over three million views in one week. Due to popular demand following this viral success, the single version of "Mooo!" was released onto digital platforms later that month as the lead single from the deluxe edition of Amala. This was followed by the release of the second single, "Tia Tamera" featuring Rico Nasty, and its accompanying music video in February 2019. The full deluxe edition of Amala was released on March 1, 2019, and featured the bonus tracks "Mooo!", "Tia Tamera" and "Juicy". The success of "Mooo!" is believed to have "irrefutably proved" to her record labels that Doja Cat was a marketable artist, which led them to start paying more attention to her.

=== 2019–2020: Breakthrough with Hot Pink ===
A remix version of Doja Cat's song "Juicy", from the deluxe version of Amala, added a verse from American rapper Tyga and was released alongside a music video in August 2019 as the lead single from her second studio album. Following the release of the remix, the song debuted at number 83 on the Billboard Hot 100, marking Doja Cat's first entry on the chart, and ultimately peaked at number 41. The Recording Industry Association of America (RIAA) would later award the song a platinum certification in the United States. The song's success led to Amala debuting for the first time on the Billboard 200 chart that same month. In October 2019, Doja Cat released "Bottom Bitch", the second single from her second album. This was followed by the release of the single "Rules" alongside the announcement of her second studio album Hot Pink. Hot Pink was released on November 7, 2019, to generally favorable reviews. The album would eventually peak at number 9 on the Billboard 200. Doja Cat was meant to feature on a track titled "Broward Coward" from an early version of the late XXXTentacion's fourth studio album, Bad Vibes Forever, however the song was ultimately scrapped when the album tracklist was completely revised for its posthumous release in December 2019. She later released the single "Boss Bitch" as part of the soundtrack for the 2020 film Birds of Prey.

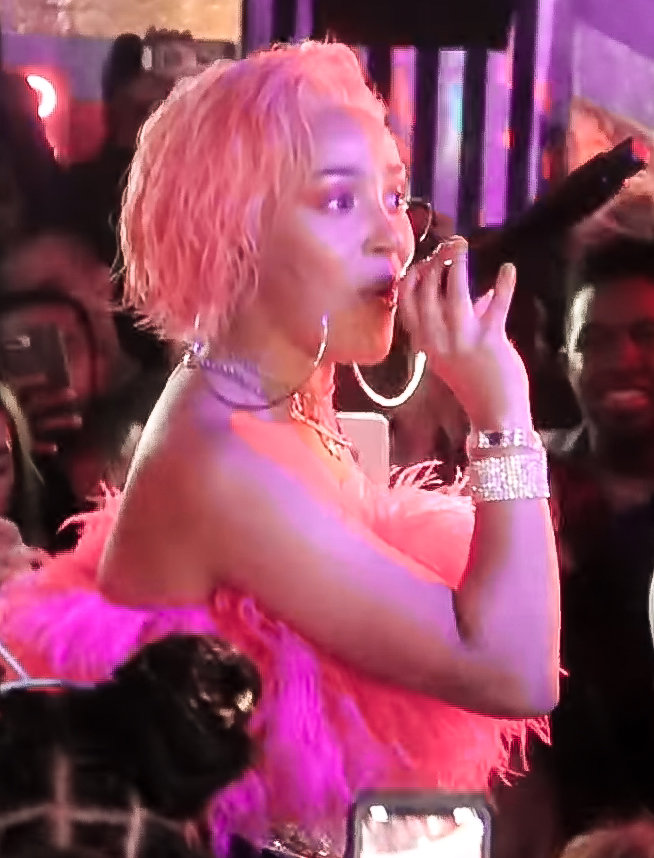
Doja Cat performing at the Hot Pink release party in 2019

In January 2020, "Say So" was sent to radio to become the fourth single off of her album Hot Pink. The song was originally released alongside the album in November 2019, but gained wider popularity through the video-sharing platform TikTok. She performed the song on The Tonight Show Starring Jimmy Fallon in February 2020. The next day, she released the music video for the song, directed by Hannah Lux Davis. The solo version of "Say So" peaked at number five on the Hot 100, becoming her first top-ten single, and was the most streamed song of 2020 by a female artist in the United States. In May 2020, following the release of a remix of "Say So" featuring Nicki Minaj, the single topped the Billboard Hot 100, becoming the first number-one single for both artists and the first ever female rap collaboration to peak atop the chart.

In March 2020, Doja Cat was set to embark on the Hot Pink Tour in support of the album, before it was postponed due to the COVID-19 pandemic. She was featured on a remix of the Weeknd's single "In Your Eyes" in May 2020, as well as on the single "Shimmy" by rapper Lil Wayne from the deluxe version of his 2020 album Funeral. In June, she was featured on the single "Pussy Talk" by the rap duo City Girls. She released the music video for her single "Like That". She also uploaded the demo song "Unisex Freestyle" to SoundCloud in late June 2020. At the 20th BET Awards, Doja Cat was nominated for two awards, Best Female Hip Hop Artist and Video of the Year. In August 2020, her song "Freak", which had been on SoundCloud since 2018, was officially released on digital platforms.

In May 2020, a 2015 song by Doja Cat titled "Dindu Nuffin" resurfaced. "Dindu Nuffin" is an alt-right term used to ridicule African-American detainees protesting their innocence. After apologizing, Doja Cat said that although the song was intended to flip the term's meaning, it was a "bad decision". Doja Cat denied that the song was a response to the death of Sandra Bland, calling the allegation "one of the most awful rumors that I've ever encountered." She took to Instagram to address accusations after footage began circulating of her on Tinychat in a chat room saying "nigger". She apologized to those offended and said she should not have been on certain chat room sites, although she maintained that she had never been involved in any racist conversations.

Doja Cat won the award for Push Best New Artist at the 2020 MTV Video Music Awards, where she also performed a medley of the songs "Say So" and "Like That". She was credited as a lead artist on the remix for Chloe x Halle's song "Do It", which also featured City Girls and Mulatto, the following month. She was featured alongside Australian singer Sia on the track "Del Mar" from Puerto Rican singer Ozuna's 2020 album Enoc, also released in September. The "Juicy" remix featuring Tyga was nominated for Top R&B Song at the 2020 Billboard Music Awards. In October 2020, Doja Cat was featured on American singer Bebe Rexha's single "Baby, I'm Jealous", the lead single from Rexha's second studio album, Better Mistakes. She performed a burlesque-themed medley of "Juicy", "Say So" and "Like That" at the 2020 Billboard Music Awards, inspired by Chicago and Moulin Rouge. That same month, Doja Cat performed both "Baby, I'm Jealous" with Rexha and "Del Mar" with Ozuna on The Tonight Show Starring Jimmy Fallon and Jimmy Kimmel Live!, respectively. Doja Cat was featured on the album track "Motive" from Ariana Grande's 2020 album Positions, which peaked at number 32 on the Billboard Hot 100, becoming both her highest debut and second-ever top 40 entry.

Doja Cat performed a metal rendition of "Say So" at the 2020 MTV Europe Music Awards ceremony, where she also won the award for Best New Act. Her performance was criticized for sampling Plini's "Handmade Cities" without permission. The following month, Plini reported that he received an apologetic message from Doja Cat through social media.

Doja Cat won the award for The New Artist of 2020 at the 46th People's Choice Awards. She additionally won both New Artist of the Year and Favorite Soul/R&B Female Artist at the 2020 American Music Awards ceremony, where she performed "Baby, I'm Jealous" with Bebe Rexha. On December 24, 2020, Doja Cat released a series of videos on her YouTube channel named "Hot Pink Sessions" where she performed three songs twice with two different "looks". On December 31, 2020, Doja Cat performed "Say So", "Like That", and "Juicy" at the annual Dick Clark's New Year's Rockin' Eve show.

According to sales in the United States, Billboard ranked Doja Cat at number five on both the Top New Artists of 2020 and Top Female Artists of 2020 charts. After her on-demand audio streams in the U.S. increased by 300% from 2019, Rolling Stone ranked her at number one on their list of the ten biggest breakthrough artists of 2020. Forbes named Doja Cat "one of the top breakout stars of 2020" while including her on their annual 30 Under 30 list. Doja Cat was the fourth most-Googled musician of 2020 in the United States.

=== 2021: Continued success with Planet Her ===
On January 7, 2021, Doja Cat was featured on the single "Best Friend" by rapper Saweetie, and appeared in the accompanying music video. The following week, Doja Cat appeared alongside Megan Thee Stallion on the remix of "34+35" by Ariana Grande. Following the release of the remix, the song reached a new peak of number two on the Billboard Hot 100. In early 2021, Doja's song "Streets" became a sleeper hit after live performances of the song went viral on TikTok. TikTok also spawned a viral challenge which uses a mashup of "Streets" and "Put Your Head on My Shoulder" by Paul Anka. This caused the song to enter the Billboard Hot 100, where it peaked at number 16. Doja Cat received three nominations at the 63rd Annual Grammy Awards: Best New Artist as an artist, and Record of the Year and Best Pop Solo Performance for "Say So". In 2021, she was placed on "Time's 100 Next" list, which highlights 100 emerging figures, with her write-up being penned by American rapper Lil Nas X.

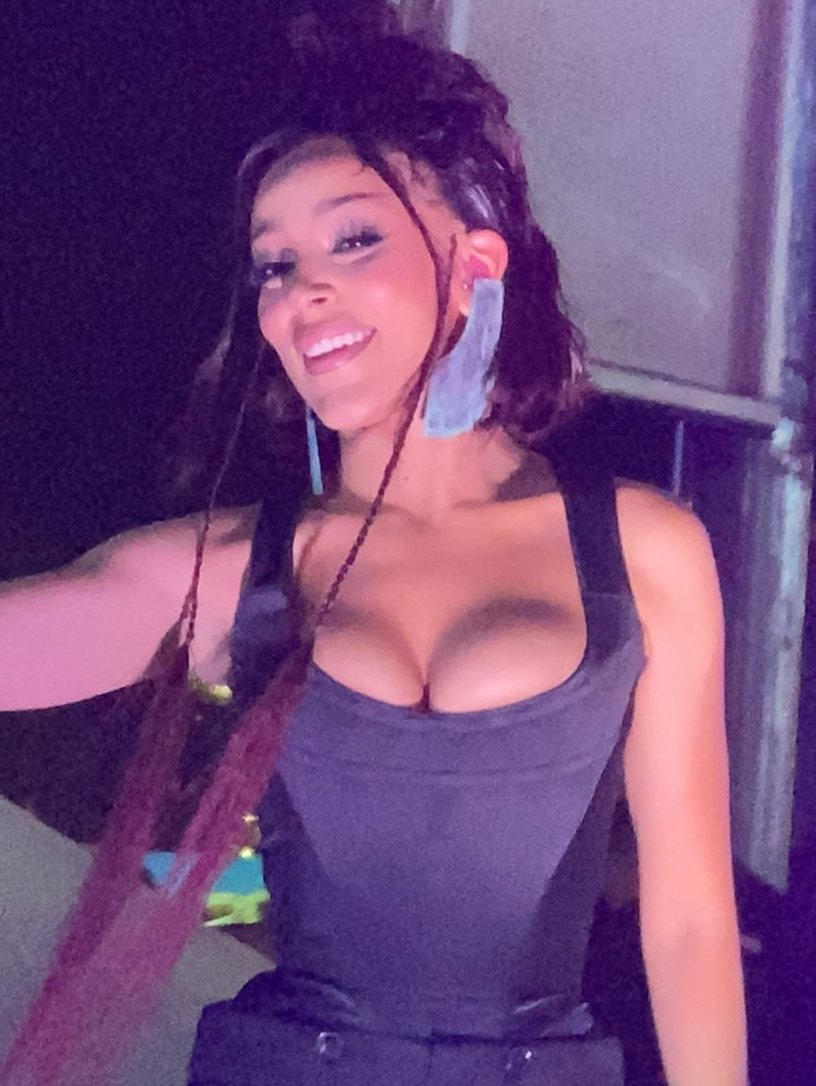
Doja Cat performing in 2021

Doja Cat revealed the title of her third studio album, Planet Her, in a March 2021 interview with V. On April 10, the song "Kiss Me More" featuring SZA was released alongside a music video as the lead single for the album. It received critical acclaim, and commercial success, spending nineteen consecutive weeks within the top 10 of the Billboard Hot 100, breaking the record for the most weeks in the top 10 by a female collaboration. The song peaked at number three and became Doja Cat's third top 10 hit. Later that month, Doja Cat performed the songs "Best Friend" with Saweetie, "Rules", "Streets" and a solo version of "Kiss Me More" at Triller's inaugural Fight Club event. On April 23, 2021, Doja Cat launched an NFT marketplace titled "Juicy Drops". In May 2021, Doja Cat won the award for Top Female R&B Artist at the 2021 Billboard Music Awards, where she performed "Kiss Me More" with SZA. Later that month, she performed a solo version of the same song in a medley with "Streets" and "Say So" at the 2021 iHeartRadio Music Awards, where she won the award for Best New Pop Artist.

The song "Need to Know" was released alongside a music video as the first promotional single from Planet Her on June 11, 2021. Doja Cat wrote that it was released in anticipation of the "more important" second single, which was confirmed to be "You Right" with the Weeknd. Doja Cat officially announced the release of Planet Her and revealed its tracklist and album art via social media a few hours before the release of "Need to Know". The album was released to generally positive reviews, and opened at number two on the Billboard 200 where it remained for another two weeks, becoming the first album to spend its first three weeks at number two on the chart since The Pinkprint (2014) by Nicki Minaj in January 2015. It spent over six months in the chart's top ten, the first project by a female rapper to do so. Elsewhere, it topped the charts in New Zealand, and landed in the top 5 in countries such as the United Kingdom, Australia, Norway and Ireland. It became the 10th and 13th best-selling album in 2021 and 2022 respectively, according to the International Federation of the Phonographic Industry (IFPI).

Doja Cat guest starred as the temporary romantic interest of American rapper and comedian Lil Dicky in the second season of the TV series Dave, which premiered on June 16, 2021. On September 10, she was announced as a Pepsi ambassador and starred in an advertisement in which she performs a modern reenactment of the song "You're the One That I Want" from the musical film Grease, as part of a campaign celebrating the launch of the Pepsi-Cola Soda Shop. Her first-ever gig as a television presenter, Doja Cat hosted the 2021 MTV Video Music Awards ceremony, where she also performed the songs "Been Like This" and "You Right". She won the awards for Best Collaboration (shared with SZA for "Kiss Me More") and Best Art Direction (shared with Saweetie for "Best Friend"), among nominations for Artist of the Year, Video of the Year and Best Visual Effects. It is the first time in history where a nominee in the Video of the Year category hosted the ceremony in that same year. Doja Cat was praised for her presenting abilities, with Pitchfork noting that she "reinvent[ed] award-show hosting".

Doja Cat was featured on the song "Scoop" from Lil Nas X's debut studio album Montero (2021), which was released on September 17, and then on the song "Icy Hot" from American rapper Young Thug's second studio album Punk (2021), which was released on October 15. That same month, she reached number one on the Billboard Hot 100 Songwriters chart for the first time in her career, and also became the first rapper to place three top 10 songs on the US Mainstream Top 40, with "You Right", "Need to Know" and "Kiss Me More". She featured alongside Saweetie on French Montana's song "Handstand" from his fourth studio album They Got Amnesia (2021). The music video for Planet Her's fourth single, "Woman", was released on December 3. According to Billboard, Doja Cat closed 2021 as the bestselling female R&B and hip-hop artist in the US, and the fourth bestselling female artist overall, additionally placing six songs on the year-end Hot 100. Planet Her was also the sixth best-selling album in the US, and the fifth most streamed album globally on Spotify in 2021. She later won the awards for Female Rapper of the Year and Performer of the Year at the 2022 XXL Awards. She received nominations for eight awards at the 64th Annual Grammy Awards, the most for any female artist. "Kiss Me More" won the award for Best Pop Duo Performance, while her other nominations included Album of the Year (Planet Her and Montero), Record of the Year ("Kiss Me More"), Song of the Year ("Kiss Me More"), Best Pop Vocal Album (Planet Her), Best Rap Song ("Best Friend") and Best Melodic Rap Performance ("Need to Know").

=== 2022–2023: Scarlet and stylistic shift ===
In February 2022, Doja Cat released a cover of the song "Celebrity Skin" by American rock band Hole, as part of a Taco Bell commercial in which she starred, and premiered it at the Super Bowl LVI. The cover contains reworked lyrics written by Doja Cat and Hole frontwoman Courtney Love. Later that month, her second collaboration with Tyga, entitled "Freaky Deaky", was released as a single alongside a music video directed by Christian Breslauer. She contributed to the soundtrack for Baz Luhrmann's biographical film Elvis (2022) with the song "Vegas", released on May 6, 2022, as its lead single. In June 2022, the track "I Like You (A Happier Song)" by Post Malone featuring Doja Cat was released as the third single from the former's fourth studio album, Twelve Carat Toothache (2023). The track would later earn Doja Cat a nomination for Best Pop Duo/Group Performance at the 65th Annual Grammy Awards, where she also earned nominations for Record of the Year ("Woman"), Best Pop Solo Performance ("Woman"), Best Music Video ("Woman"), and Best Rap Performance ("Vegas"). Doja Cat was made the subject and namesake of the song "Doja" by British rapper Central Cee, which was released in July 2022 and achieved global success, becoming the most streamed UK rap song on Spotify.

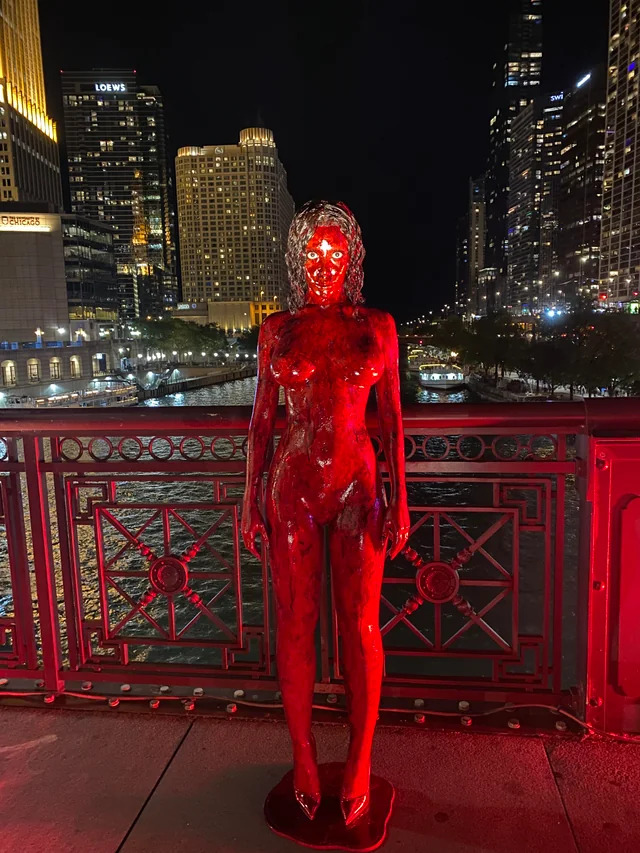
Wax figure of Doja Cat's Scarlet alter ego placed at the Chicago Riverwalk in 2023

Doja Cat later began sharing her experiences of career burnout, expressing her disdain for "unnecessary" obligations, while admitting that she was no longer enjoying her career. Doja Cat continued to publicize her frustrations during a South American festival tour in March 2022. After an incident involving Paraguayan fans, which followed a storm that prompted the cancellation of her scheduled show, she posted to Twitter: "Everything is dead to me, music is dead, and I'm a fucking fool for ever thinking I was made for this... This shit ain't for me so I'm out. Y'all take care." In early 2023, Doja Cat began teasing her fourth studio album with the working title of Hellmouth. Prior to this, she had asserted that the album would be "predominantly rap", a callback to the musical style of her earliest works, and an effort to diverge from the "pink and soft things" and "pop and glittery sounds" that she has become noted for, notably denouncing her previous two albums as "cash grabs" and "digestible pop hits". She also adopted a darker esthetic and appearance, which she described as "punk", "experimental" and "manic", while some fans deemed these changes "demonic", and accused her of being a Satanist, and a member of the Illuminati.

In mid-June 2023, Doja Cat released the album's first promotional single, titled "Attention", alongside an accompanying music video directed by Tanu Muino. The album's lead single, "Paint the Town Red", was released in early August 2023 to commercial success, breaking a number of streaming records, and becoming her first solo song to top the charts in both the United States and the United Kingdom, among several other countries and the Billboard Global 200 chart. It also peaked at number one on the Billboard Global Excl. US chart, the first rap song to do so. The album's title was later revealed to be Scarlet in mid-August 2023. The second promotional single, "Demons", was released in early September 2023, alongside a music video directed by Christian Breslauer and co-starring American actress Christina Ricci.

Scarlet was released to mostly positive reviews on September 22, 2023, and debuted within the top 5 in the United States, the United Kingdom and Canada. Doja Cat then embarked on the opening North American leg of the Scarlet Tour, her first arena tour featuring rappers Doechii and Ice Spice as supporting acts.

=== 2024–present: Vie and beyond ===
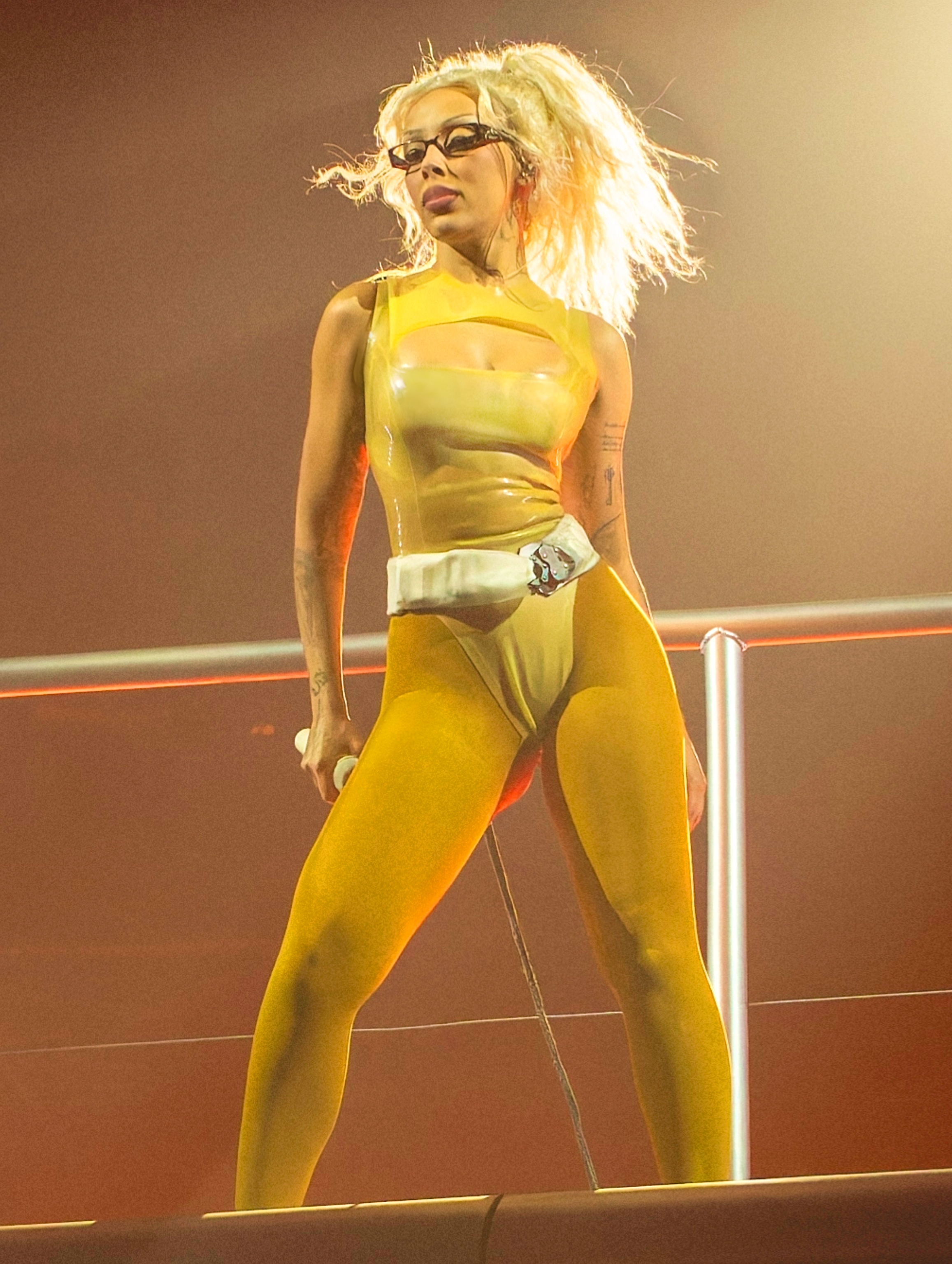
Doja Cat performing in 2024

On April 5, 2024, Doja Cat released Scarlet 2 Claude, a deluxe edition of Scarlet named after the Claude Frollo character from The Hunchback of Notre Dame. It features collaborations from American rappers ASAP Rocky and Teezo Touchdown. In October 2024, Doja Cat made a few posts on X (formerly Twitter) teasing a forthcoming album, such as "vvv" and "album", which led to fans thinking she was working on her fifth studio album.

In early 2025, Doja Cat with Raye featured in "Born Again" from Alter Ego, the first studio album of the Thai singer Lisa. On March 21, 2025, she was featured on the song "Just Us" with American rapper Jack Harlow. On May 5, 2025, Doja Cat surprise released "Crack", an outtake from her fourth studio album Scarlet, exclusively on her website, which was only available to download for 24 hours. She later collaborated with Marc Jacobs and previewed a snippet of the lead single "Jealous Type" in the advertisement of the campaign. She attended the Met Gala the same day, where she confirmed in an interview that the song will serve as a single from her upcoming album.

On July 21, 2025, Doja Cat posted on X that the album had been completed. In an article for V Magazine, she confirmed the album for a fall release date, and shared that it will be more "pop-driven" than her previous album, Scarlet. On August 14, she officially announced the album alongside a promotional video and shared that it would be released on September 26. The album, titled Vie, was released as scheduled, on September 26, 2025, to critical acclaim. The record, which marked a return to Doja Cat's pop roots, features an eclectic range of genres, including R&B, pop, funk, new jack swing, and hip-hop. Following "Jealous Type", "Gorgeous" was released as the second single in October. Vie debuted at number four on the US Billboard 200, earning 57,000 album-equivalent units in its first week. It became Doja's fourth top-ten album on the chart.

== Artistry ==
=== Influences ===
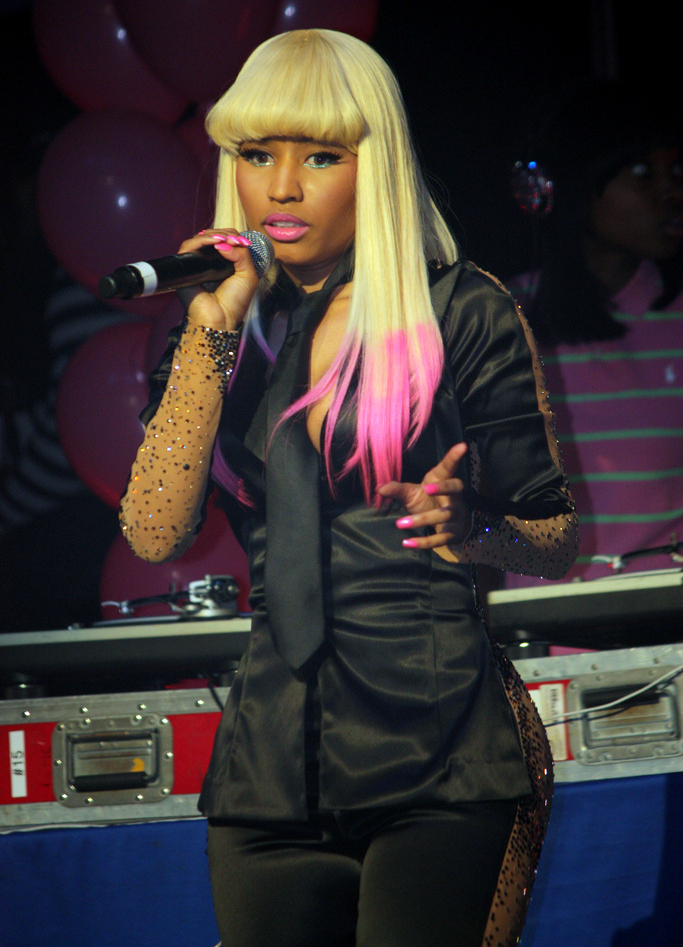
Nicki Minaj is one of Doja Cat's biggest influences.

Doja Cat has cited Nicki Minaj as one of her influences. In a Billboard interview, Doja Cat stated that she is "in love with everything Nicki Minaj has put out into the world". On the song "Get Into It (Yuh)" from her third studio album, Planet Her (2021), she pays tribute to Minaj and borrows lyrics and rap delivery from her debut 2010 single "Massive Attack". Critics noted that the album as a whole was largely influenced by Minaj, with The New Yorker noting that she "build[s] upon the pop-rap legacy established by her predecessor". She has also named Lauryn Hill and Busta Rhymes as some of her biggest influences. While speaking about Busta Rhymes, she stated: "if I hear a beat Busta Rhymes would absolutely kill, I'll use my voice to do a flow similar to his."

Additionally, Doja Cat has cited Rihanna, Beyoncé, D'Angelo, Missy Elliott, Christina Aguilera, Pharrell Williams, and Lil' Kim as major influences. She draws inspiration from her background engaging in online activities and delving into subcultures as a suburban teenager, as well as the artists her mother exposed to her as a child, such as Fugees, Erykah Badu, Jamiroquai, Earth, Wind & Fire, Black Eyed Peas, Seal, Tupac, Aaliyah, DMX, India Arie, and TLC. The Hindu culture of her childhood as well as Japanese culture have also been noted as sources of inspiration for Purrr! (2014) and other aspects of her early career. In an interview with Big Boy, she stated her admiration for Janet Jackson and Prince. In April 2026, Doja has publicly defended and expressed admiration for Madonna, specifically calling out ageist criticism against the pop legend.

=== Musical style ===
Doja Cat's music has been described as pop rap, hip-hop, pop and R&B. When asked about her legacy, Doja Cat revealed that in the future she would like to be remembered for her versatility in not only music but also visual art and dance. Her second full-length studio album, Hot Pink, is built with her own beats as well as a series of videos written and conceived by her. She claimed the era was a firm restart for her career, and the most "refined, chiseled" representation of herself. Her escapist fantasy worldview is reflected in the music by its upbeat production style. The record was inspired by drastic lifestyle changes including an "illuminating" acid trip which made her quit smoking cigarettes and marijuana.

=== Presentation ===
As a teenager in 2012, Doja Cat gained her stage name from one of her cats as well as her favorite strain of marijuana, stating, "I was heavily addicted to weed and weed culture, so when I began rapping I thought of the word 'doja' and how it sounds like a girl's name." She has since expressed slight disdain towards the name and the persona that it carries, stating in November 2021 that "my image was the pothead hippie girl, and I'm not that."

== Public image ==
Doja Cat has been noted for being versatile in her music. This includes her ability to sing, rap, and produce, as well as perform and dance. Often described as eccentric, she is known for her absurdly humorous personality and posts on social media platforms. As one of the biggest and best-performing commercial artists of the 2020s decade, writers at Billboard expressed that "it'd be tough to name three artists of any kind who feel more like the 2020s so far than Doja Cat."

Bryan Rolli of Forbes wrote that "Doja Cat's aloof, irreverent, chronically online persona masks a tireless work ethic; she sings better, raps faster and dances harder than many of her peers, all at once." In an article for Okayplayer, Robyn Mowatt noted that "as a singer, rapper, songwriter, and entertainer Doja has led her fans on a rambunctious journey equipped with snappy lyrics, live video streams, outlandish outfits, and memorable viral moments. It's not just the music that gets her fans riled up, it's also her live performances which typically are infused with a touch of eccentricity."

Her extensive online presence and bold persona have at times garnered controversy. NME named her Milkshake Duck of the year in 2018 following public circulation of 2015 tweets in which she referred to other performers as "faggots". After initially defending herself, she apologized and deleted the tweets. She faced similar backlash for comments she made regarding the COVID-19 pandemic. In 2022, public criticism of Doja Cat heightened when she did not come outside to greet fans waiting at a hotel, after her scheduled performance at Asunciónico was canceled due to severe weather. Frustrated with the backlash, Doja Cat announced she was quitting the music industry. After a brief Twitter hiatus, she retracted that statement. She faced a similar fan response after a Threads post in which she said she was not obligated to say she "loves" her fans when she does not know them, which resulted in a loss of over a quarter of a million followers on Instagram. On October 6, 2023, Doja Cat posted a selfie of her wearing a t-shirt that features alt-right comedian Sam Hyde on Instagram. The picture garnered widespread online backlash and she later deleted the photo, reposting a different selfie with Hyde's image edited out of the frame.

== Personal life ==
Doja Cat is reported to be "eager to deflect interest in her personal life". She lived in a home in Beverly Hills, California, which she bought in 2021 for $2.2 million and sold in September 2022 for $2.5 million.

She was in a brief open relationship with American musician Jawny from August 2019 until separating in February 2020. Despite not having formally come out or openly stated her sexual orientation, Doja Cat has hinted at queer themes, stating that she likes "people [she] can have sex with. And you can kinda have sex with anybody."

In June 2020, Doja Cat donated $100,000 to the Justice for Breonna Taylor Fund to support Taylor's family.

Her 2021 song "Naked" contains a tongue-in-cheek sexual reference that refers to bisexuality in that she "like[s] bananas and peaches", while her 2019 single "Bottom Bitch" can also be interpreted as a metaphor for lesbian sex.

In January 2024, Doja Cat's mother, Deborah Sawyer, filed for a temporary restraining order against her son, Raman Dalithando Dlamini, who has allegedly been physically and verbally abusing both Doja Cat and their mother. Sawyer was previously granted a restraining order against her son back in 2017.

=== Health ===
During an interview with Billboard, Doja Cat revealed that she was heavily addicted to alcohol and chain smoking when growing up and considers quitting cigarettes to be "one of the biggest challenges of [her] life". She has amblyopia and has been diagnosed with borderline personality disorder; she regularly attends therapy sessions to manage the "agonizing" latter condition.

In May 2022, Doja Cat opened up about her nicotine addiction on Twitter, and revealed that she required lancing of an infected tonsil caused by vaping and intended to pursue a tonsillectomy, consequently canceling her summer festival run and her opening act slot for the Weeknd's After Hours til Dawn Tour. The next year, Doja Cat underwent a liposuction on suspicions of having lipedema. She claimed that the decision came after a "late-night epiphany" after previously suspecting that she had cellulite, stating that lipedema runs in her family.

== Discography ==
- Amala (2018)
- Hot Pink (2019)
- Planet Her (2021)
- Scarlet (2023)
- Vie (2025)

== Filmography ==
=== Television ===
Year	Title	Role	Notes
2019	Late Night with Seth Meyers	Herself	Musical guest
2019–2020	Wild 'n Out	Herself	Guest star (2 episodes)
2020	The Late Late Show with James Corden	Herself	Musical guest
2020	The Tonight Show Starring Jimmy Fallon	Herself	Musical guest (2 episodes)
2020	Jimmy Kimmel Live!	Herself	Musical guest
2020	Post Malone's Celebrity World Pong League	Herself	Guest star
2020	Dick Clark's New Year's Rockin' Eve	Herself	Television special
2021	Dave	Herself	Episode: "Somebody Date Me"
2021	2021 MTV Video Music Awards	Herself	Host
2025	Saturday Night Live	Herself	Musical guest

=== Video games ===
Year	Title	Role	Notes
2022	House Party	Herself	Expansion pack
2025	Fortnite	Herself	In-game cosmetic

== Achievements ==
Doja Cat has received many accolades throughout her career, including one Grammy Award from nineteen nominations, six Billboard Music Awards from twenty-three nominations, five American Music Awards from eleven nominations, six MTV Video Music Awards from twenty-five nominations, and eight iHeartRadio Music Awards (including six Titanium Awards for 1 billion total audience spins) from thirty-one nominations. She has been honored as Songwriter of the Year at the BMI Pop Music Awards and the BMI R&B Hip-Hop Music Awards

On January 27, 2024, Doja Cat's single "Paint the Town Red" was listed number one in the Triple J Hottest 100, making her the first female rapper and first woman of color in history to top the list.

Billboard ranked Doja Cat at number 24 on its 2025 "Top 100 Women Artists of the 21st Century" list "in just five years as a Billboard-charting hitmaker". "Paint the Town Red" is the first rap song in history to top the Billboard Global Excl. U.S chart.

Time also included her in the Time 100 list of the 100 most influential people in the world in 2023. She was one of the four covers of the year's issue.

== Tours ==
Headlining

- Amala Tour (2018–2019)
- The Scarlet Tour (2023–2024)
- Tour Ma Vie World Tour (2025–2026)

Supporting

- Theophilus London – Vibes Tour (2015)
- Lizzo – Good as Hell Tour (2017)

== See also ==
- List of Zulu people
- List of Los Angeles rappers
- List of artists who reached number one in the United States
- List of Billboard Hot 100 number ones of 2020
- List of most-streamed artists on Spotify
