= Cookie jar (disambiguation) =

A cookie jar is a jar that holds cookies.

Cookie jar may also refer to:

== Film and television ==
- Cookie Jar Group, a defunct Canadian animation studio, now an in-name only unit of Wildbrain
  - Cookie Jar Kids Network, a 2003–2011 children's programming block on FOX, MyNetworkTV, and The CW
  - Cookie Jar Toons, a 2008–2013 daily children's programming block on This TV
  - Cookie Jar TV, a 2006–2013 children's programming block on CBS
- "The Cookie Jar", a 2020 episode of Staged

== Music ==
- #Cookie Jar (EP), by Red Velvet, 2018
  - "#Cookie Jar", by Red Velvet, 2018
- "Cookie Jar" (Gym Class Heroes song), 2008
- "Cookie Jar", a song by Doja Cat from Amala, 2018
- "Cookie Jar", a song by Jack Johnson from On and On, 2003

== Other uses ==
- "Cookie Jar" (short story), a 2016 story by Stephen King
- Cookie Jar Butte, a summit in Utah, US
- The Cookie Jar Foundation, a charity based in Scotland

== See also ==
- Cookie jar accounting, an accounting practice
- "Who stole the cookie from the cookie jar?", a children's sing-along game
