= Spider Riders =

- Also known as: see list: Spider Riders: Heroes of Oracle (Note: In Japanese: スパイダーライダーズ ～オラクルの勇者たち～ (Supaidā Raidāzu Orakuru no Yūsha-tachi)) (Japanese title, season 1) Spider Riders: The Resurrected Sun (Japanese title, season 2) (Note: In Japanese: スパイダーライダーズ ～よみがえる太陽～ (Supaidā Raidāzu Yomigaeru Taiyō))
- Genre: Mecha
- Created by: Tedd Anasti; Patsy Cameron-Anasti
- Written by: Shelley Hoffman; Robert Pincombe; Yosuke Kuroda; Hideki Shirane; Noboru Kimura
- Directed by: Koichi Mashimo; Takaaki Ishiyama; Hiroshi Morikoa; Naoyuki Kuzuya; Shintaro Itoga; Tomoyuki Kurokawa; Yuuki Arie; Yutaka Hirata; Tomoaki Ohta; Yukio Kuroda; Yutaka Hirata
- Opening theme: see Music
- Ending theme: see Music
- Countries of origin: Canada; Japan
- Original languages: English; Japanese
- No. of seasons: 2
- No. of episodes: 52 (list of episodes)

Production
- Executive producers: Lesley Taylor; Michael Hirsh; Patsy Cameron; Tedd Anasti; Kouji Kumode; Yasuharu Iwakiri
- Producer: Stephen Hodgins
- Running time: 22 minutes approx.
- Production companies: Cookie Jar Entertainment (Note: Produced under the Coliseum brand name (a former Cookie Jar Entertainment brand for action-adventure shows)); Bee Train; Yomiko Advertising; P.A. Works (season 1)

Original release
- Network: Teletoon (Canada); TV Tokyo/Kids Station (Japan)
- Release: March 25, 2006 – April 29, 2007

Spider Riders is a series of science fiction novels first published in December 2004, published by Newmarket Press written by Tedd Anasti, Patsy Cameron-Anasti and Stephen D. Sullivan (books 2–3). The series was adapted into an anime series, produced by Bee Train and Cookie Jar Entertainment. It was the first show from the latter company that was placed under the control of their then-new action-adventure brand Coliseum.

The three novels for the series included Shards of the Oracle, Reign of the Soul Eater and Quest of the Earthen. The series was broadcast on Teletoon, This TV, and used to be broadcast on Kids' WB. Koichi Mashimo co-directed the staff at Bee Train with Takaaki Ishiyama. Writer Yosuke Kuroda adapted the novels. Robert Pincombe and Shelly Hoffman wrote the English version.

== Plot ==
Eleven-year-old Hunter Steele searches for the legendary inner world by following instructions in his grandfather's journal. He enters a pyramid where he finds a mysterious manacle that attaches to his arm. A spider startles Hunter, who falls into a hole to the center of the Earth and into the subterranean world of Arachna. There, he discovers a small group of elite warriors struggling to survive and to save Arachna from the attack of Invectids, a race of insectoids. The warriors are children/teenagers, each fighting with the help of their own 10 ft (3.0 m) battle spiders. They call themselves "Spider Riders". In the English TV series, the ages of the characters were reduced. There is a prophecy that says a surface-dweller or Human, like Hunter, will bring disaster to the Inner World. Sparkle mentions it at the beginning of the TV series. When Princess Sparkle finds out she says, "I wonder if he will bring doom to us...or to them."

=== Oracle Keys ===
The Oracle Keys are fractions of the Oracle's power. They are cards that can be split in two. The Invectids hope to gain them for Mantid, who wants to use their power to rule Arachna. The Oracle uses much of her strength to protect them. The Spirit Oracle Key passes its power onto Hunter and Shadow, giving them new armor and weapons as well as new abilities.

To activate the keys, the holder must shout "Oracle's Light!". Two in combination can create more powerful armor and weapons. The wielder must have a sincere desire to protect without arrogance, otherwise the keys will malfunction. The Oracle Key from Nuuma was called by Corona, using her power, to let Hunter use it without having to hold it. Mantid used two of the Oracle's keys to power himself, plunging the Inner World into darkness and preventing Hunter from using his own keys.

Currently, the locations of the four Oracle Keys are known in the English version:

1. Found in the Oracle's shrine in Arachna, the first key is taken by Hunter and Shadow, who retain possession of it throughout the series.
2. The second key is brought to Arachna by a page from Nuuma. Hunter and Shadow have it in their possession for most of the series, though it was briefly taken by Aqune and Portia.
3. The third key is initially kept in a sanctuary in Nuuma and allows the castle to float in the sky via the Oracle's power. It is taken by Aqune for the Invectids, but ends up in the possession of Hunter and Shadow during the final battle against Mantid.
4. The fourth key held by Mantid powers Castle Mantid and sustains Mantid throughout the series until he steals the Oracle's power and abandons it. It ends up in the possession of Hunter and Shadow during the final battle against Mantid.

== Episodes ==
Season	Episodes	Originally released	
Season	Episodes	First released	Last released
1	26	March 25, 2006	October 15, 2006
2	26	October 22, 2006	April 29, 2007

== Broadcast history ==
The animated series was unveiled at L.A. Screenings in May 2005 as a 52-episode Canada-Japan co-production between Cookie Jar Entertainment, Bee Train and Yomiko Advertising. The first three episodes debuted as a 90-minute special on March 25, 2006, on Teletoon in Canada. It began its regular broadcast on May 14, with the finale airing on April 29, 2007. Reruns remained on the channel until August 26, 2012. The series also aired in French on Télétoon. In the United States, Spider Riders launched on June 17, 2006, through the Kids' WB programming block on The WB. The first 11 episodes aired before it was removed from the schedule. It returned to the network after The CW rebrand on January 20, 2007. Episode 20 would mark its final broadcast on March 31, 2007. From November 2008 until September 2011, it was shown in its entirety multiple times on the Cookie Jar Toons block on This TV. In the United Kingdom, the series began airing on Kix! on June 12, 2008.

In Japan, the first 26 episodes aired as Spider Riders: Heroes of the Oracle (スパイダーライダーズ 〜オラクルの勇者たち〜, Supaidā Raidāzu 〜 Orakuru no Yūsha-tachi 〜) on TV Tokyo and other TX Network stations from April 5 to September 27, 2006. Reruns began airing on Kids Station on October 7, 2006. The channel premiered the last 26 episodes as Spider Riders: The Resurrected Sun (スパイダーライダ〜よみがえる太陽〜, Supaidā Raidāzu Yomigaeru Taiyō) between April 14 and October 13, 2007.

== Music ==
The music depends on where Spider Riders was aired. In Japan, there were different opening songs for each season, along with two ending themes in season one and one ending theme in season 2. There is only one opening and ending theme in North America, and a Spanish version of the same theme for South America.

=== Japan ===
- Opening Theme #1: "Alright" (eps. 1-26)
- Opening Theme #2: "Brave Heart" by Saeko Chiba (eps. 27–52)
- Ending Theme #1: "Twilight Time" by MCU (eps. 1–13)
- Ending Theme #2: "Koi no Keshiki" by Tamaru Yamada (eps. 14–26)
- Ending Theme #3: "Towards a Dream" by Takashi Kondo and Sanae Kobayashi (eps. 27–52)

=== North America ===
- Opening Theme: "Calling All Spider Riders" Theme song words and music by Grayson Matthews Audio (Elizabeth Taylor, David Borbara, Tom Westin, Jason Gleed); performed by Jason Gleed, Jason Dantes Balde "Clip", and Annelise Noronha.

== Crew ==
=== English crew ===
- David Shaw - Music Score
- Melodie Vaughan - Voice Director

== Reception ==
Common Sense Media rated the show 3 out of 5 stars.

== Web manga ==
On May 31, 2006, the Spider Riders manga premiered on TV Tokyo's ani.tv website, illustrated by Junji Ohno of Studio 23. The seventh and final chapter was published between November 29 and December 27, 2006. Previous chapters were removed on November 29, 2006. Starting on December 19, 2006, the manga began serialization physically through the Monthly Fang Comic magazine, as well as online through its website on December 27. Two more chapters of the manga were later released. The web comic was published as a tankōbon on June 19, 2007, by the Monthly Fang Comic publisher LEED Publishing Co., Ltd.; the online chapters were removed soon after. Currently, the manga is not available.

The web manga has an alternate beginning, where Hunter Steele enters a spider-shaped monument and discovers the manacle floating above a spider web. Hunter wears the manacle when it flies to his hand and falls into Inner World through a gap between web strings. Inside the Inner World, Hunter discovers Shadow after peeking at the bathing Corona and after trying to rescue a cart of caged humans. Each chapter of the web manga ends with the Sparkling Sparkle section, following the adventures of Princess Sparkle and Hortala in a 4-square manga format.

In the Boy's Fang manga version, certain scenes are re-edited; for example, Corona is now naked instead of in underwear when Hunter first met her in chapter 1, an illustration is added at the beginning of each chapter, and Sparkling Sparkle segments have been removed.

== Merchandise ==
Mattel acquired the master toy license in June 2006, but would ultimately not release any products tied to the series.

=== Home video ===
In the United States, Funimation announced they had acquired the home video rights to the show in June 2006. In June 2007, Vivendi Visual Entertainment Canada agreed to release several Cookie Jar productions, including Spider Riders. Funimation released a single English-only volume on DVD with the first seven episodes in September 2007, which Vivendi also distributed in Canada. Vivendi would later release volumes 2-5 (encompassing the first thirty-five episodes) exclusively in Canada between January and December 2009. The company also published a concurrent French release.

In Japan, BMG released the first twenty-six episodes across 7 DVDs in a boxset on July 25, 2007. Between that date and September 26 the company distributed the same discs for the rental market. The last twenty-six episodes followed in a similar set on December 19. Its rental release occurred between then and February 20, 2008.

=== Video games ===
In Japan, TV Tokyo's Anime X service published Spider Catcher and Oracle Daifugo, two downloadable games based on the show for the FOMA-enabled cell phones on July 29, 2006. A third game, Jumping Spider, was released on August 9, 2006. Each game costs 105 yen.

In western markets, Tribal Nova and Frima Studio produced a tie-in online game based on the show, called Spider Riders: Battle for Arachna, which launched on the official website in May 2007.
