= Say So =

2020 single by Doja Cat

Single by Doja Cat

from the album Hot Pink
- Released: January 17, 2020
- Recorded: July 2019
- Genre: Bubblegum pop; nu-disco; pop rap
- Length: 3:58 (original version); 3:26 (Nicki Minaj remix)
- Label: Kemosabe; RCA
- Songwriters: Amala Dlamini; Lukasz Gottwald; Lydia Asrat; Jamie Parker; David Sprecher; Onika Maraj (remix)
- Producer: Tyson Trax

Doja Cat singles chronology
"Cyber Sex" (2019)	"Say So" (2020)	"Boss Bitch" (2020)

Nicki Minaj singles chronology
"Nice to Meet Ya" (2020)	"Say So" (remix) (2020)	"Trollz" (2020)

Lyric video
- "Say So" (remix) on YouTube

"Say So" is a song by American rapper and singer Doja Cat from her second studio album, Hot Pink (2019). The song was written by Doja Cat with her manager Lydia Asrat, Jamie Parker, Yeti Beats, and Dr. Luke, who handled production for the song under the pseudonym Tyson Trax. Originally an album track, the song was serviced by Kemosabe and RCA Records in January 2020 as the record's fifth single after it gained traction on TikTok, where a dance set to the song went viral. A pop song, it features elements of 1970s funk, disco, and pop rap. Directed by Hannah Lux Davis, the music video earned praise for its matching retro 1970s aesthetic. In both the video and the song's lyrics, Doja Cat explores flirting and invites a stranger with whom she feels a connection to come over and talk to her. "Say So" is widely considered to be Doja Cat's signature track.

The solo version of "Say So" initially peaked at number 5 on the US Billboard Hot 100, before two remixes featuring fellow rapper Nicki Minaj propelled the song to number 1. With this, the track earned both artists their first number 1 song in the US. Elsewhere, the song also reached number 1 in Croatia and the top ten in 24 additional countries including the United Kingdom, Canada, Australia, Ireland and New Zealand, becoming Doja Cat's first mainstream hit and her pop radio breakthrough. It has received several certifications, including a septuple platinum from the Recording Industry Association of America (RIAA), an eightfold platinum from the Australian Recording Industry Association (ARIA), and diamonds in France and Mexico.

To promote "Say So", Doja Cat performed the song on many television programs and awards shows, including the 2020 MTV Video Music Awards, the 2020 Billboard Music Awards, and the 63rd Annual Grammy Awards, where the song was nominated in two categories: Record of the Year and Best Pop Solo Performance. The song and its music video appeared on several year-end lists, as well as Billboard's list of the Best Pop Songs of All Time, although many critics were polarized by its success and described it as a comeback for its producer and co-writer Dr. Luke, following the 2014 Kesha v. Dr. Luke lawsuits.

== Background ==
=== Recording and release ===
"Say So" was written by Doja Cat and her manager Lydia Asrat, as well as Dr. Luke, who handled production for the song under the pseudonym Tyson Trax. Frequent collaborator Yeti Beats also served as an executive producer and co-writer. "Say So" is one of eight songs co-written by Asrat on the parent album, Hot Pink, and is one of five produced by Trax. A&R executives at RCA Records said that they "immediately" knew the song had hit potential, with Keith Naftaly stating: "A retro disco-pop song with sweet vocals and flirtatious lyrics? …That song right there is gonna make you a global pop star." On the creative process of the song, Doja Cat said that the melody came about before the lyrics and that she was "noodling around" at her mother's home when it started coming together.

When I got that beat I went home and I locked myself in my room, and I was like: "Let me just open this up on Logic." I opened it up, I thought, I mumbled it, that's how I began, and it just fell together really nicely, lyrically I feel like. [...] I naturally write 70's kind of more vintage-y, funk-y music. I feel like that's kind of my bag and I love it so much. It's really fun to make.

— Doja Cat on the inception of "Say So" in an interview with MTV.

The song was originally included as an album track on Doja Cat's second studio album Hot Pink (2019). During late 2019 and early 2020, it gained popularity "out of nowhere" on TikTok due to a viral dance challenge which featured the song and was created by TikTok user Haley Sharpe (@yodelinghaley). Celebrities such as Dua Lipa, Laura Dern, Charli D'Amelio, Mackenzie Ziegler, and Sofia Wylie posted their own videos of themselves performing the dance, ultimately helping it become "a go-to challenge for TikTok users". "Say So" would later end up becoming the fifth most-used song on TikTok throughout the year 2020. As a result of its initial traction, the song officially impacted contemporary hit radio on January 28, 2020, rhythmic contemporary radio on February 4, and hot adult contemporary radio on March 23, in the United States. Despite being the fifth single from the record, "Say So" was only the second single to be promoted to radio.

=== Remix ===
Doja Cat announced a remix of the song featuring Nicki Minaj a day before its release on May 1, 2020. Tunji Balogun, an A&R executive at RCA Records, organised her feature on this remix. Having expressed her admiration for Minaj, Doja Cat has said that the pairing for the remix came naturally. The release of the track was received by fans as the end of a supposed feud between the two rappers, which Doja Cat later simply deemed a misunderstanding. Following rumors of the collaboration preceding its official announcement, the original version of the remix leaked online. Minaj later said that this leaked version was an earlier demo of the remix and that the officially released version was the "correct, updated" one. Due to high demand by fans online, the leaked version was later officially released on May 8, 2020. While no official music video was made for the Nicki Minaj version, a dance visual featuring three performers was posted to Minaj's official YouTube channel on May 2, 2020.

Minaj performs an additional verse in the outro of the song in which she raps the lyric: "Why you talkin' 'bout who body fake? / With all them fillers in your face, you just full of hate". Following major speculation, the rapper disclosed that the verse was not directed at television personality Wendy Williams. However fans continued to speculate that the verse was directed at Beyoncé, which Minaj later denied. During a Twitter Q&A on May 8, 2020, as part of #SaySoRMXParty, Minaj first sparked rumors of her potential pregnancy with her husband Kenneth Petty, before formally announcing that she was pregnant with her first child only two months later.

=== Mixing ===
American recording engineer Clint Gibbs, Dr. Luke's chief engineer and occasional mixer under the latter's publishing company Prescription Songs, used Pro Tools to mix both the solo and Nicki Minaj versions of "Say So". Gibbs aimed at recreating the chorus guitar sound used by American musician Nile Rodgers from the R&B band Chic. He revealed that the Minaj remix came together "very last minute," and that her vocal engineer, Aubry "Big Juice" Delaine, sent him her vocals before the record label even told Gibbs that the remix was taking place. While mixing, he would constantly be getting newer and updated versions of Minaj's vocals, and revealed that on "the day before the remix was supposed to come out, someone wanted to change the beat underneath her vocals. All of a sudden there was an emergency!". Tyson Trax (Dr. Luke) sent Gibbs the newer instrumental for Minaj's part, and he had only an hour to mix it before its release only a few hours later. His final rough mix included nearly 100 tracks.

=== Dr. Luke controversy ===
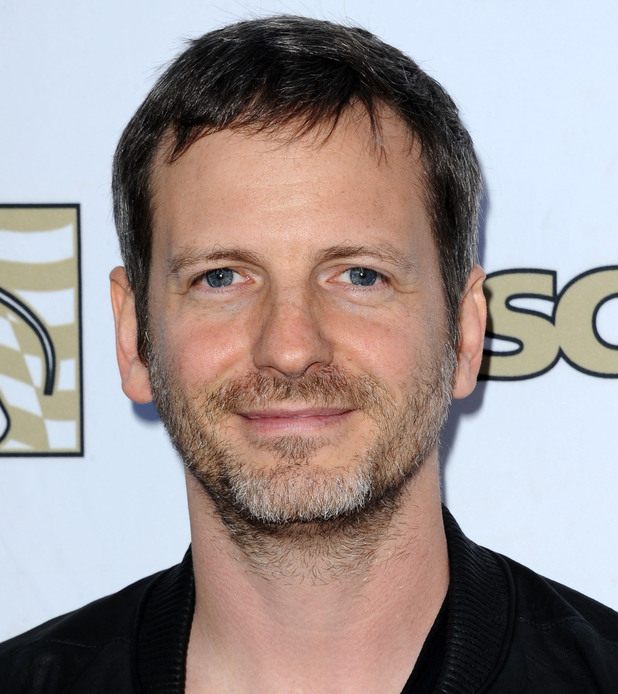
Dr. Luke co-wrote the song and produced it under the pseudonym Tyson Trax.

The song's eventual commercial success saw several music critics disturbed by what they described as the "comeback" of Dr. Luke, following the series of lawsuits filed against him by singer Kesha in 2014. Despite the fact that Doja Cat does not disclose the details of their relationship, she has previously liked tweets pointing out that she had signed with Dr. Luke before the lawsuits were issued. Dr. Luke's multiple Grammy Award nominations for the song using a pseudonym faced further criticism from singer Fiona Apple, who called for the boycott of the award ceremony entirely.

A number of writers from American music magazine Billboard shared their opinions on the matter. Andrew Unterberger described the song as one of "the year's best floor-fillers," but highlighted that "[it's Dr. Luke] who Doja's sharing the floor with on 'Say So', an uncomfortable fact that shouldn't be ignored." Denise Warner argued, "how does one support the success of 'Say So' without marginalizing Kesha's accusations or story?" Gab Ginsberg stated, "If Doja has her own reasons for wanting to work with Luke, I don't have to like it, but that's her deal. I do wish there was a way to support Doja and not Luke, but the fact is he helped her make a hit, and I do enjoy it," while Unterberger opined, "it's something we have to keep reminding ourselves and each other about—and to continue to ask Doja and other present and future collaborators about—to make sure that everyone stays informed about [Lukasz] Gottwald's resumed presence in pop's mainstream, and can respond and demand general accountability accordingly."

== Composition and lyrics ==
"Say So"
A 25-second audio sample of the song's second chorus and the first part of Doja Cat's rap verse

"Say So" is a pop rap, and disco song. It features elements of 1970s funk, and bubblegum pop. The song is composed in 4/4 time and in the key of D major, with a moderately fast tempo of 111 beats per minute (BPM) and a ii–V–I (two-five-one) chord progression of Em^{7}–A^{7}–Dmaj^{7}. Doja Cat's vocals on the track span between the low note of F♯_{3} and the high note of D_{5}, giving the song one octave and eight tones of vocal range. The song is built around a "retro", "grooving" funk guitar riff, an "iridescent" synthesizer, syncopated handclaps, "groovy" 808s, and a funk-inspired walking bassline. It is characterized by Doja Cat's floaty vocals and her rich, breathy harmonies. Writing for Clash, Erin Bashford noted that the song "nods to the funk and grooves of the '70s with a modernised almost-house beat, all tied together with Doja's always perfect vocal performance". One critic wrote that its "psychedelic-rock vibe" complemented both her singing and rapping, while another wrote that Doja Cat's "playful" delivery helps keep TikTok dancers on rhythm despite the absence of a conventional bass-heavy beat.

Lyrically, the song is about flirting and "swapping gazes" with a person with whom you feel a connection. On its origins, Doja Cat told MTV, "It's about when you go somewhere and you see someone and they don't approach you, but you're looking at each other and you both feel like there's something there." Following the second chorus, Doja Cat breaks into a "steamy", "swaggering" rap verse and notably asks the person to admit their feelings to her and not to "beat around the bush". On her remix, Nicki Minaj adds a "slick", "high-energy" and "playful" rap verse, while Doja Cat adds "sexy" background vocals. Minaj makes a number of references to Naomi Campbell, Cassie, and Lauryn Hill by means of name-dropping, while also alluding to the COVID-19 pandemic which was ongoing as she recorded her verse. Produced by Dr. Luke, the instrumental is nearly identical to the original with additional 808s and a mix in the note progression for Minaj's part, ultimately "turning the song's disco pulse into a spitting trap beat". Minaj is credited as an additional co-writer on the remix.

== Critical reception ==
=== Solo version ===
Writing for Rolling Stone, Jon Dolan described "Say So" as "a high-gloss bit of Chic-biting retro disco, light and evanescent like the sun glistening off the ocean", while David Renshaw of The Fader deemed it "a slinky ode to seizing romance in the moment". Nerisha Penrose of Elle noted that the song "offers a healthy dose of nostalgia as Doja's hushed, airy voice floats over a bed of iridescent synths and a funky bassline". In a review for Clash, Erin Bashford wrote that the song is "tied together with Doja's always perfect vocal performance". Writers at CBC Music noted that by "switching between saccharine songbird and hard-hitting rapper, Doja Cat flexes her musical chops alongside a retro guitar riff tailor made for a '70s nightclub."

Rachel Epstein of Marie Claire drew comparisons between "Say So" and the works of American pop singer Gwen Stefani, while Heran Mamo of Billboard noted the resemblance between Gibbs' engineered chorus guitar sound on "Say So" and Nile Rodgers' guitarwork in the 1979 single "Good Times" by Chic. Writing for Rolling Stone, Rob Sheffield also compared the song to the works of British new wave bands such as Kajagoogoo, Naked Eyes and Spandau Ballet. Justin Curto of Vulture deemed the song "an undeniable throwback" and praised both its "grooving guitars" as well as Doja Cat's "breathy vocals that recall early Donna Summer". Mamo described the song an "effortless dance floor-filler", while Lucy Shanker of Consequence called it a "traditional pop hit" in her review of Hot Pink. While reflecting on the music of 2020, Ben Beaumont-Thomas of The Guardian wrote that "Say So" was "rightly a pop-cultural phenomenon, though Dr. Luke's involvement in it will be controversial". Billboard and HotNewHipHop have both cited "Say So" as Doja Cat's signature track.

=== Remix ===
Althea Legapsi of Rolling Stone described the "retro-grooving pop song" as "sassy", while in the same publication, Jon Dolan noted that Minaj provided "a welcome dose of zip" to the song. Jackson Langford of NME praised her addition to the track, writing that "Minaj's high-energy verses bookend the remix". Writing for Complex, Jessica McKinney noted that Minaj "adds more of a contemporary feel" to the song. Following its chart placement, McKinney described the remix as "special" since it "successfully disrupted a male-dominated industry, as two women sat together at the top of the charts." Similarly, Aaron Williams of Uproxx wrote that the song opened "the floodgates [...] for long-thwarted female rappers to traipse right up to the top of the Hot 100." In a more negative review, Chris Molanphy of Slate wrote that Minaj's "deftly delivered boasts feel about as organically integrated into the track as a Post-it note".

=== Year-end lists ===
Critical rankings for "Say So"
Publication	Accolade	Version	Rank	Ref.
Apple Music	The 100 Best Songs of 2020	Solo version	11	
Billboard	The 100 Best Songs of 2020	Solo version	6	
Billboard	The 500 Best Pop Songs of All Time	Solo version	173	
Complex	The Best Songs of 2020	Nicki Minaj remix	47	
Crack Magazine	The Top 10 Music Videos of 2020	Music video	placed	
Elite Daily	The 10 Most Jaw-Dropping Music Videos Of 2020	Music video	7	
The Fader	The 100 best songs of 2020	Solo version	44	
The Guardian	Lanre Bakare's Best Tracks of 2020	Solo version	placed	
Insider	The 45 best music videos of 2020	Music video	29	
Nylon	The 10 Best Music Videos of 2020	Music video	placed	
Rolling Stone	The 50 Best Songs of 2020	Nicki Minaj remix	43	
Rolling Stone	Rob Sheffield's Top 25 Songs of 2020	Nicki Minaj remix	22	
Slate	The Best Songs of 2020	Solo version	15	
Stereogum	The Top 40 Pop Songs Of 2020	Solo version	32	
Uproxx	The 50 Best Songs Of 2020	Solo version	7	
Vulture	The Best Dance and Disco Songs of 2020	Solo version	placed	
XXL	The 50 Best Hip-Hop Songs of 2020	Nicki Minaj remix	placed	

== Commercial performance ==
In the United States, the solo version of "Say So" initially entered Billboard's Bubbling Under Hot 100 at number 19 on the chart issue dated January 4, 2020, before moving up to number 6 the following week. After two weeks, "Say So" earned Doja Cat her third Hot 100 entry, debuting at number 95 on the chart dated January 18, 2020. While gaining traction over the following weeks, it entered Billboard's Mainstream Top 40 (Pop Airplay) chart at number 33 and later spent six weeks at number 1 on this chart. Following the release of its music video, "Say So" ascended 18 positions to number 33 on the Hot 100 in its eighth-week charting. "Say So" simultaneously earned Doja Cat her first top-five song on both the Hot 100 and Radio Songs charts, as well as her first top 10 on the Streaming Songs chart. The song also reached number 1 on both Billboard's Rhythmic and Dance/Mix Show Airplay charts in the weeks dated April 18 and 25 respectively. The track would eventually be considered Doja Cat's pop radio breakthrough. With approximately two billion audience impressions, "Say So" ranked as the tenth most popular radio song in the US in 2020. iHeartRadio revealed that "Say So" had also achieved over 1.17 billion total audience spins on their platform in 2020.

Following the release of the remix featuring Nicki Minaj, "Say So" moved from number 6 to number 1 on the Hot 100 chart dated May 16, 2020. The song became the first collaboration between two female rappers to top the Hot 100. It also marked the first number 1 song on the Hot 100 chart for both Doja Cat and Minaj. That same week, "Savage Remix" by Megan Thee Stallion and Beyoncé reached number 2 on the Hot 100 as well, making history becoming the first time that four black female solo artists occupied the top two spots on the Hot 100 chart. The last time multiple black female artists occupied the number 1 and number 2 spots was in 2009, when "Single Ladies (Put a Ring on It)" by Beyoncé occupied number 1 and the Rihanna featuring "Live Your Life" by T.I. took number 2.

Additionally, the song rose to number 1 on the Hot R&B/Hip-Hop Songs and on the Hot R&B Songs charts, giving Doja Cat her first number 1 on each chart and giving Minaj her fifth and first, respectively. Minaj was officially credited as a featured artist on the song as her remix contributed to a majority of the chart points that surged the song to the top, supported by a variety of bundles and videos, which also helped the song top the Digital Songs Sales chart, with a 966 percent increase in sales to 66,000 downloads sold. On the Streaming Songs chart, the song rose from number 10 to number 4 with an 87 per cent increase. However, after charting for two weeks as a featured artist, Billboard removed Minaj's credit since the chart issue dated May 30, 2020, with Doja Cat charting unaccompanied again. Approximately 90 percent of the song's radio airplay was for the original solo version, therefore Minaj was not credited as an artist on any airplay charts at all.

"Say So" became Doja Cat's first proper mainstream hit, and her second internationally charting single after "Candy" had reached modest peaks in Australia, Ireland, Canada and Greece in late 2019. In the United Kingdom, "Say So" debuted at number 83 on the UK Singles Chart on the issue dated January 3, 2020. It gradually ascended to number 10 on the chart dated May 1, 2020, before the Nicki Minaj remix helped propel it to a peak of number 2 the following week, when it was beaten to the top of the chart by "Toosie Slide" by Drake. In Canada, "Say So" peaked at number 3 and additionally topped the Canada CHR/Top 40 chart. It peaked in the top ten in two dozen other national single charts including Australia's ARIA Singles Chart (No. 4), the Irish Singles Chart (No. 4), New Zealand's RMNZ Top 40 Singles chart (No. 3), the French Singles Chart (No. 9), the Netherlands' Dutch Single Top 100 chart, Portugal's AFP Top 100 Singles Chart (No. 8), and both Belgium's Flemish and Walloon Ultratop charts (No. 5).

In the United States, "Say So" became Doja Cat's first track to be certified both platinum and multi-platinum by the Recording Industry Association of America (RIAA), in April 2020 and August 2020, respectively. According to MRC Data's 2020 year-end report, "Say So" was the tenth most streamed song in the US, with 562.4 million on-demand streams. It also was the second-most successful R&B song in the US in 2020 (behind "Blinding Lights" by the Weeknd), and had the most viewed R&B music video of the year worldwide. The song has been certified eightfold platinum in Australia by the Australian Recording Industry Association (ARIA) for track-equivalent sales of 560,000 units. The British Phonographic Industry has certified the song double platinum in the United Kingdom for the track-equivalent sales of 1,200,000 units. In Brazil, it is certified triple-diamond by Pro-Música Brasil for the track-equivalent sales of 480,000 units. Elsewhere, "Say So" has been certified diamond in France and Mexico, eightfold platinum in Canada, quadruple-platinum in New Zealand, triple-platinum in Poland, and platinum in Norway, Belgium, and Switzerland among other territories.

== Music video ==
=== Background and release ===
The music video for "Say So" was filmed during the basis of January 23–24, 2020 and was later released on February 27, 2020, when it premiering alongside a live performance of the song on The Tonight Show Starring Jimmy Fallon. Doja Cat had announced its release on social media the day before, writing, "You bitches wanted it, now you'll have it. Say So video tomorrow at 10AM ET." The video was directed by Hannah Lux Davis and stars actor Josué de La Vega as Tony, Doja Cat's love interest. It was filmed at the Sheats–Goldstein Residence in Beverly Crest, Los Angeles, and features cameo appearances from TikTok stars Donté Colley and Haley Sharpe, the latter of whom created the viral dance for the song. The dance itself, which made the song popular, was featured in the music video. Sharpe revealed that she was in art class on a Tuesday when she got an email notification with the subject "Say So music video inquiry", and that she arrived at the video shoot on the Friday of that same week. She said that, during the shoot, Doja Cat had expressed her gratitude towards Sharpe for creating the dance.

=== Synopsis and reception ===
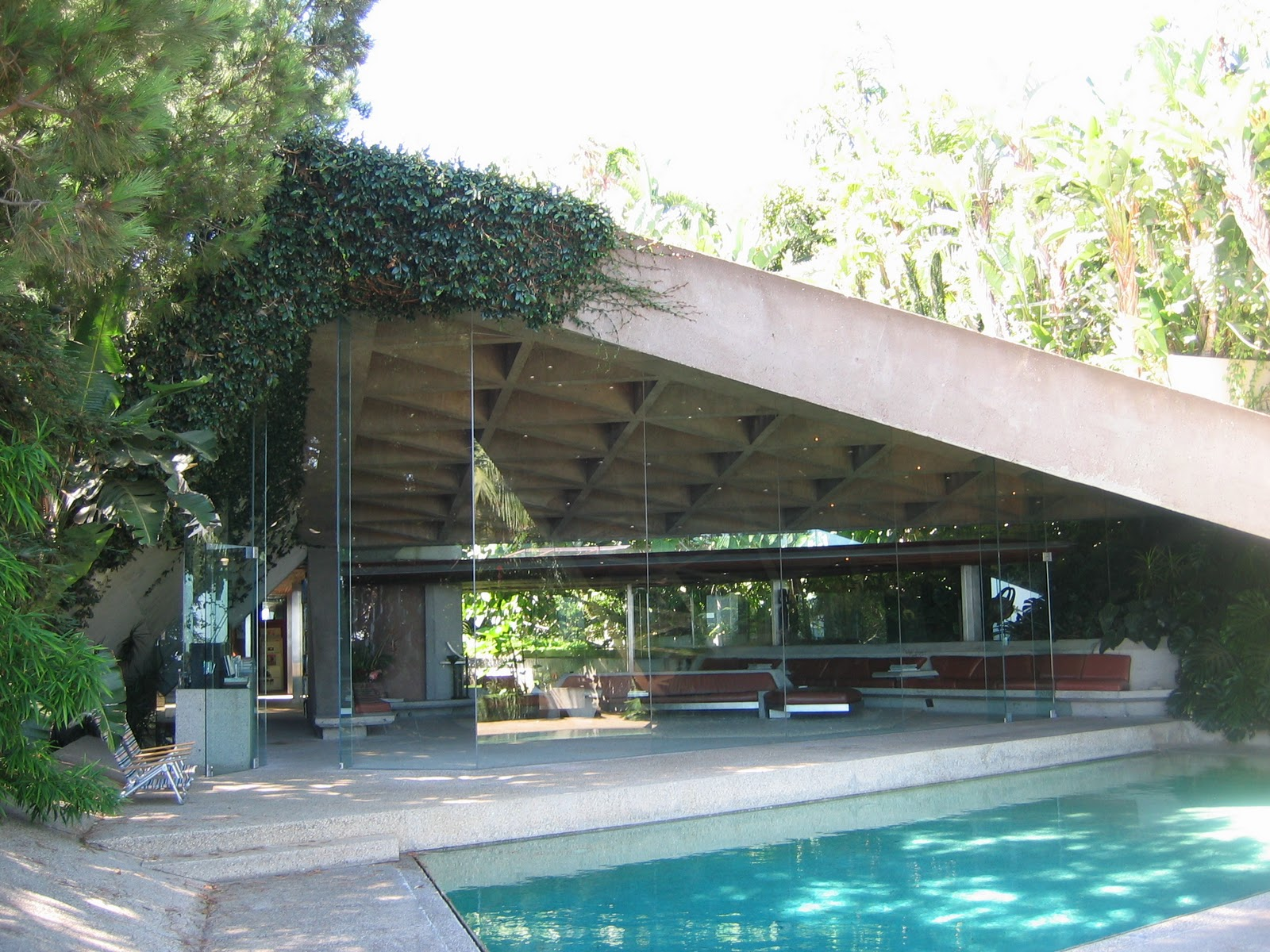
Doja Cat dances with friends by this poolside at the Sheats–Goldstein Residence in Los Angeles, before attending a disco inside the mansion.

Several publications praised the music video for its 1970s disco theme, with some calling it "groovy", "psychedelic", and "vibrant". Others pointed out its "golden-hued" aesthetic and filming style inspired by Super 8 film, and noted that its 4x3 resolution made it look like an authentic "vintage movie". Doja Cat appears in a total of four different outfits which each were described as "shimmery", "sparkly", "sequinned", and "glamorous". During the day, she flirts with a "handsome handyman" who fixes her record player at the mansion. The video alternates between this scene and one where she dances in front of the Los Angeles skyline in a full-length dress with rhinestones, which Margaret Blatz of Elite Daily compared to Marilyn Monroe's gown from her 1962 performance of "Happy Birthday, Mr. President". Here, she also sports aqua-coloured eyeshadow and a blowout which one writer compared to those commonly worn by American actress Farrah Fawcett. Later that night Doja Cat challenges the handyman to a dance battle amongst a crowd of others at a disco in the same mansion. In this scene, her outfit consists of a large blonde afro wig, glitter eyeshadow and a sequin-filled jumpsuit that resembles a disco-ball. Between the indoor daytime scene and the disco scene, Doja Cat has "a quick poolside groove session with her friends" just outside the mansion, where she wears a purple headpiece and long blonde hair extensions. Upon her arrival at the disco, Doja Cat can be seen using a leash to walk a real-life tiger named Schicka. Writing for Teen Vogue, Allie Gemmill pointed out her familiarity with Doja Cat's "dynamic, playful" music videos, but noted that this one "might just be the best one yet".

== Accolades ==
Awards and nominations for "Say So" (Solo version)
Ceremony	Year	Award	Result	Ref.
American Music Awards	2020	Favorite Music Video	Nominated	
BET Awards	2020	Video of the Year	Nominated	
BMI Pop Awards	2021	Award-Winning Songs	Won	
BMI R&B/Hip-Hop Awards	2021	Song of the Year	Won	
BMI R&B/Hip-Hop Awards	2021	Award-Winning Songs	Won	
Billboard Music Awards	2021	Top R&B Song	Nominated	
GAFFA Awards (Denmark)	2021	International Song of the Year	Nominated	
Grammy Awards	2021	Record of the Year	Nominated	
Grammy Awards	2021	Best Pop Solo Performance	Nominated	
Guinness World Records	2021	First female rap duo to reach No. 1 on the US singles chart (Note: Credited to the Nicki Minaj version.)	Won	
iHeartRadio Music Awards	2021	Favorite Music Video Choreography	Nominated	
iHeartRadio Music Awards	2021	TikTok Bop of the Year	Nominated	
MTV Video Music Awards	2020	Song of the Year	Nominated	
MTV Video Music Awards	2020	Best Direction	Nominated	
MTV Video Music Awards	2020	Song of Summer	Nominated	
MTV Video Music Awards Japan	2020	Best New International Artist Video	Won	
MTV Video Play Awards	2020	Top 10 Music Videos	Won	
NAACP Image Awards	2021	Outstanding New Artist	Won	
NRJ Music Awards	2020	Video of the Year	Nominated	
MTV Millennial Awards Brazil	2020	Global Hit	Nominated	
MTV Millennial Awards Brazil	2020	International Collaboration	Nominated	
MVPA Awards	2021	Best Pop Video	Nominated	
MVPA Awards	2021	Best Cinematography in a Video	Nominated	
MVPA Awards	2021	Best Colour Grading in a Video	Won	
RTHK International Pop Poll Awards	2021	Top Ten International Gold Songs	Won	

== Live performances ==
Shortly after the premiere of the song's music video, Doja Cat performed "Say So" on The Tonight Show Starring Jimmy Fallon on February 26, 2020. The performance features Doja Cat dressed in a baby pink bodysuit, along with two backup singer/dancers who execute disco-influenced choreography, which incorporated some of the dance moves from the viral TikTok routine. In a new artist campaign organised by MTV titled Push, Doja Cat performed "Say So" on April 4, 2020. In that same month, she performed an exclusive parody version of the song during the Nether Meant music festival, significantly changing the song's lyrics to relate to the video game Minecraft (2011). A live performance of "Say So" was uploaded to YouTube in May 2020 as part of Vevo's 2020 Lift campaign for new artists. The video features Doja Cat in a box-like structure room with pink carpeted walls as she performs the song in a one-piece fur outfit with cat ears to match. On May 11, 2020, Doja Cat performed "Say So" on The Voice, wearing a pink '70s inspired costume and positioned on top of a giant disco ball. On May 23, 2020, Doja Cat performed "Say So" at the virtual 2020 BBC Radio 1's Big Weekend music festival. Her performance of the song on The Late Late Show with James Corden on June 17, 2020, took place in a scene described as "a fluffy pink slumber party with sparkling chiffon curtains and neon signs galore".

On August 30, 2020, Doja Cat performed a medley of "Say So" and "Like That" at the 2020 MTV Video Music Awards. The performance was science fiction themed and saw her wearing a reptilian full body suit. It was also here that she first introduced the concept of her then-forthcoming third studio album Planet Her (2021). Doja Cat performed "Say So" in a Broadway-themed medley with "Juicy" and "Like That" at the 2020 Billboard Music Awards, which some writers noted to be inspired by Roxie Hart from the musical Chicago. At the 2020 MTV Europe Music Awards, Doja Cat performed a metal version of "Say So", where she re-created the scene of Samara Morgan crawling out of a television in the horror film The Ring (2002). Australian guitarist Plini accused Doja Cat of using a guitar solo lifted from his song "Handmade Cities" without permission. Regarding the alleged plagiarism, Plini stated "the lack of prior communication about it or proper credit upon release is disappointing but not particularly surprising in a sector of the industry that is usually more interested in clout than creativity. (it's being sorted now, but would have been cooler a million views ago)". On December 12, 2020, Doja Cat performed the song at the 10th Streamy Awards. Later that month, she performed it at iHeartRadio's 2020 Jingle Ball, and at the annual Dick Clark's New Year's Rockin' Eve show. At the 63rd Annual Grammy Awards in March 2021, Doja Cat performed "Say So" for what she said would be the last time, and described the performance as the "funeral of 'Say So'" in an interview.

In an interview with Rolling Stone in December 2021, while reflecting on the success of "Say So", she revealed that the COVID-19 pandemic "ruined" the relationship she had with her favorite song from Hot Pink and that having to repetitively perform it virtually instead of on a stage in front of fans "just became a very sad and repetitive and underwhelming thing".

== Cover versions ==
- A Japanese version of the song recorded by Indonesian YouTuber and singer Rainych Ran was released on March 31, 2020. The song was translated by fellow YouTuber Datenkou and mixed by Rainych herself. The cover gained the attention of Doja Cat while on an Instagram livestream after a fan suggested that she listen to it. During her reaction of the cover music video, Doja Cat called Rainych's voice "beautiful" while dancing, saying that "she's fire. She knows exactly what the fuck she's doing." Rainych expressed her happiness on Twitter multiple times, thanking the fan that suggested the song, and also writing that she was "smiling while crying" over the reaction.
- Lisa of the Korean girl group Blackpink performed "a slinky, showgirl cover" of the song as part of the group's online concert titled The Show. She added a self-written rap and self-choreographed dance break to her rendition.
- On June 23, 2020, South Korean singer Luna of the girl group f(x), released a Korean version of the song, along with an accompanying music video. The video features Luna, accompanied by two dancers, wearing a bra and bikini, and has a "flirtatious and retro vibe".
- On April 29, 2020, R&B singer PJ covered the song in a trap and R&B style for her The Quarantine Tapes campaign.

== In other media ==
A Fortnite emote featuring the song was released in September 2020. "Say So" is featured on the dance rhythm game Just Dance 2021. "Say So" would be announced as a Jam Track for Fortnite Festival on January 30, 2023, and added to the game on February 2, 2024.

== Track listing ==
Digital download / streaming – Jax Jones Midnight Snack remix

1. "Say So" (Jax Jones Midnight Snack Remix) – 3:30

Digital download / streaming – Friend Within remix

1. "Say So" (Friend Within Remix) – 2:52

Digital download / streaming – Snakehips remix

1. "Say So" (Snakehips Remix) – 3:20

12-inch single / CD single

1. "Say So" – 3:58
2. "Say So" (feat. Nicki Minaj) – 3:26

Digital download / streaming – Remix featuring Nicki Minaj

1. "Say So" (feat. Nicki Minaj) – 3:26

Digital download / streaming – Remix featuring Nicki Minaj (Original Version)

1. "Say So" (feat. Nicki Minaj) [Original Version] – 3:26

Digital download / streaming – "Say So" / "Like That" (Mashup)

1. "Say So / Like That" (Mashup) – 3:32

== Credits and personnel ==
Credits adapted from "Say So" single liner notes.

=== Solo version ===
Recording and management

- Mixed at Threejonet Studios (Los Angeles, California)
- Mastered at Bernie Grundman Mastering (Hollywood, California)
- Doja Cat Music/Prescription Songs (BMI), Kasz Money Publishing (BMI), Desta Melodies (BMI)

Personnel

- Doja Cat – vocals, songwriting
- Lukasz Gottwald – songwriting; production as Tyson Trax for Prescription Songs
- Lydia Asrat – songwriting
- Clint Gibbs – mixing
- Mike Bozzi – mastering

=== Remix ===
Recording and management

- Nicki Minaj's vocals recorded and mixed at Kingdom Recording (Beverly Hills, California)
- Mixed at Threejonet Studios (Los Angeles, California)
- Mastered at Bernie Grundman Mastering (Hollywood, California)
- Doja Cat Music/Prescription Songs (BMI), Kasz Money Publishing (BMI), Desta Melodies (BMI), Universal Music Works/Ken & Barbie Music (BMI)

Personnel

- Doja Cat – vocals, songwriting
- Lukasz Gottwald – songwriting; production (as Tyson Trax for Prescription Songs)
- Lydia Asrat – songwriting
- Onika Tanya Maraj-Petty – songwriting
- Aubry "Big Juice" Delaine – Nicki Minaj's vocals recording, Nicki Minaj's vocals mixing
- Clint Gibbs – mixing
- Mike Bozzi – mastering

== Charts ==
=== Weekly charts ===
Weekly chart performance
Chart (2020)	Peak position
Argentina Hot 100 (Billboard)	10
Australia (ARIA)	4
Austria (Ö3 Austria Top 40)	21
Belgium (Ultratop 50 Flanders)	5
Belgium Urban (Ultratop Flanders)	4
Belgium (Ultratop 50 Wallonia)	5
Brazil (Top 100 Brasil)	42
Bulgaria International (PROPHON)	6
Canada Hot 100 (Billboard)	3
Canada AC (Billboard)	21
Canada CHR/Top 40 (Billboard)	1
Canada Hot AC (Billboard)	5
CIS Airplay (TopHit)	2
Colombia (National-Report)	37
Croatia International Airplay (Top lista)	1
Czech Republic Airplay (ČNS IFPI)	96
Czech Republic Singles Digital (ČNS IFPI)	18
Denmark (Tracklisten)	9
El Salvador (Monitor Latino)	6
Estonia (Eesti Tipp-40)	5
Euro Digital Song Sales (Billboard)	4
Finland (Suomen virallinen lista)	13
France (SNEP)	9
Germany (GfK)	33
Global 200 (Billboard)	50
Greece International (IFPI)	13
Hungary (Dance Top 40)	18
Hungary (Rádiós Top 40)	7
Hungary (Single Top 40)	11
Hungary (Stream Top 40)	11
Iceland (Tónlistinn)	5
Ireland (IRMA)	4
Italy (FIMI)	45
Japan Hot Overseas (Billboard)	9
Latvia (LaIPA)	7
Lebanon Airplay (Lebanese Top 20)	4
Lithuania (AGATA)	5
Malaysia (RIM)	2
Mexico (Billboard Mexican Airplay)	1
Netherlands (Dutch Top 40)	12
Netherlands (Single Top 100)	9
New Zealand (Recorded Music NZ)	3
Norway (VG-lista)	19
Panama (Monitor Latino)	8
Poland Airplay (ZPAV)	32
Portugal (AFP)	8
Puerto Rico (Monitor Latino)	8
Romania (Airplay 100)	20
Romania Airplay (Media Forest)	8
Russia Airplay (TopHit)	3
San Marino (SMRRTV Top 50)	38
Scottish Singles Sales (Official Charts)	9
Singapore (RIAS)	4
Slovakia Airplay (ČNS IFPI)	58
Slovakia Singles Digital (ČNS IFPI)	26
Slovenia (SloTop50)	3
South Korea (Gaon)	104
Spain (Promusicae)	80
Sweden (Sverigetopplistan)	17
Switzerland (Schweizer Hitparade)	15
UK Singles (Official Charts)	2
Ukraine Airplay (TopHit)	43
US Billboard Hot 100	1
US Adult Contemporary (Billboard)	20
US Adult Pop Airplay (Billboard)	7
US Dance Club Songs (Billboard)	54
US Dance Airplay (Billboard)	1
US Hot R&B/Hip-Hop Songs (Billboard)	1
US Pop Airplay (Billboard)	1
US Rhythmic Airplay (Billboard)	1
US Rolling Stone Top 100	2

Weekly chart performance
Chart (2024)	Peak position
Moldova Airplay (TopHit)	76

=== Monthly charts ===
Monthly chart performance
Chart (2020)	Position
Paraguay (SGP)	94

=== Year-end charts ===
Year-end chart performance
Chart (2020)	Position
Australia (ARIA)	10
Belgium (Ultratop Flanders)	25
Belgium (Ultratop Wallonia)	14
Bulgaria (PROPHON)	9
Brazil Airplay (Crowley)	89
Canada (Canadian Hot 100)	8
CIS (TopHit)	21
Croatia (HRT)	16
Denmark (Tracklisten)	36
France (SNEP)	40
Hungary (Dance Top 40)	67
Hungary (Rádiós Top 40)	55
Hungary (Single Top 40)	96
Hungary (Stream Top 40)	48
Iceland (Tónlistinn)	19
Ireland (IRMA)	10
Netherlands (Dutch Top 40)	64
Netherlands (Single Top 100)	52
New Zealand (Recorded Music NZ)	12
Portugal (AFP)	31
Romania (Airplay 100)	68
Russia Airplay (TopHit)	20
Sweden (Sverigetopplistan)	59
Switzerland (Schweizer Hitparade)	56
UK Singles (OCC)	13
US Billboard Hot 100	11
US Adult Top 40 (Billboard)	20
US Dance/Mix Show Airplay (Billboard)	4
US Hot R&B/Hip-Hop Songs (Billboard)	8
US Mainstream Top 40 (Billboard)	7
US Rhythmic (Billboard)	8

Year-end chart performance
Chart (2021)	Position
CIS (TopHit)	126
Global 200 (Billboard)	128
Hungary (Rádiós Top 40)	48
Russia Airplay (TopHit)	144

== Certifications ==
Certifications
Region	Certification	Certified units/sales
Australia (ARIA)	8× Platinum	560,000^{‡}
Austria (IFPI Austria)	Platinum	30,000^{‡}
Belgium (BRMA)	Platinum	40,000^{‡}
Brazil (Pro-Música Brasil)	3× Diamond	480,000^{‡}
Canada (Music Canada)	8× Platinum	640,000^{‡}
Denmark (IFPI Danmark)	Platinum	90,000^{‡}
France (SNEP)	Diamond	333,333^{‡}
Germany (BVMI)	Gold	200,000^{‡}
Italy (FIMI)	Platinum	70,000^{‡}
Mexico (AMPROFON)	Diamond+3× Platinum+Gold	510,000^{‡}
New Zealand (RMNZ)	5× Platinum	150,000^{‡}
Norway (IFPI Norway)	Platinum	60,000^{‡}
Poland (ZPAV)	3× Platinum	60,000^{‡}
Portugal (AFP)	Platinum	10,000^{‡}
Spain (Promusicae)	Platinum	60,000^{‡}
Switzerland (IFPI Switzerland)	Platinum	20,000^{‡}
United Kingdom (BPI)	2× Platinum	1,200,000^{‡}
United States (RIAA)	7× Platinum	7,000,000^{‡}
Streaming
Sweden (GLF)	Platinum	8,000,000^{†}
^{‡} Sales+streaming figures based on certification alone.^{†} Streaming-only figures based on certification alone.

== Release history ==
Release history and formats for "Say So"
Region	Date	Format(s)	Version(s)	Label(s)	Ref.
Various	January 17, 2020	Digital download; streaming	Jax Jones Midnight Snack remix	Kemosabe; RCA	
Various	January 18, 2020	Digital download; streaming	Friend Within remix	Kemosabe; RCA	
United States	January 28, 2020	Contemporary hit radio	Original	Kemosabe; RCA	
Italy	January 31, 2020	Radio airplay	Original	Sony	
United States	February 4, 2020	Rhythmic contemporary radio	Original	Kemosabe; RCA	
United States	March 23, 2020	Hot adult contemporary radio	Original	Kemosabe; RCA	
Various	April 3, 2020	Digital download; streaming	Snakehips remix	Kemosabe; RCA	
Various	May 1, 2020	12-inch single; CD single; digital download	Original; remix featuring Nicki Minaj	Kemosabe; RCA	
Various	May 1, 2020	Digital download; streaming	Remix featuring Nicki Minaj	Kemosabe; RCA	
Canada	May 1, 2020	Contemporary hit radio	Remix featuring Nicki Minaj	Sony	
Italy	May 4, 2020	Radio airplay	Remix featuring Nicki Minaj	Sony	
Various	May 8, 2020	Digital download; streaming	Original remix featuring Nicki Minaj	Kemosabe; RCA	
Various	September 11, 2020	Digital download; streaming	"Say So" / "Like That" Mashup	Kemosabe; RCA	

== See also ==
- List of Billboard Hot 100 number-one singles of 2020
- List of Billboard Hot 100 top-ten singles in 2020
- List of Billboard number-one dance songs of 2020
- List of number-one digital songs of 2020 (U.S.)
- List of Billboard Argentina Hot 100 top-ten singles in 2020
