= Who stole the cookie from the cookie jar? =

Children's song

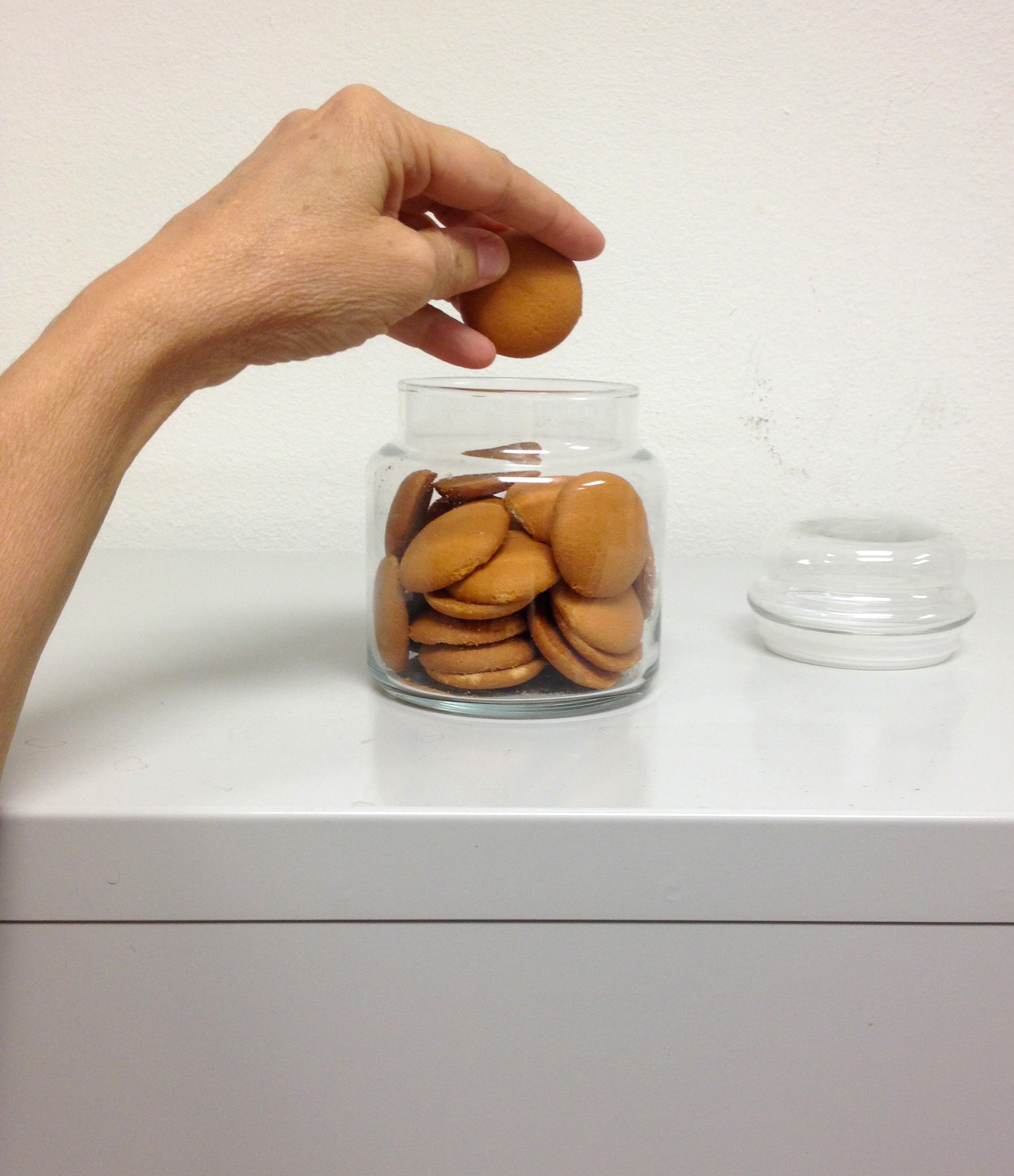
Taking a cookie from the cookie jar

"Who Stole the Cookie from the Cookie Jar?" (Also called "Who Took the Cookie from the Cookie Jar?" or the Cookie Jar Song) is a sing-along game of children's music where names are inserted into the song. The song is an infinite-loop motif, where each verse directly feeds into the next. The game begins with the players sitting or standing, arranged in an inward-facing circle.

The song usually begins with the group leader asking who stole a cookie from an imaginary (or sometimes real) cookie jar, followed by the name of one of the people in the circle. The person questions the "accusation," answered by an affirmation from the "accuser," followed by continued denial from the "accused." The accuser asks who stole the cookie, followed by the accused's saying the name of another person in the circle. The call-and-answer is potentially infinitely recursive, limited only by the number of participants or the amount of time the participants wish to spend on it.

Sometimes, a clapping or snapping beat is used by the people in the circle. Sometimes, the other participants in the group sing along with the "accuser" after the "accused" has been identified. Some variations on the theme include the use by teachers of the song as a lesson in keeping with a beat and improvisation. As with many children's songs, there can be many variations on the execution of the performance.

The song's lyrics usually start with:

Accuser/Group: Who stole/took the cookie/cookies from the cookie jar? (name of a child in the circle) stole/took the cookie/cookies from the cookie jar.
Accused: Who, me?
Accuser/Group: Yes, you!
Accused: Couldn't be!
Accuser/Group: Then who?

This is followed by the "accused" saying the name of someone else, as "(name of a person in the circle) stole the cookie from the cookie jar," and the subsequent back-and-forth lines are repeated. The song may be repeated ad infinitum or it may end - if it is being performed as part of a game, where members of the group are eliminated by failing to keep up with the prescribed beat or eliminated as a result of being chosen as one of the accused, sometimes finishing with "We all stole/took the cookie/cookies from the cookie jar".

The fourth line is often changed to "Not me!" Sesame Street's version also changed the third line to "Yeah, you!"

== In popular culture ==
In the Wee Sing video "Grandpa's Magical Toys", while the children and toys are taking a brief break, they discover the cookies missing from the cookie jar and launch into the song, only for the cookie jar to point out at the end of the song that nobody took the cookies because they all ate them the day before.

The song is played thirteen times in the original live action version of Barney & Friends in the episodes "Caring Means Sharing", "Grandparents Are Grand!", and "Any Way You Slice It". In each episode, Barney leads the kids to a cookie jar, only to discover that all the cookies are gone, to which they launch into the song, each time with Kathy being the first one accused and Barney being the last one accused. Unlike the traditional version of the song, the first friend accused doesn't call out the name of the next friend; instead, Barney and the kids put their hands on their knees and give accusing looks to the music before singing the next suspect. After Barney has gone and the music between the verses plays again, the kids then repeat "Then who?" twice, followed by "It's you!" upon hearing or seeing the real culprit (with the exception of "Any Way You Slice It" in which they repeated "Then who?" a third time because the culprit wasn't revealed until right after the song ended). In "Caring Means Sharing", Baby Bop ate all the cookies and got a tummy-ache from it. In "Grandparents Are Grand!", Kathy's Nana took the cookies from the jar while Barney, the kids, and Derek's Grandpa were listening to a radio play and put them into bags for them to take home. In "Any Way You Slice It", Juan admitted to eating the cookies when he was hungry because he thought his brother Carlos didn't want them and apologized for it, but promised to ask first in future.

The song was used in a Sesame Street YouTube video in 2018. The title of the song was later referenced during the 2018 Sesame Street special When You Wish Upon A Pickle: at the beginning, Nina is finishing a Natalie Neptune story for Cookie Monster, Abby Cadaby, and the kids by explaining how Natalie used her detective methods to solve the mystery of who took the cookies from the cookie jar, at which Cookie asked who would ever do such a thing, besides him.

== See also ==
- The priest of the parish
