= Tia Tamera =

2019 single by Doja Cat

Single by Doja Cat featuring Rico Nasty

from the album Amala (Deluxe Edition)
- Released: February 20, 2019
- Recorded: 2018
- Studio: The Himalayas (Los Angeles, California)
- Genre: Hip hop
- Length: 3:32
- Label: Kemosabe; RCA
- Songwriters: Amala Zandile Dlamini; Kurtis McKenzie; Lydia Asrat; David Sprecher; Maria-Cecilia Simone Kelly
- Producers: Doja Cat; McKenzie

Doja Cat singles chronology
"Mooo!" (2018)	"Tia Tamera" (2019)	"Juicy" (2019)

Music video
- "Tia Tamera" on YouTube

"Tia Tamera" is a song by American rapper and singer Doja Cat featuring fellow American rapper Rico Nasty. It was written by Doja, Rico, Kurtis McKenzie, David Sprecher, and Lydia Asrat. It was released for digital download and streaming on February 20, 2019, by Kemosabe Records and RCA Records as the second single to the deluxe edition (and fourth overall) of Doja's debut album Amala.

== Composition and lyrics ==
The lyrics reference celebrities such as Aaliyah, Sia, Venus and Serena Williams, Regina Hall, Wiz Khalifa, Nia Long; organizations including Genius and PETA; films such as West Side Story and Madea's Family Reunion; the TV show Doug; songs such as "Rock the Boat"; and brands such as Chia Pet, Ikea, and Nokia. The title of the track is rapped throughout the lyrics as Doja compares her breasts to the twin actresses Tia and Tamera Mowry. Rico performs the last verse, and "flexes her bank account, [and] foreign whips".

== Critical reception ==
The song received acclaim from music critics for its eclectic lyrics and catchy flow. Okayplayer's Ivie Ani praises the track's lyricism, calling the composition "raunchy, rebellious, and real rap". The Brooklyn-based blog Brooklyn Vegan calls Rico's verse a "show-stopper", while Uproxx's Andre Gee describe both the song and music video as an "earworm of a hook and a colorful video that allowed each artist to be the vibrant characters we love them as".

== Music video ==
The music video, directed by Roxana Baldovin, premiered on YouTube on February 21, 2019. The video is a "candy-colored visual" of Doja and Rico competing in a '90s game show against respective lookalikes, with reference to the sitcom Sister, Sister and the Nickelodeon game show Double Dare. The video gives a "colorful 90's vibe". Pitchfork ranked it at 19 in their list of the top 20 music videos of 2019.

=== Synopsis ===
The video begins with Doja and Rico competing in a game show against their lookalikes. The duo watch the hip-hop rapper Ka5sh get slimed. The video references the 1997 comedy film B*A*P*S with redoing hairstyles from the main characters of the film, Nisi, played by Halle Berry, and Mickey, played by Natalie Desselle. During the final scenes, Doja and Rico pour neon yellow slime on the game show host.

== Credits and personnel ==
Adapted from Hot Pink (Japan Version) liner notes

Recording and management

- Engineered at The Himalayas (Los Angeles, California)
- Mastered at Bernie Grundman Mastering (Hollywood, California)
- Mau Publishing, Inc./Prescription Songs (BMI), The Arcade Songs LLC (BMI), Desta Melodies (BMI), Yeti Yeti Yeti Music/WB Music Corp. (ASCAP), WB Music Corp. (ASCAP)
- Rico Nasty appears courtesy of Warner Music/Atlantic Recording Corporation

Personnel

- Doja Cat – vocals, songwriting
- Kurtis McKenzie – songwriting; production
- Lydia Asrat – songwriting
- David Sprecher – songwriting; engineering as Yeti
- Rico Nasty – vocals, songwriting
- Neal H Pogue – mixing for Roselle, New Jersey.
- Mike Bozzi – mastering

== Certifications ==
Certifications for "Tia Tamera"
Region	Certification	Certified units/sales
Australia (ARIA)	Platinum	70,000^{‡}
Brazil (Pro-Música Brasil)	2× Platinum	80,000^{‡}
Canada (Music Canada)	2× Platinum	160,000^{‡}
New Zealand (RMNZ)	Platinum	30,000^{‡}
Poland (ZPAV)	Gold	25,000^{‡}
United Kingdom (BPI)	Silver	200,000^{‡}
United States (RIAA)	Platinum	1,000,000^{‡}
^{‡} Sales+streaming figures based on certification alone.

== Release history ==
Release dates and formats for "Tia Tamera"
Region	Date	Format(s)	Label(s)	Ref.
Various	February 20, 2019	Digital download; streaming	Kemosabe; RCA	
United States	June 4, 2019	Rhythmic radio	Kemosabe; RCA	
