= Yeti Beats =

American producer and songwriter (born 1981)

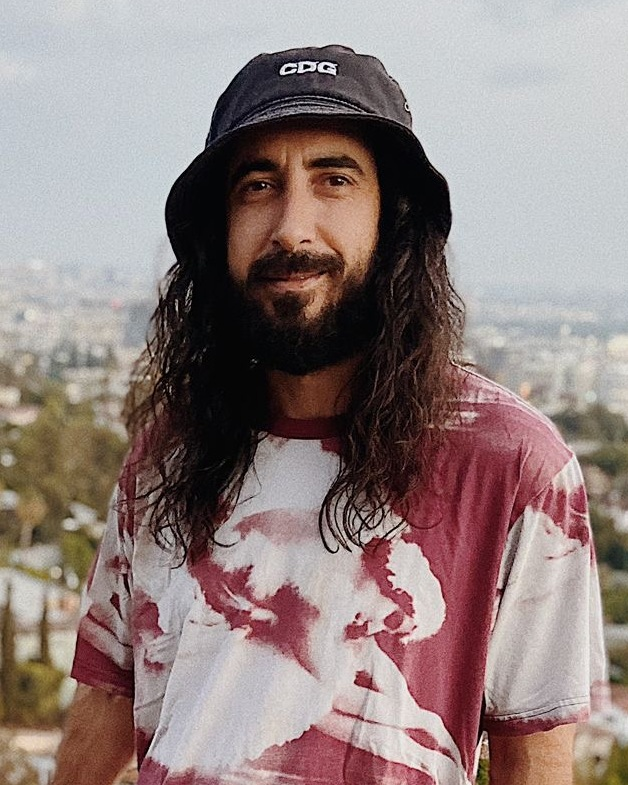
- Sprecher in 2021

Background information
- Born: David Alexander Sprecher; July 2, 1981 (age 45)
- Origin: California, U.S.
- Genres: Pop rap; R&B; reggae
- Occupations: Record producer; songwriter
- Years active: 2008–present

David Alexander Sprecher (born July 2, 1981), known professionally as Yeti Beats, is an American record producer, multi-instrumentalist, and songwriter. He has been nominated for four Grammy Awards and is best known for his extensive collaborations with Doja Cat. Sprecher began his professional career as a producer and DJ, working with hip hop artists including Kool Keith, Bushwick Bill, and Fatlip, and reggae artists like Sizzla, Konshens, and Rebelution. Yeti has served as executive producer across the first four of Doja Cat’s studio albums: Amala (2018), Hot Pink (2019), Planet Her (2021), and Scarlet (2023) and her debut EP Purrr (2014). Outside of his work with Doja Cat, Sprecher has produced and written music for a range of artists, including Shakira, Burna Boy, Beyoncé, David Guetta, Ozuna, Rawayana, Tokischa, Skillibeng, Sexyy Red, Tiago PZK, BJ The Chicago Kid, Jennifer Lopez, Chlöe, and more.

== Early life ==
Sprecher was born in Los Angeles, California, and moved to Santa Barbara at the age of 5. His early interest in music was supported by his parents. One of his first ventures into the music industry came in the form of a punk rock band which he joined while attending Santa Barbara High School. At age 17, the band was signed and toured the United States as part of the Vans Warped Tour. Marko DeSantis of the Santa Barbara Independent described Sprecher as “a soulful man negotiating his way out of his boyish frame”.

In 2000, Sprecher moved back to Los Angeles, where he studied Religious Studies and Studio Art at Occidental College. During this period, he broadened his musical interests beyond alternative rock, exploring hip-hop, reggae, electronic music, DJing, sampling, and beat-making.

The moniker “Yeti Beats” originated during this time, after a friend nicknamed him “Yeti” because of his long hair and mysterious demeanor. Sprecher added “Beats” to reflect his growing passion for production and rhythm-based music.

In 2003, Sprecher began producing music in his home studio, focusing initially on hip-hop and reggae. He collaborated with artists including Rebelution, Kool Keith, Sizzla, Junior Reid and Fatlip of The Pharcyde.

== Professional career ==
In 2010, Sprecher expanded his operations beyond the bedroom studio by opening a recording complex called The Himalayas in Echo Park. In this time, he worked with Doja Cat, Ho99o9, Rebelution and many more. In this era, Yeti also helped make original music for Dickhouse Productions show Loiter Squad and Steve-O documentary.

Sprecher relocated to a facility in Hollywood in 2015, before eventually transitioning to a home studio setup in 2020 as a result of constant touring and the Covid-19 pandemic, where he is known to prefer working “at his kitchen table with a simple setup”.

In May 2020, Sprecher signed an exclusive administration agreement with Warner Chappell Music. Ryan Press, President of A&R, described Yeti as “one of a kind with standout beat-making skills that speak for themselves”, adding that he had “no doubt that he’s well on his way to becoming one of the top producers in the industry”.

== Collaboration with Doja Cat ==
While working at The Himalayas, Sprecher discovered Doja Cat after Gerald (Jerry) Powell, publicly known as Tizhimself, then a studio assistant, came across one of her early uploads on SoundCloud. At the time, Doja Cat was 16 years old and was self-writing and recording from her bedroom.

Sprecher played a central role in the production and development of Doja Cat’s debut album Amala. He co-produced the breakout single “Candy”, which at its streaming peak was gaining more than a million streams a day on Spotify. The song peaked at number 86 on the Billboard Hot 100 and is certified Platinum in the United States.

He also executive produced Hot Pink, which featured the hit single “Say So”. The track became Doja Cat’s first top-10 hit, peaking at number five on the Billboard Hot 100. A remix featuring Nicki Minaj later reached number one on May 11th 2020, marking the first female rap collaboration to top the chart.

Sprecher continued his work on Doja Cat’s third studio album Planet Her, including producing the Grammy Award-winning single “Kiss Me More” featuring SZA. The song spent 19 consecutive weeks in the Billboard Hot 100 top 10, setting a record for the longest-running top-10 entry by a female collaboration. It won the Grammy Award for Best Pop Duo/Group Performance and was also nominated for Record of the Year and Song of the Year. Another track from the album, “Woman”, also produced by Sprecher, became a sleeper hit and went triple Platinum. It earned Grammy nominations in 2023 for Record of the Year, Best Pop Solo Performance, and Best Music Video.

In 2022, Yeti co-produced a Doja Cat cover of Hole's “Celebrity Skin” for the 2022 Taco Bell Super Bowl commercial alongside Nick Long and Travis Barker. Sprecher wrote and produced Doja Cat’s single “Vegas”, the lead track from the Elvis movie soundtrack. The song became her seventh top-10 hit on the Billboard Hot 100 and received a Grammy nomination for Best Rap Performance.

== Awards & nominations ==
Awards and nominations
Year	Nominated work	Category	Result	Notes
2017	Falling into Place (Rebelution)	Best Reggae Album	Nominated	Yeti co-produced "Mirage" on this album
2021	"Say So" (Doja Cat)	Record of the Year	Nominated	
2021	"Say So" (Doja Cat)	Best Pop Solo Performance	Nominated	
2021	Hot Pink (Doja Cat)	Best New Artist	Nominated	Yeti executive produced Hot Pink
2022	"Kiss Me More" (Doja Cat featuring SZA)	Record of the Year	Nominated	
2022	"Kiss Me More" (Doja Cat featuring SZA)	Song of the Year	Nominated	
2022	"Kiss Me More" (Doja Cat featuring SZA)	Best Pop Duo/Group Performance	Won	
2022	"Need to Know" (Doja Cat)	Best Melodic Rap Performance	Nominated	
2022	Planet Her (Deluxe) (Doja Cat)	Album of the Year	Nominated	
2022	Planet Her (Deluxe) (Doja Cat)	Best Pop Vocal Album	Nominated	
2023	"Woman" (Doja Cat)	Record of the Year	Nominated	
2023	"Woman" (Doja Cat)	Best Pop Solo Performance	Nominated	
2023	"Woman" (Doja Cat)	Best Music Video	Nominated	
2023	"Vegas" (Doja Cat)	Best Rap Performance	Nominated	
2024	I Told Them... (Burna Boy)	Best Global Music Album	Nominated	Yeti co-produced "Tested, Approved and Trusted"
2025	¿Quién Trae las Cornetas? (Rawayana)	Best Latin Rock or Alternative Album	Won	Yeti co-produced "La Tormenta" featuring Servando, Rawayana
2025	Las Mujeres Ya No Lloran (Shakira)	Best Latin Pop Album	Won	Yeti co-produced "Cohete" featuring Rauw Alejandro

== Production discography ==
Year	Title	Artist(s)
2009	"Casting" (feat. Aynzli Jones)	Kool Keith, Denis Deft, Aynzli Jones
2009	"Photo Session"	Kool Keith, Denis Deft
2009	"Executive Suites"	Kool Keith, Denis Deft
2009	"Nasty Girl"	Kool Keith, Denis Deft, Mr. Maaly
2009	"Not the Same"	Kool Keith, Denis Deft
2009	"Real Superstars"	Kool Keith, Denis Deft, Survivor Slim, Semjase Santana
2010	"LA Girl"	Yeti Beats
2010	"LA Girl"	Fatlip
2010	"Dick Towel"	Kool Keith
2010	"Nobody Move"	Skotch Davis, Telli/Ninjasonik, Yellowman
2011	"Bushman"	Kool Keith, Yeti Beats
2011	"Bright Side of Life" (Yeti Beats Remix, feat. Junior Reid)	Rebelution
2011	"So High" (Yeti Beats Remix)	Rebelution
2011	"Closer I Get" (feat. John Popper of Blues Traveler)	Rebelution
2011	"Chronic" (feat. Jr. Reid, Ya Boy, Sizzla, Mr. Maaly & Kurupt)	Jr. Reid, Ya Boy, Sizzla, Mr. Maaly, Kurupt
2011	"The World" (feat. David Cash)	Jr. Reid, Ya Boy, Sizzla, Mr. Maaly, Kurupt, David Cash
2011	"Ur Mine" (feat. Barbie Hatch)	Jr. Reid, Ya Boy, Sizzla, Mr. Maaly, Kurupt, Barbie Hatch
2011	"The World" (feat. Kool Keith)	Jr. Reid, Ya Boy, Sizzla, Mr. Maaly, Kurupt
2011	"Up to U"	Jr. Reid, Ya Boy, Sizzla, Mr. Maaly, Kurupt
2011	"Live As One" (feat. Ras Congo & Kelli Love)	Jr. Reid, Ya Boy, Sizzla, Mr. Maaly, Kurupt
2011	"Find Your Way" (feat. Kelli Love)	Jr. Reid, Ya Boy, Sizzla, Mr. Maaly, Kurupt
2011	"Gunman" (feat. Tippa Irie)	Jr. Reid, Ya Boy, Sizzla, Mr. Maaly, Kurupt
2011	"Make It Work" (feat. Jr. Reid and Spragga Benz)	Jr. Reid, Ya Boy, Sizzla, Mr. Maaly, Kurupt
2011	"Flash a Smile" (feat. High Society)	Jr. Reid, Ya Boy, Sizzla, Mr. Maaly, Kurupt
2011	"What Time Is It?!" (feat. Fatlip, Slimkid Tre, and Aceyalone)	Jr. Reid, Ya Boy, Sizzla, Mr. Maaly, Kurupt
2011	"Forgiven" (feat. Bushwick Bill)	Jr. Reid, Ya Boy, Sizzla, Mr. Maaly, Kurupt
2011	"Greed" (feat. Fatlip and Pat Kim)	Jr. Reid, Ya Boy, Sizzla, Mr. Maaly, Kurupt
2011	"Don't Forget Me" (feat. Sizzla)	Jr. Reid, Ya Boy, Sizzla, Mr. Maaly, Kurupt
2012	"Worldwide Construction"	Yeti Beats, Kool Keith, Aceyalone, Fatlip
2012	"Good Vibes" (feat. Lutan Fyah)	Rebelution
2012	"Mona June" (Remix)	Slightly Stoopid, Marlon Asher, Fatlip
2013	"Chronic" (feat. Jr. Reid, Sizzla, Ya Boy & Mr. Maaly)	Yeti Beats
2013	"Gunman" (feat. Tippa Irie)	Yeti Beats
2013	"Marlon Asher" (feat. Slightly Stoopid)	Slightly Stoopid
2013	"Ganja Farmer / 4 AM Acoustic"	Slightly Stoopid
2014	"No Tan Listo"	Los Rakas
2014	"Africana"	Los Rakas
2014	"Control"	Doja Cat
2014	"PO-PO"	Yeti Beats
2015	"More Love" (Yeti Beats Remix)	Rebelution
2015	"Ghost"	Trouble Andrew
2015	"H8 It in Amerika"	Ho99o9
2015	"Cumrag"	Ho99o9
2015	"Get a Grip"	Ho99o9
2016	"Planet"	Daniella Mason
2016	"Mirage"	Rebelution
2016	"Double Barrell"	Ho99o9
2016	"3 x a Lady" (Yeti Beats Remix)	Roots of Creation
2017	"Hydrolics"	Ho99o9
2017	"Bleed War"	Ho99o9
2017	"Neighborhood Watch"	Ho99o9
2018	"Roll with Us"	Doja Cat
2018	"Champion"	Common Kings
2018	"Go to Town"	Doja Cat
2018	"Candy"	Doja Cat
2018	"Morning Light"	Doja Cat
2018	"Wine Pon You"	Doja Cat
2018	"Wild Beach"	Doja Cat
2018	"Cookie Jar"	Doja Cat
2018	"Casual"	Doja Cat
2018	"Fancy"	Doja Cat
2018	"Game"	Doja Cat
2018	"All Nighter"	Doja Cat
2018	"Broken Crowns"	Common Kings
2018	"One Day"	Common Kings
2018	"Today's a New Day"	Common Kings
2019	"Mooo!"	Doja Cat
2019	"Tia Tamera"	Doja Cat
2019	"Juicy"	Doja Cat
2019	"Juicy" (feat. Tyga)	Doja Cat, Tyga
2019	"Bottom Bitch"	Doja Cat
2019	"Rules"	Doja Cat
2019	"Like That"	Doja Cat
2019	"Streets"	Doja Cat
2019	"Better Than Me"	Doja Cat
2019	"Cyber Sex"	Doja Cat
2019	"Say So"	Doja Cat
2019	"Won't Bite"	Doja Cat
2019	"Stop It (Block It)"	Etana
2019	"Twist of Fate / Cobra"	Ho99o9
2020	"Say So" (feat. Nicki Minaj)	Doja Cat, Nicki Minaj
2020	"Fish in the Sea"	Common Kings, Marc E. Bassy
2020	"Freak"	Doja Cat
2020	"Christopher Dorner"	Ho99o9
2020	"I Pray" / "Prey"	Ho99o9
2020	"Summertime LA" (feat. Lady Tiagra)	Yeti Beats, Lady Tiagra
2021	"Woman"	StereoMadness, LINA
2021	"Kiss Me More"	Doja Cat, SZA
2021	"You Right"	The Weeknd, Doja Cat
2021	"Alone"	Doja Cat
2021	"Been Like This"	Doja Cat
2021	"Ain't Shit"	Doja Cat
2021	"Ride"	Doja Cat
2021	"Kiss Me More" (feat. Lynden)	DamiYoncé
2021	"Want to Love"	Konshens
2022	"Celebrity Skin"	Doja Cat
2022	"Break My Soul (The Queens Remix)"	Beyoncé, Madonna
2023	"Balut"	Doja Cat
2023	"Daddy"	Tokischa, Sexyy Red
2023	"Best Night of Your Life"	BJ the Chicago Kid
2023	"Spend the Night"	BJ the Chicago Kid, Coco Jones
2023	"Never Change"	BJ the Chicago Kid, Philip Bailey
2023	"Forgot Your Name"	BJ the Chicago Kid, Cory Henry
2023	"Liquor Store in the Sky"	BJ the Chicago Kid, Freddie Gibbs
2023	"Get Loose"	BJ the Chicago Kid
2023	"Who Cares"	BJ the Chicago Kid
2023	"Honey"	BJ the Chicago Kid, Chlöe
2023	"Long Time"	BJ the Chicago Kid
2023	"Smoke Break"	BJ the Chicago Kid, Robert Glasper
2023	"Feel Something Do Something"	BJ the Chicago Kid
2023	"Feel Good"	BJ the Chicago Kid
2023	"Crazy Love"	BJ the Chicago Kid, Andra Day
2023	"Nobody Knows"	BJ the Chicago Kid
2023	"We'll Be Alright" (Outro)	BJ the Chicago Kid
2023	"Tested, Approved & Trusted"	Burna Boy
2023	"La Tormenta"	Rawayana, Servando
2023	"Vocation"	Ozuna, David Guetta
2024	"OKLOSER"	Doja Cat
2024	"Boy Bye"	Chlöe
2024	"Boom" (feat. Tokischa)	Skillibeng, Tokischa
2024	"Boom"	Skillibeng
2024	"Mad in Love"	Jennifer Lopez
2024	"Cohete"	Shakira, Rauw Alejandro
2024	"Strawberry Lemonade"	Chlöe
2024	"Somebody"	Chlöe
2024	"Im Blessed"	Tiago PZK, Trueno
2025	"Just My Luck"	Obongjayar
2025	"Sweet Danger"	Obongjayar
2025	"Holy Mountain"	Obongjayar
2025	"Ende"	Nina Chuba
2025	"Nighttime Thing"	Alessia Cara
2025	"Nighttime Thing" (feat. Julia Michaels)	Alessia Cara, Julia Michaels
2026	"Cimarrón"	Rawayana feat. Joaquina
2026	"Como de Sol a Sol"	Rawayana feat. Carin León, Grupo Frontera
2026	"Reyimiller"	Rawayana
2026	"Se Presta"	Rawayana
2026	"Se Vienen Cositas"	Rawayana
2026	"Themselves"	Jordan Ward
2026	"Lola"	Tokischa

== Selected production discography ==
=== Albums and EPs ===
Title	Album details	Peak chart positions
Title	Album details	US
Peace of Mind	Released: 2012; Artist: Rebelution	13
Falling into Place	Released: 2016; Artist: Rebelution	32
Amala	Released: 2018; Artist: Doja Cat	138
Hot Pink	Released: 2019; Artist: Doja Cat	9
Planet Her	Released: 2021; Artist: Doja Cat	2
Gravy	Released: 2024; Artist: BJ The Chicago Kid	—

=== Singles ===
Title	Year	Peak chart positions						Certifications	Artist	Album
Title	Year	US	US R&B /HH	AUS	CAN	NZ	UK	Certifications	Artist	Album
"Candy"	2018	86	36	92	55	—	—		Doja Cat	Amala
"Mooo!"	2018	—	—	—	—	—	—		Doja Cat	Amala
"Tia Tamera" (with Rico Nasty)	2019	—	—	—	—	—	—		Doja Cat	Amala
"Juicy" (with Tyga)	2019	41	18	68	57	31	80		Doja Cat	Hot Pink
"Bottom Bitch"	2019	—	—	—	—	—	—		Doja Cat	Hot Pink
"Say So" (solo or featuring Nicki Minaj)	2020	1	1	4	3	3	2	RIAA: Platinum; ARIA: 2× Platinum; BPI: Gold; RMNZ: Platinum	Doja Cat	Hot Pink
"Kiss Me More" (featuring SZA)	2021	3	—	2	7	1	3		Doja Cat	Planet Her
"—" denotes a recording that did not chart or was not released in that territory.
