= Mooo! =

2018 single by Doja Cat

Single by Doja Cat

from the album Amala (Deluxe edition)
- Released: August 10, 2018
- Recorded: 2018
- Studio: Doja Cat's Bedroom (Los Angeles, California)
- Genre: Chillhop; parody rap
- Length: 4:46
- Label: Kemosabe; RCA
- Songwriters: Amala Dlamini; Antwoine Collins; David Sprecher; Pharrell Williams; Chad Hugo; Jonathan Smith; Michael Tyler; Bobby Sandimanie; Craig Lawson
- Producers: Doja Cat; Troy Nöka (co.); Yeti Beats (co.)

Doja Cat singles chronology
"Candy" (2018)	"Mooo!" (2018)	"Tia Tamera" (2019)

Music video
- "Mooo!" on YouTube

"Mooo!" (often stylized in all caps as "MOOO!") is a song by American rapper and singer Doja Cat. Originally self-published exclusively as a music video on August 10, 2018, it became a viral internet meme and amassed over 578 million views. It was subsequently released as the lead single from the deluxe edition (and third overall) of her debut studio album Amala. The viral success of "Mooo!" is considered a major factor in Doja Cat's internet fame, ultimately "setting the tone for her career", despite being considered by Doja Cat herself as a "throwaway" and a "joke".

== Background and recording ==
Prior to the release of "Mooo!", Doja Cat had released her "moderately successful" debut studio album, Amala, in March 2018. She developed the song as an inside joke alongside her fans in early August 2018, not expecting it to go further than SoundCloud. She told Dazed, "We started it on Instagram live, just me and 60 other people, and we all had fun coming up with puns and metaphors." The lyric “I’m not a cat, I don’t say meow” is a direct reference to her ex boyfriend, amateur DJ, Whiskers Po, formerly known as Meow Whiskers Po. They ended things not long before the release of Mooo! The song was inspired by Doja Cat's cow-print costume set which she wears throughout the song's music video. She wrote and recorded the song in six hours, while in bed in the costume. Doja Cat used a sample of Wes Montgomery's "Polka Dots and Moonbeams", which producer Troy NōKA had chopped and sent to her the night before. After making a beat with the sample and recording vocals in Logic Pro, she immediately began filming the song's music video from her bedroom. According to Doja Cat, she completed the song and its video within 12.5 hours of one day.

The song's music video gained over five million views in two weeks. After the video's viral success an updated single was released.

== Composition ==
"Mooo!"
Sample of the song's chorus

"Mooo!" was described by Vulture as "a rather simple, jazzy song about the important things in life: eating cheeseburgers, maybe doing some kissing, and generally not being in the mood to do anything else." A novelty song, Doja Cat raps about being a cow, despite her name, and the pleasures of farm life in a pseudo-sexual way. The song contains a plethora of cows "mooing" (mainly COW – SINGLE MOO, ANIMAL 02 from Sound Ideas's The General Series 6000) background vocals over "swelling harmonies" and jazz guitar. The refrain goes "Bitch I'm a cow / Bitch I'm a cow / I'm not a cat / I don't say meow". The song features a lyrical reference to the nursery rhyme "Old MacDonald Had a Farm", while also referencing hip hop songs including Ludacris's "Move Bitch", Schoolboy Q's "Collard Greens", Chamillionaire's "Ridin'", Kelis's "Milkshake", Tear Da Club Up Thugs's "Slob on My Knob", and Wu Tang Clan's "C.R.E.A.M.".

== Music video ==
Critics praised the video for its "DIY", "lo-fi", "low-budget" style, and for making use of many visual elements at-the-time independent rappers would employ such as memes and anime clips for backdrops.

To prepare for filming, Doja Cat hammered a green bed sheet to her bedroom wall to act as a green screen and inserted GIFs from Google into Photo Booth. The video for "Mooo!" features Doja Cat clad in cow-print pajamas with french fries in her nose and eating various fast food items. She raps in front of a green screen which alternates between cartoonish GIFs of food, farms, and bouncing anime breasts, as well as brief video samples from Cyriak's "cows & cows & cows". The video was filmed and edited by Doja Cat herself in the timespan of five hours maximum. She said in an interview that the green screen was actually made of her childhood bedsheets, as she was "obsessed with green" as a kid. The DIY video has been praised for its "lo-fi", and "low budget" nature. Sofia Mele of Billboard compared the video to that of John Mayer's "New Light" while describing it as a "meme-maker's paradise, charmingly kitschy in its use of green screen".

The American animal rights organization PETA responded to the song's music video with a parody video told from the perspective of a cow that Kristin Corry of Vice described as "pretty damn rude". Doja Cat responded to the parody, saying, "PETA can't say shit and they can suck it because I didn't actually hurt anybody. I didn't hurt any cows, dogs, cats, or frogs, or fucking ants. I'm not worth picking on." In addition to the parody, Doja Cat also responded to the negative criticism towards "Mooo!", tweeting: "I love that the majority of you guys are healthy and normal and then all of the people who don't like moo are taking their lives and a song I wrote about cows all too seriously, losing hair over it. I like to disappoint woke-hip-hop people."

== Reception ==
=== Critical response ===
Susanna Heller from Insider described it as "the song of the summer", "a classic", and "a bop". Jordan Sargent of The Face wrote that the song "might seem silly, but at its core it's a tender and affecting piece of songwriting about perseverance and individuality". Aaron Williams of Uproxx said the song was "silly and strange and alarmingly catchy, exactly the sort of thing calculated to go viral on social media" while praising the "bold, hilarious rhymes". "Mooo!" was ranked at No. 2 on Paper's list of The 100 Best Songs of 2018. Critics said the song was a great introduction to Doja Cat's catalog. Reporting for Pitchfork about Doja Cat's rise to fame with a throwaway song after the "sleepy rollout" of Amala, Rawiya Kameir wrote "The sudden attention from 'MOOO!' gave [Doja Cat] an opportunity to remake her career in a way that suited her personality more, and the influx of followers meant leverage. Still, she acknowledges that there was a little smarting at getting so much attention for a throwaway, instead of an album that she'd worked hard on." Nitish Pahwa of Slate said the "throwaway song" was "perhaps her most mainstream claim to fame".

=== Accolades ===
"Mooo!" was ranked in various critics' lists of the best songs and music videos of 2018.

Publication	Accolade	Rank	Ref.
Billboard	The 50 Best Music Videos of 2018	50	
Dazed	The 20 Best Songs of 2018	20	
The Fader	The 100 Best Songs of 2018	25	
NPR	The 100 Best Songs of 2018	35	
Paper	The 100 Best Songs of 2018	2	
Slant	The 25 Best Singles of 2018	10	
Spin	The 101 Best Songs of 2018	16	
Vibe	The 25 Hip Hop and R&B Music Videos of 2018	22	
Vulture	The 10 Best Music Videos of 2018	8	

== Credits and personnel ==
Recording and management

- Engineered at Doja Cat's Bedroom (Los Angeles, California)
- Mixed at Alcove Studios (Los Angeles, California)
- Mastered at Bernie Grundman Mastering (Hollywood, California)
- Published by Mau Publishing, Inc./Prescription Songs (BMI); Wiz Up Publishing/Sony/ATV Songs LLC (BMI); Yeti Yeti Yeti Music/WB Music Corp. (ASCAP); Universal Music Careers (BMI); EMI Blackwood Music, Inc. (BMI); Pharrell Pub Designee/Warner–Tamerlane Publishing Corp. (BMI); Block Off Broad Publishing/Ultra Empire Music (BMI); 10 × 2 Publishing/Ultra Tunes (ASCAP); Reservoir 416/Reservoir Media Management, Inc. (BMI); and Braids Publishing/Universal Music-Z Tunes (ASCAP)
- Contains portions of "Milkshake", written by Chad Hugo and Pharrell Williams; published by Universal Music Careers (BMI); EMI Blackwood Music, Inc. (BMI); Pharrell Pub Designee/Warner–Tamerlane Publishing Corp. (BMI); and portions of "Move Bitch", written by Craig Lawson, Bobby Sandimanie, Jonathan Smith and Michael Tyler; published by Block Off Broad Publishing/Ultra Empire Music (BMI); 10 × 2 Publishing/Ultra Tunes (ASCAP); Reservoir 416/Reservoir Media Management, Inc. (BMI); and Braids Publishing/Universal Music-Z Tunes (ASCAP)

Personnel

- Doja Cat – vocals, songwriting, production, engineering
- Antwoine Collins – songwriting; co-production, mixing as Troy Nöka
- David Sprecher – songwriting; co-production as Yeti
- Chad Hugo – songwriting
- Pharrell Williams – songwriting
- Craig Lawson – songwriting
- Bobby Sandimanie – songwriting
- Jonathan Smith – songwriting
- Michael Tyler – songwriting
- Mike Bozzi – mastering

Credits adapted from Hot Pink (Japan Version) liner notes.

== Certifications ==
Certifications for "Mooo!"
Region	Certification	Certified units/sales
Australia (ARIA)	Gold	35,000^{‡}
Brazil (Pro-Música Brasil)	Gold	20,000^{‡}
Canada (Music Canada)	Gold	40,000^{‡}
United States (RIAA)	Gold	500,000^{‡}
^{‡} Sales+streaming figures based on certification alone.
