= The Cookie Jar Foundation =

The Cookie Jar Foundation is a non-profit foundation established to help meet funding requirements for beneficiaries including the Edinburgh Sick Kids Hospital, the young persons group at Maggies Cancer Centre at the Western General Hospital and the cancer units at the Victoria Hospital, Kirkcaldy. The charity is named after Christopher "Cookie" Coutts who died after a valiant fight with Hodgkin's Lymphoma aged 19.

== Events ==
=== Dunfermline Press and Central Fife Times Charity of the Year 2015 ===
Nominated by employees at the Victoria Hospital in Kirkcaldy who used the vein-finder technology donated by the charity, the foundation was given this award for their numerous fundraising efforts and came within 18 months of their official charity status. At this point they had raised £33,000 in total and were awarded a further £400 as a result of their award.

=== Leon Rendle ===
The foundation got involved when hearing that Leon, battling a rare form of incurable cancer, was rejected insurance for one of his final wishes to fly to Orlando for a holiday with his family. The Cookie Jar assisted by seeking out alternative methods of getting the insurance from the United States in order to secure the family's holiday together.

=== The Long Road To Home 2014/London Marathon 2015 - Tom Main ===
Tom Main, a good friend of Christopher and his family, ran four marathons in four days from his University in Aberdeen to Christopher's home in Aberdour, Fife. His run accumulated 120 miles and raised a total of £3,000 for the foundation. A year later Tom ran the London Marathon without intense training to represent the fight that Christopher gave towards his illness. His efforts raised a further £1,400 for the charity.

=== The 5 Ferries Sponsored Cycle 2015 ===
The 5 Ferry Challenge was organised by the Edinburgh law firm MacLay, Murray and Spens (MMS) and took place on Saturday 30 May with a mixed group of 25 participants from MMS family and friends and cyclists. This event and numerous others organised by the firm raised £20,000 and the Cookie Jar remains as one of the firm's main supported charities.
