= Amala (album) =

- Standard edition cover (Note: The deluxe edition cover art depicts Doja Cat in a different pose, facing sideways while in a kneeling position. The word "deluxe" is printed in capital letters on the top right corner of the aforementioned cover art.)

Studio album by Doja Cat
- Released: March 30, 2018
- Recorded: 2014–2018
- Studios: The Himalayas (Los Angeles, California)
- Genres: Hip-hop; R&B
- Length: 45:13
- Labels: Kemosabe; RCA
- Producers: Doja Cat; Tizhimself; Rogét Chahayed; The Arcade; Troy Nöka; Cambo; Budo; Adrian X; Alizzz; Richie Beats; Kurtis McKenzie; Tyson Trax; Yeti Beats

Doja Cat chronology
Purrr! (2014)	Amala (2018)	Hot Pink (2019)

Singles from Amala
- 1. "Go to Town" Released: March 9, 2018; 2. "Candy" Released: March 23, 2018

Singles from Amala (Deluxe)
- 1. "Mooo!" Released: August 10, 2018; 2. "Tia Tamera" Released: February 20, 2019

Amala is the debut studio album by American rapper and singer Doja Cat. It was released on March 30, 2018, by Kemosabe Records and RCA Records. The album's deluxe version was released on March 1, 2019, and featured her breakthrough singles "Juicy", "Tia Tamera", and "Mooo!". In retrospect, Doja Cat has expressed strong disdain towards the record.

Upon its release, Amala was initially a commercial failure and was largely ignored by critics. In August 2018, the album and Doja Cat gained attention when her novelty song "Mooo!" became an internet meme. As a result, songs "Candy" and "Juicy" became sleeper hits, and the album debuted on the Billboard 200 chart in August 2019. Amala would eventually peak at number 138 on the chart in November 2019, coinciding with the release of her second studio album, Hot Pink.

== Background and release ==
On March 27, 2018, Doja Cat's label announced the album via Twitter. In addition to announcing the release date of the album, they also revealed the title of the project and its cover. When "Roll With Us" was released in February 2018 as the first promotional single, the album was originally titled Baby. Amala was later repackaged with a deluxe version on March 1, 2019, which added three new songs: "Juicy", "Tia Tamera", and "Mooo!".

The album isn't so much of a conceptual piece. It's more of a compilation and I think it shows more of my versatility as an artist. The thing about the album is that I've written so many songs on that album that are from years and years ago. And there are some songs on it that were totally new, so the album consists of three phases in my life.

— Doja Cat on the background of Amala

Doja Cat herself has expressed strong disdain toward the record, claiming that it does not entirely represent her as an artist. She has also stated that she believes it is not a "finished album", partially due to her constantly partying and being high on marijuana during its recording. Her first commercial release in four years, she revealed that it was also rushed in order to meet deadlines, and that it was made in a "difficult time" as she received "almost no support" before its release.

== Singles ==
"Roll With Us" was released as the album's sole promotional single on February 1, 2018, and entered the Spotify's Global Viral 50 chart upon release. The album's lead single, titled "Go To Town", was released on March 9, 2018, along with a music video. Doja Cat further went on to promote the single by appearing on Genius' show "Verified". In an interview with Elle in May 2022, she stated she regretted putting the song out, stating that her not being vocally and lyrically evolved makes the song "really difficult to listen to" for her.

A week before the album's release, "Candy", was released as the album's second single on March 23, 2018. Only a year later would the track become a sleeper hit after a dance challenge on the app TikTok went viral in late 2019. Consequently, the single charted in countries such as Australia, Canada and the United States, the latter having the song peak at 86 on the Billboard Hot 100, becoming her first solo entry on the chart.

The song "Mooo!" was originally released on August 10, 2018, exclusively to YouTube as a music video. The track would be the first of Doja's to become a viral phenomenon, and would eventually surpass over eighty million views on YouTube as of October 2020. The track was subsequently released commercially on streaming services, and would later serve as the first single off the deluxe edition of the album.

The second single from the deluxe edition (fourth overall), titled "Tia Tamera", featuring American rapper Rico Nasty, was released on February 20, 2019. A music video was released on the next day.

== Critical reception ==
Professional ratings
Review scores
Source	Rating
AllMusic	3.5/5 stars

Ranking it among their favorite albums of the first half of 2018, NPR described Amala as a "13-track collection of bubbly, hip-hop-influenced indie pop" and "manifesto of a young woman striving to take ownership of her craft, her image and her sexuality, mixing genres like dancehall, trap, house and R&B with a healthy dose of sass and humor."

== Track listing ==
Standard edition
No.	Title	Writer(s)	Producer(s)	Length
1.	"Go to Town"	Amala Dlamini; Gerard Powell II; David Sprecher; Rogét Chahayed; Rian Lewis	Tizhimself; Yeti Beats^{[a]}; Chahayed^{[b]}	3:37
2.	"Cookie Jar"	Dlamini; Chahayed; Sprecher; Jon Millis; Kurtis McKenzie	Chahayed; Yeti Beats; The Arcade	3:19
3.	"Roll with Us"	Dlamini; Sprecher; Chahayed; Powell	Yeti Beats; Tizhimself; Chahayed	3:00
4.	"Wine Pon You" (featuring Konshens)	Dlamini; Garfield Spence; Sprecher; Antwoine Collins	Yeti Beats; Troy Nōka^{[b]}	3:39
5.	"Fancy"	Dlamini; Sprecher	Yeti Beats; Doja Cat	2:59
6.	"Wild Beach"	Dlamini; Collins; Sprecher; Elizabeth Getz; Terence Coles	Troy Nōka; Yeti Beats	3:24
7.	"Morning Light"	Dlamini; Sprecher; Cameron Bartolini; Aaron Miller; Aaron Harmon; Jordan Reyes	Yeti Beats; Cambo	3:59
8.	"Candy"	Dlamini; Sprecher; Joshua Karp; Bartolini	Yeti Beats; Budo; Cambo^{[b]}	3:10
9.	"Game"	Dlamini; Sprecher; Adrian Eccleston; Bartolini	Yeti Beats; Adrian X; Cambo^{[b]}	3:15
10.	"Casual"	Dlamini; Collins; Sprecher; Carlos Muñoz; Getz	Troy Nōka; Yeti Beats; Loshendrix	4:00
11.	"Down Low"	Dlamini; Bartolini; Christian Quirante	Cambo; Alizzz	3:31
12.	"Body Language"	Dlamini; Rytchi Pronzola; Bartolini	Richie Beats; Cambo^{[a]}	4:05
13.	"All Nighter"	Dlamini; Sprecher	Doja Cat; Yeti Beats^{[a]}	3:13
Total length:				45:13

Deluxe edition
No.	Title	Writer(s)	Producer(s)	Length
14.	"Juicy"	Dlamini; Sprecher; Lukasz Gottwald; Lydia Asrat	Yeti Beats; Tyson Trax	3:20
15.	"Tia Tamera" (featuring Rico Nasty)	Dlamini; Maria-Cecilia Kelly; McKenzie; Sprecher; Asrat	Doja Cat; Kurtis McKenzie; Yeti Beats^{[b]}	3:32
16.	"Mooo!"	Dlamini; Collins; Sprecher; Pharrell Williams; Chad Hugo; Jonathan Smith; Michael Tyler; Bobby Sandimanie; Craig Lawson	Doja Cat; Troy Nōka^{[a]}; Yeti Beats^{[a]}	4:45
Total length:				56:10

=== Notes ===
- ^{^[a]} signifies a co-producer
- ^{^[b]} signifies an additional producer
- "Mooo!" contains portions of "Milkshake", as performed by Kelis from her 2003 album Tasty and "Move Bitch", as performed by Ludacris from his 2001 album Word of Mouf

== Personnel ==
- Doja Cat – lead vocals (all tracks), engineering (track 16)
- Neal H Pogue – mixing (tracks 1–13, 15)
- Clint Gibbs – mixing (track 14)
- Troy Nōka – mixing (track 16), background vocals (4)
- Rian Lewis – engineering (tracks 1–3, 5, 7, 9, 12, 13)
- Yeti Beats – engineering (tracks 3–10, 12, 13, 15)
- Macgregor Leo – engineering (track 5)
- Cambo – engineering (tracks 6–8, 10, 11)
- Kalani Thompson – engineering (track 14)
- Seth Ringo – engineering assistance (track 14)
- Tyler Sheppard – engineering assistance (track 14)
- Loshendrix – guitar (track 10)

== Charts ==
Chart performance for Amala
Chart (2019)	Peak position
Australia Hitseekers (ARIA)	10
US Billboard 200	138
US Top R&B Albums (Billboard)	16

== Certifications ==
Certifications and sales for Amala
Region	Certification	Certified units/sales
Brazil (Pro-Música Brasil)	Platinum	40,000^{‡}
New Zealand (RMNZ)	Platinum	15,000^{‡}
Poland (ZPAV)	Gold	10,000^{‡}
United Kingdom (BPI)	Gold	100,000^{‡}
United States (RIAA)	Gold	500,000^{‡}
^{‡} Sales+streaming figures based on certification alone.

== Release history ==
Release dates and formats for Amala
Region	Date	Format	Version	Label	Ref.
Various	March 30, 2018	Digital download; streaming	Standard	Kemosabe; RCA	
Various	March 1, 2019	Digital download; streaming	Deluxe	Kemosabe; RCA	
