= Cookie jar =

Jar used specifically to store edible treats such as cookies or biscuits

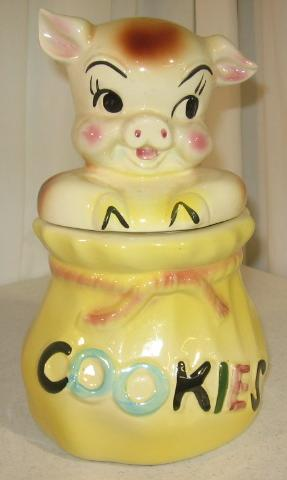
A pig-themed cookie jar

Cookie jars are utilitarian or decorative ceramic or glass jars often found in American and Canadian kitchens. In the United Kingdom, they are known as biscuit barrels or biscuit jars. If they are cans made out of tinplate, they are called biscuit tins. While used to store actual cookies or biscuits, they are sometimes employed to store other edible items like candy or dog treats, or non-edible items like currency (in the manner of a piggy bank).

== Other uses ==
- Sometimes the phrase "keep your hands out of the cookie jar" is a way of telling someone to stay out of other people's business, even when doing so seems lucrative.
- In financial reporting, "cookie jar accounting" is the practice of increasing reserves during good years and "eating them up" during bad years. This process of income smoothing is allowed, but non-disclosure – especially in order to consistently reach performance targets – is illegal.
- In computer programming, a "cookie jar" is an area of memory set aside for storing cookies.

=== Popular culture ===
- "Who Stole the Cookie from the Cookie Jar?" is an elementary school song.
- The American band Gym Class Heroes wrote a song called "Cookie Jar" which was released as a single in 2008.
- Musician Jack Johnson wrote a song called "Cookie Jar", on the 2003 album On and On.
- South Korean girl group Red Velvet released their debut Japanese EP titled #Cookie Jar in 2017, along with its lead single of the same name.

== Gallery ==
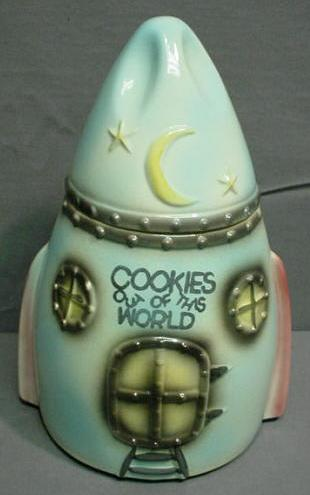
A rocket ship from American Bisque, ca. 1960. Space themes were popular as the space race began in earnest during the late 1950s

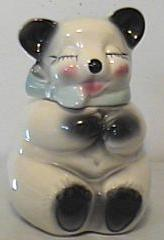
An American Bisque cookie jar using the Funny Animal theme popular in America during the 1950s

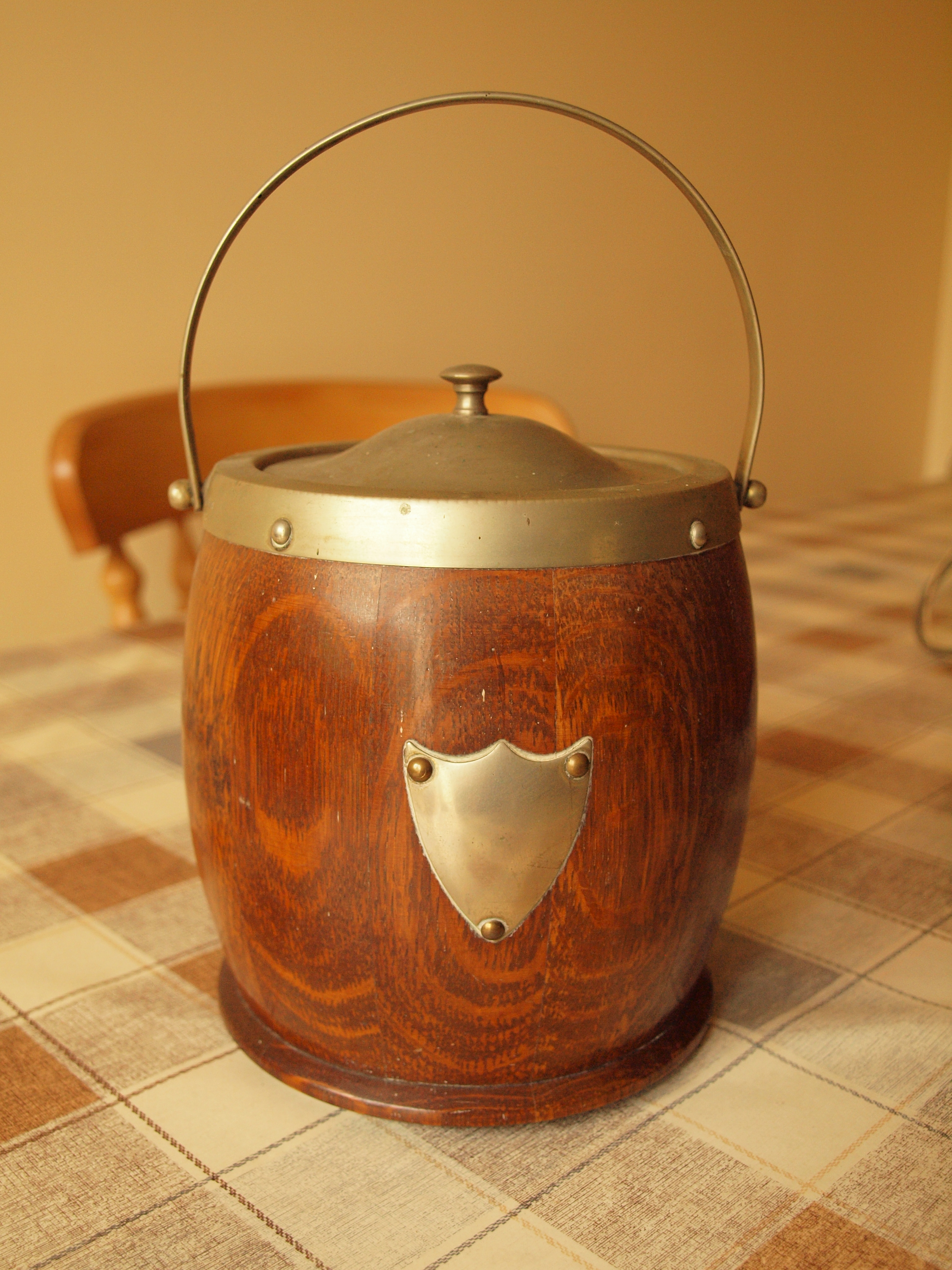
Wooden biscuit barrel from Ireland, early 20th century
