= Candy (Doja Cat song) =

2018 song by Doja Cat

Single by Doja Cat

from the album Amala
- Released: March 23, 2018
- Studio: The Himalayas (Los Angeles, California)
- Genre: Hip hop; R&B; trap
- Length: 3:10
- Label: Kemosabe; RCA
- Songwriters: Amala Zandile Dlamini; David Sprecher; Joshua Karp; Cameron Bartolini
- Producers: Budo; Yeti Beats; Cambo (add.)

Doja Cat singles chronology
"Go to Town" (2018)	"Candy" (2018)	"Mooo!" (2018)

"Candy" is a song by American rapper and singer Doja Cat for her debut album, Amala (2018). Originally put out in 2016 on SoundCloud, getting an early release alongside other Amala songs "Casual", "Roll With Us", and "All Nighter", the song was officially released on March 23, 2018, as the second single from the album, through Kemosabe and RCA. The song was written by Doja Cat alongside producers Budo & Yeti Beats and additional producer Cambo. "Candy" peaked at number 86 on the Billboard Hot 100 chart.

== Background and composition ==
Mixing was handled by Neal Pogue. "Candy" was released on March 23, 2018, as the second single from Doja Cat's debut studio album Amala (2018). Following its release, she posted a preview on her Instagram account. The audio video for the song premiered simultaneously as the single. According to the sheet music published at Musicnotes.com by Sony/ATV Music Publishing, the song is performed in the key of G minor with a tempo of 120 beats per minute.

== Critical reception ==
"Candy" received generally positive reviews from music critics. Mike Wass of Idolator praised it as a "trap-heavy hip-hop jam", and AllMusic's Matt Collar selected it as one of the album's highlights. Milca P. of HotNewHipHop praised the song's musical direction and said it "leans more toward the typically R&B-heavy catalog of the RCA signee". Rap-Up added to their blog "Rising rapper-singer Doja Cat continues to ‘push the envelope’ on her latest, risqué and sensually-driven single, Candy."

Andrew P. Hale for PopMatters described the song as "smooth but adult-oriented" and pointed it out for its sexual themes, writing that "A very smooth and intimate beat with a degree of excitement by Budo, Cambo, and Yeti Beats, Doja Cat rides it with confidence and talent. Better for husbands and wives, can't promote the content for the youth."

== Credits and personnel ==
Recording and management

- Engineered at The Himalayas (Los Angeles, California)
- Mastered at Bernie Grundman Mastering (Hollywood, California)
- Mau Publishing, Inc./Prescription Songs (BMI), Yeti Yeti Yeti Music/WB Music Corp. (ASCAP), GutterFunk/WB Music Corp. (ASCAP), Cameron Bartolini Music (ASCAP)

Personnel

- Doja Cat – vocals, songwriting
- David Sprecher – songwriting; production, engineering as Yeti
- Joshua Karp – songwriting; production as Budo
- Cameron Bartolini – songwriting; additional production, engineering as Cambo
- Neal H Pogue – mixing
- Mike Bozzi – mastering

Credits adapted from Hot Pink (Japan Version) liner notes.

== Charts ==
=== Weekly charts ===
Chart (2019–2020)	Peak position
Australia (ARIA)	92
Belgium (Ultratip Bubbling Under Flanders)	28
Canada Hot 100 (Billboard)	55
Greece (IFPI)	40
Ireland (IRMA)	81
Lithuania (AGATA)	34
Romania (Airplay 100)	71
US Billboard Hot 100	86
US Hot R&B/Hip-Hop Songs (Billboard)	36

=== Year-end charts ===
Chart (2020)	Position
Canada (Canadian Hot 100)	92
US Hot R&B Songs (Billboard)	41

== Certifications ==
Region	Certification	Certified units/sales
Australia (ARIA)	Platinum	70,000^{‡}
Brazil (Pro-Música Brasil)	Diamond	160,000^{‡}
Canada (Music Canada)	2× Platinum	160,000^{‡}
France (SNEP)	Gold	100,000^{‡}
New Zealand (RMNZ)	Platinum	30,000^{‡}
Poland (ZPAV)	Platinum	50,000^{‡}
United Kingdom (BPI)	Gold	400,000^{‡}
United States (RIAA)	Platinum	1,000,000^{‡}
^{‡} Sales+streaming figures based on certification alone.

== Release history ==
Country	Date	Format	Label	Ref.
United States	March 23, 2018	Digital download	Kemosabe Records; RCA Records	
United States	April 12, 2018	Urban contemporary radio	Kemosabe Records; RCA Records	
