= Cookie jar accounting =

Misleading accounting practice

Cookie jar accounting or cookie jar reserves is an accounting practice in which a company takes a quantity of large reserves from an economically successful year and applies them against losses from less successful years. Through this process, companies can mislead investors into believing that their losses are less than the actual value.

An example of a cookie jar reserve is a liability created when a company records an expense that is not directly linked to a specific accounting period—the expense may fall in one period or another. Companies may record such discretionary expense when profits are high because they can afford to take the hit to income. When profits are low, the company reduces the liability (the reserve) rather than recording an expense in the lean year.

The United States Securities and Exchange Commission (SEC) does not permit cookie jar accounting by public companies because it can mislead investors regarding a company's financial performance.

== Historic examples ==
Several companies have been caught using cookie jar accounting. Companies along with individual accountants have faced legal action from The Securities and Exchange Commission. Limited examples of lawsuits:

In October 1999, Microsoft was investigated for cookie jar accounting by the Securities and Exchange Commission for its alleged misconduct in recognizing revenue. At the center, was whether it was using financial reserves to shore up its financial earnings. Software companies are required to recognize revenue under rules set by American Institute of Certified Public Accountants, which set a threshold of persuasive evidence, which are based on satisfaction of delivery or when fees are mutually agreed upon.

In 2002, WorldCom Inc., the carrier of about half of all Internet traffic, used the cookie jar accounting methods by using reserves to boost their earnings. This case was the largest among those who misused reserves in the same way. More specifically, WorldCom increased provision for projected expenses and used these to increase the earnings amount. Once WorldCom filed for the largest bankruptcy case in the U.S., it revealed that the company hid $3.9 billion in expenses since 2001. As a result of this, WorldCom's CEO, Bernard Ebbers, and CFO, Scott Sullivan, were arrested with criminal charges filed by the SEC for fraud in 2002.

In 2004, Fannie Mae, a company created to promote home ownership by purchasing mortgages from banks that issue them to decrease interest rates, was caught in violation of accounting regulations that involve the recording of loans. The SEC ordered Fannie to restate its earnings over the prior four years to resolve this cookie jar accounting incident. The company showed concern about how this change will negatively impact it, yet still agreed to increase its capital reserves to $9.4 billion.

In 2004, Bristol-Myers Squibb, a New York-based pharmaceutical company was sued on August 4, 2004, by The Securities and Exchange Commission partly for using cookie jar accounting. The company used cookie jar accounting to give the perception of higher earnings, lower liabilities, and hid the company's plan of selling inventory to wholesales before providing goods which lead to higher revenue reporting. The company's misconduct resulted in a US$100 million-dollar civil penalty, US$50 million-dollar payment towards a fund for shareholders and creating an independent adviser position who is responsible for the oversight of accounting practices and accurate financial reporting used within the company.

In July 2009, a prior chief accounting officer at Beazer Homes, USA, Inc., was charged by The Securities and Exchange Commission, for using cookie jar accounting among other indictments. The chief accounting officer was accused of using the cookie jar accounting method to hide over US$60 million by increased land inventory accounts and net income in declining years and increased expense accounts in good years. During 2006 and the beginning of 2007, he misleading accounting practices lead to an overstatement of income and understatement of losses totaling US$47 million. The employee was sentenced to ten years in prison and three years supervised release.

In July 2010, Dell was accused, of fraudulently reporting its financial earnings to give the impression that it was exceeding analyst earnings projections. Dell had used undisclosed payments from Intel to smooth out volatility from poor earnings. Dell paid a $100 million penalty for it misconduct. None of the managers involved faced tough penalties that would convince investors of the company not manipulating figures in the future.
