= Latto discography =

Artist discography

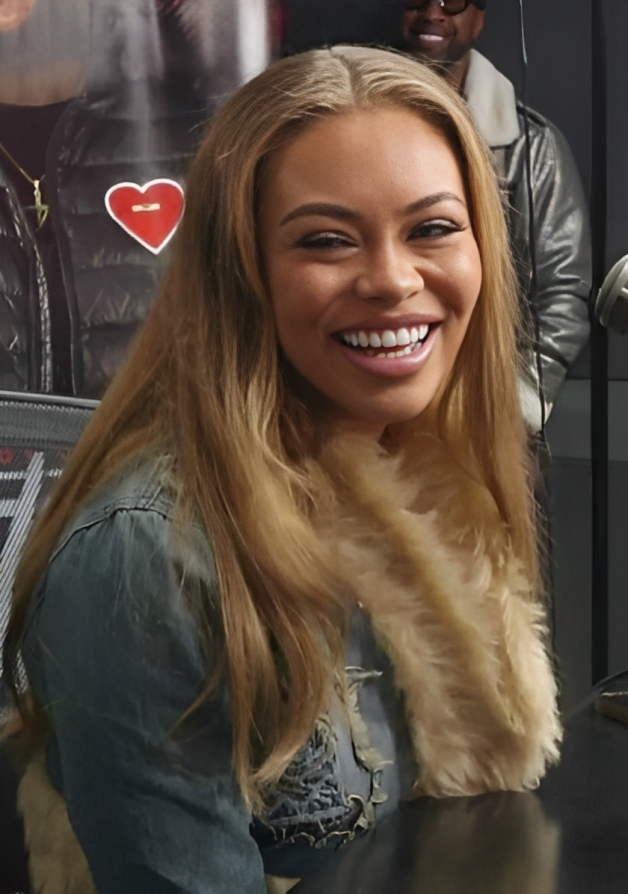
- Studio albums: 4
- EPs: 3
- Singles: 28
- Mixtapes: 3

American rapper Latto has released four studio albums, three mixtapes, three extended plays, and 28 singles as a lead artist. In 2019, Latto released the debut single "Bitch from da Souf", which became her first entry on the Billboard Hot 100 following a remix with American rappers Saweetie and Trina and was certified 2× Platinum by the RIAA. The follow-up single "Muwop" featuring Gucci Mane was certified Platinum as well. Both singles preceded her debut studio album, Queen of da Souf, which was released in 2020 and reached number 44 on the Billboard 200. In 2021, Latto released the single "Big Energy" as the lead single from her second studio album, 777, which peaked at number three on the Hot 100. In 2023, Latto's single "Put It on da Floor Again" featuring Cardi B reached number 13 on the Hot 100 and was certified Platinum by the RIAA. The same year, she achieved her first number-one hit on the Hot 100 and the Billboard Global 200 with her feature on Jung Kook's single "Seven".

== Studio albums ==
List of studio albums, with selected details, chart positions and certifications
Title	Details	Peak chart positions			Certifications
Title	Details	US	US R&B/HH	CAN	Certifications
Queen of da Souf	Released: August 21, 2020; Label: RCA, Streamcut; Format: Digital download, streaming	44	25	—	RIAA: Gold
777	Released: March 25, 2022; Label: RCA, Streamcut; Format: Digital download, streaming	15	8	60	RIAA: Gold; MC: Gold; RMNZ: Gold
Sugar Honey Iced Tea	Released: August 9, 2024; Label: RCA, Streamcut; Format: Digital download, streaming, CD, LP	15	2	—	RIAA: Gold
Big Mama	Released: May 29, 2026; Label: RCA, Streamcut; Format: Digital download, streaming, CD, LP	16	6	—	
"—" denotes a title that did not chart, or was not released in that territory.

== Mixtapes ==
List of mixtapes, with selected details
Title	Details
Miss Mulatto	Released: October 2, 2016; Label: Pittstop Ent.; Format: Digital download, streaming
Latto Let 'Em Know	Released: April 11, 2017; Label: Pittstop Ent.; Format: Digital download, streaming
Mulatto	Released: July 19, 2018; Label: Pittstop Ent.; Format: Digital download, streaming

== Extended plays ==
List of EPs, with selected details
Title	Details
Time and Pressure	Released: December 22, 2017; Label: Pittstop Ent.; Format: Digital download, streaming
Big Latto	Released: June 20, 2019; Label: Streamcut, Pittstop Ent.; Format: Digital download, streaming
Hit the Latto	Released: December 12, 2019; Label: Streamcut, Pittstop Ent.; Format: Digital download, streaming

== Singles ==
=== As lead artist ===
List of singles as lead artist, showing year released, chart positions, certifications and album name
Title	Year	Peak chart positions										Certifications	Album
Title	Year	US	US R&B/HH	US Rap	AUS	CAN	HUN	IRE	NZ	UK	WW	Certifications	Album
"Bitch from da Souf" (solo or remix with Saweetie and Trina) (Note: The solo version of "Bitch from da Souf" appears on the Big Latto EP whilst the remix with Saweetie and Trina is featured on the Hit the Latto EP as well as Queen of da Souf.)	2019	95	37	—	—	—	—	—	—	—	—	RIAA: 2× Platinum; MC: Gold	Queen of da Souf
"Muwop" (featuring Gucci Mane)	2020	— (Note: "Muwop" did not enter the Billboard Hot 100, but peaked at number four on the Bubbling Under Hot 100 Singles chart.)	40	—	—	—	—	—	—	—	—	RIAA: Platinum	Queen of da Souf
"On God"	2020	—	—	—	—	—	—	—	—	—	—		Queen of da Souf
"In n Out" (featuring City Girls)	2020	—	—	—	—	—	—	—	—	—	—		Queen of da Souf
"Sex Lies" (Note: "Sex Lies" is only included on the extended version of Queen of da Souf.) (featuring Lil Baby)	2020	—	—	—	—	—	—	—	—	—	—		Queen of da Souf
"Nasty" (with Rich the Kid and Flo Milli featuring Rubi Rose)	2021	—	—	—	—	—	—	—	—	—	—		Lucky 7
"Beat Box (Big Latto Mix)" (with SpotemGottem)	2021	—	—	—	—	—	—	—	—	—	—		Non-album singles
"The Biggest"	2021	—	—	—	—	—	—	—	—	—	—		Non-album singles
"Fast Lane" (with Don Toliver and Lil Durk)	2021	—	—	—	—	—	—	—	—	—	—		F9: The Fast Saga
"Big Energy" (solo or remix with Mariah Carey featuring DJ Khaled)	2021	3	1	1	6	9	16	20	12	21	32	RIAA: 4× Platinum; ARIA: 3× Platinum; BPI: Platinum; MC: 4× Platinum; RMNZ: 3× Platinum	777
"Soufside"	2021	—	—	—	—	—	—	—	—	—	—		777
"Wheelie" (featuring 21 Savage)	2022	— (Note: "Wheelie" did not enter the Billboard Hot 100, but peaked at number 14 on the Bubbling Under Hot 100 Singles chart.)	—	—	—	—	—	—	— (Note: "Wheelie" did not enter the NZ Top 40 Singles Chart, but peaked at number 35 on the NZ Hot Singles Chart.)	—	—		777
"Sunshine" (featuring Lil Wayne and Childish Gambino)	2022	— (Note: "Sunshine" did not enter the Billboard Hot 100, but peaked at number 25 on the Bubbling Under Hot 100 Singles chart.)	—	—	—	—	—	—	— (Note: "Sunshine" did not enter the NZ Top 40 Singles Chart, but peaked at number 33 on the NZ Hot Singles Chart.)	—	—		777
"I Just Called" (with Neiked and Anne-Marie)	2022	—	—	—	—	—	—	—	— (Note: "I Just Called" did not enter the NZ Top 40 Singles Chart, but peaked at number 24 on the NZ Hot Singles Chart.)	99	—		Non-album singles
"Pussy"	2022	—	—	—	—	—	—	—	—	—	—		Non-album singles
"FTCU" (featuring GloRilla and Gangsta Boo)	2022	—	—	—	—	—	—	—	—	—	—		Non-album singles
"Another Nasty Song"	2022	—	—	—	—	—	—	—	—	—	—		Non-album singles
"Lottery" (featuring Lu Kala)	2023	83	29	17	—	51	10	—	— (Note: "Lottery" did not enter the NZ Top 40 Singles Chart, but peaked at number 32 on the NZ Hot Singles Chart.)	—	—	MC: Gold	Non-album singles
"Put It on da Floor" (solo or remix featuring Cardi B)	2023	13	6	3	—	—	—	—	— (Note: "Put It on da Floor" did not enter the NZ Top 40 Singles Chart, but peaked at number 36 on the NZ Hot Singles Chart.)	—	66	RIAA: 2× Platinum; MC: Gold	Sugar Honey Iced Tea
"Issa Party" (featuring BabyDrill)	2023	—	—	—	—	—	—	—	—	—	—		Non-album single
"Sunday Service" (solo or remix featuring Megan Thee Stallion and Flo Milli)	2024	100	26	20	—	—	—	—	—	—	—	RIAA: Platinum	Sugar Honey Iced Tea
"Big Mama"	2024	92	23	19	—	—	—	—	—	—	—	RIAA: Gold	Sugar Honey Iced Tea
"Brokey"	2024	84	24	14	—	—	—	—	—	—	—	RIAA: Gold	Sugar Honey Iced Tea
"Blick Sum" (solo or remix featuring Playboi Carti)	2025	— (Note: "Blick Sum" did not enter the Billboard Hot 100, but peaked at number two on the Bubbling Under Hot 100 chart.)	32	18	—	—	—	—	— (Note: "Blick Sum" did not enter the NZ Top 40 Singles Chart, but peaked at number 20 on the NZ Hot Singles Chart.)	—	—	RIAA: Gold	Sugar Honey Iced Tea
"Somebody"	2025	94	18	11	—	—	—	—	— (Note: "Somebody" did not enter the NZ Top 40 Singles Chart, but peaked at number 25 on the NZ Hot Singles Chart.)	—	—	RIAA: Gold	Big Mama
"Gyatt" (with Ice Spice)	2025	— (Note: "Gyatt" did not enter the Billboard Hot 100, but peaked at number one on the Bubbling Under Hot 100 chart.)	23	13	—	—	—	—	— (Note: "Gyatt" did not enter the NZ Top 40 Singles Chart, but peaked at number 20 on the NZ Hot Singles Chart.)	—	—		Non-album single
"Go Girl" (with Summer Walker and Doja Cat)	2026	60	11	—	—	—	—	—	—	—	—		Finally Over It
"Business & Personal (Intro)"	2026	— (Note: "Business & Personal (Intro)" did not enter the Billboard Hot 100, but peaked at number 24 on the Bubbling Under Hot 100 chart.)	34	—	—	—	—	—	—	—	—		Big Mama
"GOMF" (featuring GloRilla)	2026	90	28	12	—	—	—	—	—	—	—		Big Mama
"Okayyy" (featuring Doja Cat)	2026	93	23	15	—	—	—	—	— (Note: "Okayyy" did not enter the NZ Top 40 Singles Chart, but peaked at number 37 on the NZ Hot Singles Chart.)	—	—		Big Mama
"—" denotes a title that did not chart, or was not released in that territory.

=== As featured artist ===
List of singles as featured artist, showing year released, chart positions, certifications and album name
Title	Year	Peak chart positions										Certifications	Album
Title	Year	US	US R&B/HH	US Rap	AUS	CAN	IRE	JPN	NZ	UK	WW	Certifications	Album
"Pretty Girl (Remix)" (Yung Baby Tate featuring Killumantii and Latto)	2019	—	—	—	—	—	—	—	—	—	—		Girls
"Thot Box (Remix)" (Hitmaka featuring Young M.A, Dreezy, Latto, DreamDoll, and Chinese Kitty)	2019	—	—	—	—	—	—	—	—	—	—		Non-album single
"Up & Down" (Saucy Santana featuring Latto)	2020	—	—	—	—	—	—	—	—	—	—		Pretty Little Gangsta
"Thirsty" (Good Girl featuring Latto)	2020	—	—	—	—	—	—	—	—	—	—		Non-album singles
"Kirk" (Duke Deuce featuring Latto)	2020	—	—	—	—	—	—	—	—	—	—		Non-album singles
"Make Em Say" (NLE Choppa featuring Latto)	2020	—	—	—	—	—	—	—	—	—	—		Top Shotta
"Wake Up" (Ty Bri featuring Latto)	2020	—	—	—	—	—	—	—	—	—	—		Non-album singles
"Down" (G-Eazy featuring Latto)	2020	—	—	—	—	—	—	—	—	—	—		Non-album singles
"Do It (Remix)" (Chloe x Halle and Doja Cat featuring City Girls and Latto)	2020	—	—	—	—	—	—	—	— (Note: "Do It (Remix)" did not enter the NZ Top 40 Singles Chart, but peaked at number 38 on the NZ Hot Singles Chart.)	—	—		Non-album singles
"Meeting" (Gucci Mane featuring Foogiano and Latto)	2020	—	—	—	—	—	—	—	—	—	—		So Icy Gang, Vol. 1
“Bad Azz” (Kash Doll featuring Latto and Benny the Butcher)	2020	—	—	—	—	—	—	—	—	—	—		Non-album singles
"Brat" (Tay Money featuring Latto)	2020	—	—	—	—	—	—	—	—	—	—		Non-album singles
"Bitter" (Queen Naija featuring Latto)	2020	—	—	—	—	—	—	—	—	—	—		Missunderstood
"Freak Show" (Yung Bans featuring Latto)	2020	—	—	—	—	—	—	—	—	—	—		Non-album single
"Quarantine Thick" (2 Chainz featuring Latto)	2020	— (Note: "Quarantine Thick" did not enter the Billboard Hot 100, but peaked at number 17 on the Bubbling Under Hot 100 Singles chart.)	—	—	—	—	—	—	—	—	—		So Help Me God!
"Go Crazy (Remix)" (Chris Brown and Young Thug featuring Future, Lil Durk, and Latto)	2021	—	—	—	—	—	—	—	— (Note: "Go Crazy (Remix)" did not enter the NZ Top 40 Singles Chart, but peaked at number 27 on the NZ Hot Singles Chart.)	—	—		Non-album single
"Mmm Mmm (Remix)" (Kaliii featuring ATL Jacob, Latto, and Moneybagg Yo)	2021	—	—	—	—	—	—	—	—	—	—		Toxic Chocolate
"Mind Yo Business" (Lakeyah featuring Latto)	2022	—	—	—	—	—	—	—	—	—	—		No Pressure (Pt. 1)
"Booty" (Saucy Santana featuring Latto)	2022	—	—	—	—	—	—	—	—	—	—		Non-album singles
"One Light (Remix)" (Maroon 5 and Bantu featuring Yung Bleu and Latto)	2022	—	—	—	—	—	—	—	—	—	—		Non-album singles
"For the Night" (Chlöe featuring Latto)	2022	— (Note: "For the Night" did not enter the Billboard Hot 100, but peaked at number 25 on the Bubbling Under Hot 100 Singles chart.)	—	—	—	—	—	—	— (Note: "Do It (Remix)" did not enter the NZ Top 40 Singles Chart, but peaked at number 35 on the NZ Hot Singles Chart.)	—	—		Non-album singles
"Don't Play with It (Remix)" (Lola Brooke featuring Yung Miami and Latto)	2023	69	21	11	—	—	—	—	—	—	—		Dennis Daughter
"Seven" (Jung Kook featuring Latto)	2023	1	—	—	2	5	7	2	2	3	1	RIAA: Platinum; BPI: Platinum; MC: 4× Platinum; RIAJ: Platinum; RMNZ: Platinum	Golden
"Too Fast (Pull Over)" (Jay Rock and Anderson .Paak featuring Latto)	2023	—	—	—	—	—	—	—	—	—	—		Non-album singles
"Champagne Shit (Remix)" (Janelle Monáe featuring Latto and Quavo)	2023	—	—	—	—	—	—	—	—	—	—		Non-album singles
"Can't Get Enough (Remix)" (Jennifer Lopez featuring Latto)	2024	—	—	—	—	—	—	—	—	—	—		This Is Me... Now (Deluxe)
"Art" (Nemzzz featuring Latto)	2025	—	—	—	—	—	—	—	—	97	—		TBA
"—" denotes a title that did not chart, or was not released in that territory.

=== Promotional singles ===
List of promotional singles, showing year released and album name
Title	Year	Album
"Same Road" (with Bandit Gang Marco)	2016	Non-album singles
"I Got Moves (#UsherRaymond)" (featuring C-White)	2017	Non-album singles
"Response Diss"	2017	Non-album singles
"Hobby" (featuring D-Low)	2017	Non-album singles
"Cash Walk" (featuring 2-Crucial)	2017	Non-album singles
"Check Me Out"	2017	Non-album singles
"Infidelity" (with Coca Vango)	2018	Mulatto
"Goin On"	2018	Non-album singles
"Let Em Know"	2018	Non-album singles
"South Beach Freestyle"	2019	Non-album singles
"ChaseDaMoney Freestyle"	2019	Non-album singles
"Big Latto Freestyle"	2019	Non-album singles
"F**k Rice Street"	2019	Non-album singles
"See Sum"	2019	Hit the Latto
"No Panties"	2019	Hit the Latto
"No Hook"	2020	Queen of da Souf
"He Say She Say"	2020	Queen of da Souf

== Other charted and certified songs ==
List of other charted songs, showing year released, chart positions and album name
Title	Year	Peak chart positions						Certifications	Album
Title	Year	US	US R&B/HH	CAN	JPN Dig.	KOR	NZ Hot	Certifications	Album
"Nasty Nasty" (Boosie Badazz featuring Latto)	2019	—	—	—	—	—	—	RIAA: Platinum	Talk Dat Shit
"Budget" (Megan Thee Stallion featuring Latto)	2022	87	31	—	—	—	20		Traumazine
"Bills Paid" (DJ Khaled featuring Latto and City Girls)	2022	— (Note: "Bills Paid" did not enter the Billboard Hot 100, but peaked at number six on the Bubbling Under Hot 100 Singles chart.)	35	—	—	—	—		God Did
"Seven (Explicit)" (Jung Kook featuring Latto)	2023	—	—	—	—	47	—		Golden
"Seven (Instrumental)" (Jung Kook featuring Latto)	2023	—	—	—	15	— (Note: "Seven" (Instrumental) did not enter the Circle Digital Chart, but peaked at number 50 on the component Download Chart.)	—		Seven (Weekday Ver.)
"Seven (Summer Mix)" (Jung Kook featuring Latto)	2023	—	—	—	19	— (Note: "Seven" (Band version) did not enter the Circle Digital Chart, but peaked at number 62 on the component Download Chart.)	—		Seven (Weekday Ver.)
"Seven (Band version)" (Jung Kook featuring Latto)	2023	—	—	—	27	— (Note: "Seven" (Band version) did not enter the Circle Digital Chart, but peaked at number 68 on the component Download Chart.)	—		Seven (Weekday Ver.)
"Seven (Island Mix)" (Jung Kook featuring Latto)	2023	—	—	—	—	— (Note: "Seven" (Island Mix) did not enter the Circle Digital Chart, but peaked at number 138 on the component Download Chart.)	—		Seven (Weekend Ver.)
"Seven (Nightfall Mix)" (Jung Kook featuring Latto)	2023	—	—	—	—	— (Note: "Seven" (Nightfall Mix) did not enter the Circle Digital Chart, but peaked at number 130 on the component Download Chart.)	—		Seven (Weekend Ver.)
"Seven (Festival Mix)" (Jung Kook featuring Latto)	2023	—	—	—	—	— (Note: "Seven" (Festival Mix) did not enter the Circle Digital Chart, but peaked at number 135 on the component Download Chart.)	—		Seven (Weekend Ver.)
"Seven (Lo-fi Mix)" (Jung Kook featuring Latto)	2023	—	—	—	—	— (Note: "Seven" (Lo-fi Mix) did not enter the Circle Digital Chart, but peaked at number 133 on the component Download Chart.)	—		Seven (Weekend Ver.)
"Seven (Alesso Remix)" (Jung Kook featuring Latto)	2023	—	—	—	28	— (Note: "Seven" (Alesso Remix) did not enter the Circle Digital Chart, but peaked at number 90 on the component Download Chart.)	—		Seven (Alesso Remix)
"Seven (David Guetta Remix)" (Jung Kook featuring Latto)	2023	—	—	—	—	— (Note: "Seven" (David Guetta Remix) did not enter the Circle Digital Chart, but peaked at number 137 on the component Download Chart.)	—		Seven (David Guetta Remix)
"H&M"	2024	—	49	—	—	—	—		Sugar Honey Iced Tea
"Housekeeping Knows" (Drake featuring Latto)	2024	85	22	72	—	—	14		100 Gigs
"Procedure" (GloRilla featuring Latto)	2024	— (Note: "Procedure" did not enter the Billboard Hot 100, but peaked at number one on the Bubbling Under Hot 100 Singles chart.)	41	—	—	—	—		Glorious
"Pop It" (with 21 Savage)	2025	— (Note: "Pop It" did not enter the Billboard Hot 100, but peaked at number four on the Bubbling Under Hot 100 Singles chart.)	22	—	—	—	—		What Happened to the Streets?
"Chrome Heart Diaper Bag"	2026	— (Note: "Chrome Heart Diaper Bag" did not enter the Billboard Hot 100, but peaked at number 22 on the Bubbling Under Hot 100 Singles chart.)	—	—	—	—	—		Big Mama
"Hostage" (with 21 Savage)	2026	88	39	—	—	—	—		Big Mama
"—" denotes a title that did not chart, or was not released in that territory.

== Guest appearances ==
List of guest appearances, showing year released, other artists and album name
Title	Year	Other artist(s)	Album
"Stylin'"	2013	The Luxurious Girls	Non-album singles
"Tough on the Internet"	2016	Lil Niqo	Non-album singles
"Current $eas"	2016	Jām	4ouroz1love, Pt. 1
"You Thought"	2017	Mani, Phresh Ali	Non-album single
"U Ain't Got"	2017	Lil Richye	Boss Moves
"Feelings"	2017	Bandit Gang Marco	Tom Ford
"Maybe"	2017	Bandit Gang Marco	Bars & Notes
"Forever"	2017	Bandit Gang Marco	Loveoohyie2
"How to Dance"	2018	Trend-n-Topic	Non-album singles
"Hitta"	2018	Tae Tae Tae	Non-album singles
"I Need a Real B*tch"	2018	Young Scooter, Karlae	The Recipe
"Stop Stalling"	2019	Ezzy Money	Non-album single
"Can't Be Mine"	2019	Dubba-AA	The Flex Tape
"Nasty"	2019	Boosie Badazz	Talk Dat Shit
"Can't Believe Her"	2019	VL Deck	Trap Pastor 2
"Lane"	2019	Shunie	Shunie World
"Murder She Wrote"	2019	Sirius	Bacc Like I Never Left
"Getting That Money"	2019	Cassius Jay, Hoodrich Pablo Juan, Tokyo Vanity	God Bless Da 6
"Touch Me"	2019	Mak Sauce	Non-album singles
"Cash App"	2019	Executive Coops, The Execs	Non-album singles
"Don't Wanna Leave"	2019	Jacob Latimore	C3
"Who is You"	2019	Cuban Doll	Karma
"Ready"	2020	Tre Trax	Non-album single
"Do I"	2021	Whipped Cream, Baby Goth	Who Is Whipped Cream?
"Kash App"	2021	BRS Kash	Kash Only
"Striptease"	2021	French Montana, Ty Dolla Sign	They Got Amnesia
"Didn't Say"	2022	Ella Mai	Heart on My Sleeve
"Live My Best Life"	2022	Calvin Harris, Snoop Dogg	Funk Wav Bounces Vol. 2
"Budget"	2022	Megan Thee Stallion	Traumazine
"Bills Paid"	2022	DJ Khaled, City Girls	God Did
"F.N.F. (Let's Go) - Remix"	2022	Hitkidd, GloRilla, JT	Non-album single
"Fine as Can Be"	2023	Offset	Set It Off
"Special"	2024	Lyrical Lemonade, Swae Lee, Aminé	All Is Yellow
"A-Town Girl"	2024	Usher	Coming Home
"Housekeeping Knows"	2024	Drake	100 Gigs
"Procedure"	2024	GloRilla	Glorious
"This Right Here"	2025	Ciara, Jazze Pha	CiCi
"ErrTime" (remix)	2025	Cardi B	Am I the Drama?
"Go Girl"	2025	Summer Walker, Doja Cat	Finally Over It
"Pop It"	2025	21 Savage	What Happened to the Streets?
"Ok"	2026	Nemzzz	Locked In
