= Sugar Honey Iced Tea Tour =

2024–2025 concert tour by Latto

Sugar Honey Iced Tour
- Tour by Latto
- Promotional poster for the tour
- Associated album: Sugar Honey Iced Tea
- Start date: October 25, 2024
- End date: July 6, 2025
- Legs: 2
- No. of shows: 30
- Supporting acts: Mariah the Scientist, Karrahbooo
- Attendance: 26,457 (Note: Based on the first 5 reported dates)
- Box office: $1,750,780

Latto concert chronology
- 777 Tour (2022); Sugar Honey Iced Tour (2024)

The Sugar Honey Iced Tea Tour was the second-headlining concert tour by American rapper Latto. It was announced on August 14, 2024, in support of her third studio album Sugar Honey Iced Tea (2024). October 25, 2024, in Tampa, Florida and concluded on July 6, 2025, in Liège, Belgium.

== Background ==
On August 14, 2024, Latto announced the North American dates of the "Sugar Honey Iced Tea Tour", with Mariah the Scientist & Karrahbooo as supporting acts. On April 17, 2025, Latto announced the European dates of the tour. Due to the high-demand of the London shows, Latto added a second show. The African leg of the tour is planned to take place in Winter 2025.

== Critical reception ==
Uproxx praised the show at YouTube Theater, highlighting how Latto cultivated a boldly empowering space—predominantly women "decked out in Latto's signature leopard print." The focus remained on her rap roots rather than chart-topping pop hits. Tracks like "Big Mama," "B*tch From Da Souf," "Muwop," "Put It On Da Floor," and "Sunday Service" ignited the crowd. The performance was seen as a confident assertion of her dual pop/rap identity, with noticeable growth in both stagecraft and credibility since previous tours.

== Set list ==
This set list is from the Tampa show on October 25, 2024. It is not intended to represent all dates throughout the tour.

1. "Georgia Peach"
2. "There She Go"
3. "Housekeeping Knows"
4. "Back Outside"
5. "H&M"
6. "Blick Sum"
7. "Settle Down"
8. "Bitch from da Souf"
9. "Muwop"
10. "Cooper Cove"
11. "Nasty Nasty"
12. "Another Nasty Song"
13. "Liquor"
14. "Look What You Did"
15. "Prized Possession"
16. "S/O to Me"
17. "Brokey"
18. "Sunday Service"
19. "Chicken Grease"
20. "Put It on da Floor"

Encore

21. "Big Mama"

=== Guest performers ===
- At the Inglewood concert, Flo Milli performed "Never Lose Me".

== Tour dates ==
List of 2024 concerts
Date	City	Country	Venue	Opening Act	Attendees	Revenue
October 26, 2024	Tampa	United States	Yuengling Center	Mariah the Scientist; Karrahbooo	—	—
October 27, 2024	Nashville	United States	Nashville Municipal Auditorium	Mariah the Scientist; Karrahbooo	—	—
October 28, 2024	Washington, D.C.	United States	The Anthem	Mariah the Scientist; Karrahbooo	6,000 / 6,000	$402,600
October 29, 2024	Philadelphia	United States	The Met Philadelphia	Mariah the Scientist; Karrahbooo	—	—
October 31, 2024	Brooklyn	United States	Barclays Center	Mariah the Scientist; Karrahbooo	7,161 / 7,161	$492,265
November 1, 2024	Cincinnati	United States	The Andrew J. Brady Music Center	Mariah the Scientist; Karrahbooo	—	—
November 3, 2024	Bridgeport	United States	Total Mortgage Arena	Mariah the Scientist; Karrahbooo	—	—
November 4, 2024	Boston	United States	MGM Music Hall	Mariah the Scientist; Karrahbooo	3,640 / 5,009	$191,585
November 7, 2024	Toronto	Canada	History	Mariah the Scientist; Karrahbooo	—	—
November 11, 2024	Detroit	United States	Fox Theatre	Mariah the Scientist; Karrahbooo	4,600 / 5,048	$311,297
November 12, 2024	Chicago	United States	Byline Bank Aragon Ballroom	Mariah the Scientist; Karrahbooo	—	—
November 15, 2024	Dallas	United States	South Side Ballroom	Mariah the Scientist; Karrahbooo	—	—
November 16, 2024	Houston	United States	713 Music Hall	Mariah the Scientist; Karrahbooo	—	—
November 17, 2024	Austin	United States	Stubb's Waller Creek Amphitheater	Mariah the Scientist; Karrahbooo	—	—
November 21, 2024	San Diego	United States	Cal Coast Credit Union Open Air Theatre	Mariah the Scientist; Karrahbooo	—	—
November 25, 2024	Seattle	United States	WAMU Theater	Mariah the Scientist; Karrahbooo	—	—
November 26, 2024	Vancouver	Canada	PNE Forum	Mariah the Scientist; Karrahbooo	—	—
November 29, 2024	San Francisco	United States	Bill Graham Civic Auditorium	Mariah the Scientist; Karrahbooo	—	—
December 1, 2024	Inglewood	United States	YouTube Theater	Mariah the Scientist; Karrahbooo	5,056 / 5,056	$353,033
December 4, 2024	Phoenix	United States	Arizona Financial Theatre	Mariah the Scientist; Karrahbooo	—	—
December 5, 2024	Las Vegas	United States	Brooklyn Bowl	Mariah the Scientist; Karrahbooo	—	—
December 7, 2024	Denver	United States	Fillmore Auditorium	Mariah the Scientist; Karrahbooo	—	—

List of 2025 concerts
Date	City	Country	Venue	Opening Act	Attendees	Revenue
June 7, 2025 (Note: The concert on June 7, 2025 was a part of the DLT Malta Festival.)	St. Paul’s Bay	Malta	Bora Bora Ibiza-Malta Resort	—	—	—
June 18, 2025	London	England	Roundhouse	—	—	—
June 19, 2025	London	England	Roundhouse	—	—	—
June 26, 2025	Berlin	Germany	Astra Kulturhaus	—	—	—
June 28, 2025 (Note: The concert on June 28, 2025 was a part of the Tinderbox Festival.)	Odense	Denmark	Tusindårsskoven	—	—	—
July 1, 2025	Amsterdam	Netherlands	Paradiso	—	—	—
July 4, 2025 (Note: The concert on July 4, 2025 was a part of the Yardland Festival.)	Paris	France	Hippodrome de Vincennes	—	—	—
July 6, 2025 (Note: The concert on July 6, 2025 was a part of the Les Ardentes Festival.)	Liège	Belgium	Astrid Park	—	—	—
Total					26,457 / 28,274 (93.14%)	$1,750,780 (5 shows)
