= Nemzzz =

British rapper (born 2004)

- Also known as: Mr. DND
- Born: Nemiah Emmanuel Simms; 28 March 2004 (age 22); Manchester, England
- Genre: UK rap
- Occupation: Rapper
- Years active: 2018–present
- Website: https://www.nemzzz.com/

Nemiah Emmanuel Simms (born 28 March 2004), known professionally as Nemzzz, is a British rapper who gained recognition in 2021 with the tracks "Elevate" and "2MS". He released his first mixtape Do Not Disturb in 2024, which debuted at number 17 on the UK Albums Chart.

== Early life ==
Nemiah Emmanuel Simms was born in Manchester, England and was raised in the Gorton area. His mother and uncle were beatmakers and his father was a reggae and bashment singer. Simms is of Jamaican descent.

== Career ==
=== 2018–2023: Beginnings and Nemzzz Type Beat ===
Nemzzz began rapping in 2018 by practicing with YouTube instrumentals. His first viral track "Elevate" released in November 2021 and received a music video from GRM Daily. Nemzzz followed up with the song "2MS" in February 2022 which garnered further attention. He collaborated with Stay Flee Get Lizzy and Knucks on the November 2022 song "No Refunds". He continued a steady stream of single releases until the May 2023 EP Nemzzz Type Beat.

=== 2023–2024: Do Not Disturb ===
In October 2023, Nemzzz released the track "Money and Vibes," the first single to his debut mixtape. He followed up with the track "8AM In Manny" in November, which gained him a cosign from Drake. Another song, "Therapy", was released in December. In February 2024, the mixtape Do Not Disturb was announced alongside the release of the single "L's". The track "PTSD" was released in the same month. On 15 March 2024, Do Not Disturb was released with features from Luciano and JayG. Three days later, a deluxe edition with additional features from K-Trap, Headie One, and Lil Yachty released. The mixtape debuted at number 17 on the UK Albums Chart, number one on the UK R&B Albums Chart, number 3 on the UK Independent Albums Chart, number 129 on the Belgium Albums chart, number 81 on the Irish Albums Chart, number 3 on the Scottish Albums Chart, number 38 on the Official New Zealand Music Chart, number 99 on the Associação Fonográfica Portuguesa chart and number 69 on the Swiss Hitparade chart.

On 16 May 2024, Nemzzz released the single "ATM". It was followed by "WYA" the following month, and then "Escape" in July. In September 2024, Nemzzz released his On The Radar Freestyle. In the same month, he featured on the UK remix of A Boogie Wit da Hoodie's single "Body" and on the remix of "Beckham" by Dee Billz. On 17 October 2024, the single "Evicted" released. On 13 November 2024 he featured on the single "Spinnin" with Australian drill collective Onefour. The following month, he released the single "Us vs Them".

=== 2025–present: Rent's Due and Locked In ===
On 16 January 2025, Nemzzz featured on fellow rapper KidWild's single "Redemption". On 13 February he released the single "Cold", which was the lead single and intro to the mixtape Rent's Due. The single charted number 92 on the UK singles chart, number 36 on the UK Independent Singles Chart and number 19 on the New Zealand singles chart. On March 6 he released the second single "Bad Decisions". It charted number 22 on the New Zealand singles chart. Nemzzz released his second mixtape Rent's Due on March 28 and featured guest appearances from Central Cee and Kyle Richh. The deluxe released three days later on March 31 adding an additional four songs alongside guest appearances from D-Block Europe and Chy Cartier. Rent's Due debuted at number 6 on the Official Album Chart, number 1 on the UK R&B Albums Chart, number 2 on the UK Independent Albums Chart, number 43 on the Belgium Albums chart, number 38 on the Irish Albums Chart, number 25 on the Official New Zealand Music Chart and number 7 on Scottish Albums Chart. The song "Dilemma" featuring Central Cee, debuted at number 39 on the UK Official Singles Chart, marking his highest charting song to date, number 8 on the UK Independent Singles Chart and number 84 on the Irish Singles Chart.

Nemzzz released the lead single to his third mixtape Locked In, "Geekin" featuring Lil Yachty, on 8 May 2026. Nemzzz would released the second single "Killn Em" on 26 June 2026. The third single, "Prince of the Scene", was released 30 July 2026. The fourth and final single "4AM" was released on 13 August 2026. Nemzzz would release his third mixtape Locked In on 4 September 2026. The mixtape featured guest appearances from Lil Yachty, Cash Cobain, Latto, Travis Scott and Tunde.

== Discography ==
=== Mixtapes ===
List of mixtapes, with selected details and peak chart positions
Title	Details	Peak chart positions										Certifications
Title	Details	UK	UK R&B	UK Ind.	AUS	BEL	IRE	NZ	POR	SCO	SWI	Certifications
Do Not Disturb	Released: 15 March 2024; Label: Self-released; Format: CD, cassette, digital download, streaming	17	1	3	—	129	81	38	99	3	69	BPI: Silver
Rent's Due	Released: 28 March 2025; Label: Self-released; Format: CD, LP, cassette, digital download, streaming	6	1	2	—	43	38	25	—	7	25	
Locked In	Released: 4 September 2026; Label: Self-released; Format: CD, LP, cassette, digital download, streaming	64	2	—	45	165	—	29	—	—	28	

=== EPs ===
Title	Details
Nemzzz Type Beat	Released: 19 May 2023; Label: Self-released; Format: Digital download, streaming
From Me 2 U	Released: 21 November 2025; Label: Self-released; Format: Digital download, streaming

=== Singles ===
==== As lead artist ====
List of singles as a lead artist, with selected chart positions and certifications, year released, and album name
Title	Year	Peak chart positions						Certifications	Album
Title	Year	UK	UK R&B	UK Ind	CAN	IRE	NZ Hot	Certifications	Album
"Youngest in Charge (Freestyle)"	2018	—	—	—	—	—	—		Non-album singles
"Pull Up"	2019	—	—	—	—	—	—		Non-album singles
"No Replies"	2019	—	—	—	—	—	—		Non-album singles
"Deep End"	2019	—	—	—	—	—	—		Non-album singles
"Paranoid"	2020	—	—	—	—	—	—		Non-album singles
"Can't Slip"	2020	—	—	—	—	—	—		Non-album singles
"Transparent"	2020	—	—	—	—	—	—		Non-album singles
"We Move"	2021	—	—	—	—	—	—		Non-album singles
"No Ratings"	2021	—	—	—	—	—	—		Non-album singles
"Elevate"	2021	78	37	16	—	98	32	BPI: Silver	Non-album singles
"2MS"	2022	—	—	—	—	—	32	BPI: Silver	Non-album singles
"LSW"	2022	—	—	—	—	—	—		Non-album singles
"DL4V"	2022	—	—	—	—	—	—		Non-album singles
"ABC"	2022	—	—	—	—	—	—		Non-album singles
"Don't Lie" (with A1 x J1)	2022	—	—	—	—	—	—		Non-album singles
"Daily Duppy" (featuring GRM Daily)	2022	—	—	—	—	—	—		Non-album singles
"W2L"	2023	—	—	—	—	—	—		Non-album singles
"Nemzzz Type Beat"	2023	—	—	—	—	—	—		Nemzzz Type Beat
"Fenty Beauty"	2023	—	—	—	—	—	—		Nemzzz Type Beat
"Money and Vibes"	2023	—	—	—	—	—	25		Do Not Disturb
"8AM in Manny"	2023	—	—	—	—	—	—		Non-album singles
"Therapy"	2023	—	—	—	—	—	—		Non-album singles
"L's"	2024	—	—	—	—	—	—		Do Not Disturb
"PTSD"	2024	—	—	—	—	—	26		Do Not Disturb
"ETA" (featuring Luciano)	2024	—	—	—	—	—	—		Do Not Disturb
"Kitchen Stove (Remix)" (with Pozer and JS x YD)	2024	—	—	—	—	—	—	BPI: Silver	Non-album singles
"ATM"	2024	—	—	48	—	—	11		Non-album singles
"WYA"	2024	—	—	—	—	—	33		Non-album singles
"Beckham (Remix)" (with Dee Billz, Kyle Richh, Kai Swervo, KJ Svervo and 41)	2024	—	—	—	—	—	—		Non-album singles
"Escape"	2024	—	—	—	—	—	33		Non-album singles
"Evicted"	2024	—	—	—	—	—	29		Non-album singles
"Spinnin" (with Onefour)	2024	—	—	—	—	—	29	ARIA: Gold	Look at Me Now
"Us vs Them"	2024	—	—	—	—	—	26		Non-album single
"Redemption" (with Kidwild)	2025	77	—	30	—	—	—		Distro Kid
"Cold"	2025	92	—	36	—	—	19		Rent's Due
"Bad Decisions"	2025	—	—	—	—	—	22		Rent's Due
"Art" (featuring Latto)	2025	97	31	—	—	—	14		Non-album singles
"AP Freestyle"	2025	—	—	—	—	—	34		Non-album singles
"8PM"	2025	—	—	—	—	—	22		From Me 2 U
"Geekin" (featuring Lil Yachty)	2026	—	—	—	—	—	11		Locked In
"Locked In Freestyle"	2026	—	—	—	—	—	—		Non-album single
"Killin Em"	2026	—	—	—	—	—	20		Locked In
"Prince of the Scene"	2026	—	—	—	—	—	—		Locked In
"4AM"	2026	—	—	—	—	—	—		Locked In
"OK" (featuring Latto)	2026	—	—	—	—	—	18		Locked In
"Gass" (featuring Travis Scott)	2026	61	13	—	69	—	4		Locked In
"—" denotes a recording that did not chart or was not released in that territory.

==== As featured artist ====
List of singles as a featured artist, showing year released, and album name
Title	Year	Album
"Up Suh" (Zeddy featuring Nemzzz)	2021	Non-album single
"Like Dat" (M1onthebeat featuring Nemzzz and SL)	2023	M1onTheBeat the Mixtape
"Brilliant Mind II" (Blanco featuring Nemzzz)	2023	Gilberto’s Son
"No Refunds" (Stay Flee Get Lizzy featuring Nemzzz and Knucks)	2024	Stars Aligned
"Body (UK Remix)" (A Boogie wit da Hoodie featuring Nemzzz)	2024	Non-album singles
"Maintenance Man" (41 featuring Nemzzz and Dee Billz)	2024	Non-album singles
"Figura Pública" (Veigh featuring Nemzzz)	2024	Non-album singles
"Station" (Genezio and Tiakola featuring Nemzzz)	2026	Fara Fara Gang

=== Other charted songs ===
List of other charted songs, with selected chart positions and album name
Title	Year	Peak chart positions					Album
Title	Year	UK	UK Indie	GRE Int.	IRE	NZ Hot	Album
"Dilemma" (featuring Central Cee)	2025	39	8	58	84	—	Rent's Due
"Today"	2026	—	—	—	—	34	Locked In

=== Guest appearances ===
List of non-single guest appearances, showing year released, other artist(s), album name, and credit(s)
Title	Year	Other artist(s)	Album
"Zoom"	2020	Re Up Tee	Jungle Activities
"Headline"	2022	Rimzee	Cold Feet
"Trenchezzz"	2023	Kitschkreig	German Engineering 1
"Hakkasan"	2023	Adzmilli, Kidwild	Lo(v/s)er
"Love You More"	2024	Luciano	Seductive
"Head n'Shoulders, p.II"	2025	Yc	Swang
"3am"	2025	PlaqueBoyMax, 5STAR	London
"1942"	2025	PlaqueBoyMax, 5STAR	London
"Talking Stage"	2025	AJ Tracey	Don't Die Before You're Dead
"Private Flights"	2025	D-Block Europe	PTSD 2
"TNT"	2026	Kidwild	Job's Not Done
"Doing The Most"	2026	K-Trap	Trapo 2
"Open Top"	2026	Headie One	MMM

== Awards and nominations ==
=== APRA Music Awards ===
The APRA Music Awards were established by Australasian Performing Right Association (APRA) in 1982 to honour the achievements of songwriters and music composers, and to recognise their song writing skills, sales and airplay performance, by its members annually.

Year	Nominee / work	Award	Result	Ref.
2026	"Spinnin'" (Onefour featuring Nemzzz) (Jerome Misa / Salec Su'a / Hoi Tang / Nemiah Simms / Robin Turrini)	Most Performed Hip Hop/Rap Work	Won	
