= Do Not Disturb (mixtape) =

Mixtape by Nemzzz
- Released: 15 March 2024
- Recorded: 2023–2024
- Length: 23:00
- Label: Self-released
- Producers: Aifo; Homage; Keyon; Kie; Macshooter; Nico Baran; prodapo; SaiOnTheBeat; Taps; TK The Producer; VID; ZEL

Nemzzz chronology
Nemzzz Type Beat (2023)	Do Not Disturb (2024)	Rent's Due (2025)

Singles from Do Not Disturb
- 1. "Money and Vibes" Released: 19 October 2023; 2. "L's" Released: 1 February 2024; 3. "PTSD" Released: 22 February 2024; 4. "ETA" Released: 14 March 2024

Do Not Disturb is the debut mixtape by British rapper Nemzzz, released independently on March 15, 2024. It features guest appearances from Luciano and JayG. The deluxe edition adds additional appearances from Lil Yachty, Headie One and K-Trap. The mixtape debuted at number 17 on the UK Albums Chart.

== Singles ==
The lead single "Money and Vibes" was released on 19 October 2023. The single peaked at number 25 on the New Zealand Hot Singles Chart. The second single "L's" was released on 1 February 2024. The third single "PTSD" was released on 22 February 2024 and peaked at number 26 on the New Zealand Hot Singles Chart. The fourth and final single "ETA", featuring German rapper Luciano, was released on 14 March 2024.

== Track listing ==
Do Not Disturb track listing
No.	Title	Writer(s)	Producer(s)	Length
1.	"Reflection"	Nemiah Simms; Denzel Ugoji; Tapiwa Nemhara; Homage; prodapo	ZEL; Taps; Homage; prodapo	2:02
2.	"ETA" (featuring Luciano)	Simms; Patrick Großmann; Ugoji	ZEL	2:40
3.	"PTSD"	Simms; Ugoji	ZEL	2:09
4.	"L's"	Simms; Ugoji; Aifo	ZEL; Aifo	1:57
5.	"Doom"	Simms; Ugoji; Kie	ZEL; Kie	2:13
6.	"Star Sign"	Simms; Ugoji; Nico Baran	ZEL; Nico Baran	2:30
7.	"Need You"	Simms; Ugoji; Macshooter; Keyon	ZEL; Macshooter; Keyon	2:01
8.	"Reassurance"	Simms; Ugoji	ZEL	1:34
9.	"Venice" (featuring JayG)	Simms; JayG; Ugoji; Nico Baran	ZEL; Nico Baran	1:44
10.	"DND"	Simms; Ugoji; Nico Baran	ZEL; Nico Baran	2:08
11.	"Money and Vibes"	Simms; Justin Timberlake; Pharrell Williams; Chad Hugo; Clara La San; TK The Producer; Ugoji	ZEL; TK the Producer	2:02
Total length:				23:00

Do Not Disturb (Deluxe) track listing
No.	Title	Writer(s)	Producer(s)	Length
12.	"It's Us" (featuring Lil Yachty)	Simms; Miles McCollum; Ugoji	ZEL	2:03
13.	"I Know You Care" (featuring Headie One)	Simms; Irving Adjei; Ugoji; Omar Ageyi	ZEL; Elkan	2:57
14.	"Mayfair" (featuring K-Trap)	Simms; Devonte Perkins; Ugoji; SaiOnTheBeat	ZEL; SaiOnTheBeat	2:07
15.	"Get Money"	Simms; Ugoji; Omar Ageyi; VID	ZEL; Elkan; VID	1:32
Total length:				31:45

Notes

- Track 11, "Money and Vibes", samples "Rock Your Body" by Justin Timberlake produced by The Neptunes.

== Charts ==
Chart performance for Do Not Disturb
Chart (2024)	Peak position
Belgian Albums (Ultratop Flanders)	129
Irish Albums (IRMA)	81
New Zealand Albums (RMNZ)	38
Scottish Albums (OCC)	3
Portuguese Albums (AFP)	99
Swiss Albums (Schweizer Hitparade)	69
UK Albums (OCC)	17
UK Independent Albums (OCC)	3
UK R&B Albums (OCC)	1

== Certifications ==
Certifications for Do Not Disturb
Region	Certification	Certified units/sales
United Kingdom (BPI)	Silver	60,000^{‡}
^{‡} Sales+streaming figures based on certification alone.
