= The Rap Game =

- Genre: Reality, talent
- Presented by: Jermaine Dupri
- Country of origin: United States
- Original language: English
- No. of seasons: 5
- No. of episodes: 55

Production
- Running time: 42 minutes
- Production company: Intuitive Entertainment

Original release
- Network: Lifetime
- Release: January 1, 2016 – March 7, 2019

The Rap Game is an American reality television series. The series premiered on January 1, 2016, on Lifetime. The winners of seasons 1-5 respectively, were Latto, Mani, Nova, Street Bud, and Tyeler Reign.

Other notable contestants that appeared on the show and competed on another include J.I the Prince of N.Y (season 2), and King Roscoe and Flau'Jae (both in season 3). The later two competed on America's Got Talent (King Roscoe in Season 9 in 2014 and Flau'Jae in season 13 in 2018). Season 4's Lil Bri appeared on season 2 of The Four: Battle for Stardom in 2018.

== Episodes ==
=== Series overview ===
Season	Episodes	Originally released	
Season	Episodes	First released	Last released
1	9	January 1, 2016	February 26, 2016
2	10	July 22, 2016	September 23, 2016
3	13	January 13, 2017	April 7, 2017
4	13	November 24, 2017	February 23, 2018
5	10	January 10, 2019	March 7, 2019

=== Season 1 (2016) ===
No. overall	No. in season	Title	Original release date	US viewers (millions)
1	1	"Welcome to Atlanta"	January 1, 2016	1.14
2	2	"Set the Booth on Fire"	January 8, 2016	1.03
3	3	"Style and Swagga"	January 15, 2016	1.15
4	4	"Betta Step Up"	January 22, 2016	1.33
5	5	"Gettin' Schooled"	January 29, 2016	1.17
6	6	"Shakin' Things Up"	February 5, 2016	1.34
7	7	"Fights, Camera, Action!"	February 12, 2016	1.15
8	8	"The Final Battle"	February 19, 2016	N/A
9	9	"Reunion"	February 26, 2016	1.22

=== Season 2 (2016) ===
This season's contestants were Nia Kay, Jayla Marie, Lil' Key, J.I and Mani, Mini Barbie (eliminated in ep 1), Tally (eliminated ep 1)

No. overall	No. in season	Title	Original release date	US viewers (millions)
10	1	"Who's Hungry"	July 22, 2016	1.16
11	2	"Rep Your City"	July 29, 2016	1.02
12	3	"Fresh to Def"	August 5, 2016	1.16
13	4	"We Don't Take No L's"	August 12, 2016	1.07
14	5	"Run Back to Wifey"	August 19, 2016	0.97
15	6	"Stand Out or Sit Down"	August 26, 2016	1.08
16	7	"Birthday Bash"	September 2, 2016	N/A
17	8	"Battle to the Def"	September 9, 2016	1.24
18	9	"Finale Pt. 1"	September 16, 2016	1.19
19	10	"Finale Pt. 2"	September 23, 2016	1.36

=== Season 3 (2017) ===
This season the contestants were Nova, King Roscoe, Flau'jae, Deetranada, and Tally (Who left the competition in the 12th episode)

No. overall	No. in season	Title	Original release date	US viewers (millions)
20	1	"Look Who's Back"	January 13, 2017	1.11
21	2	"Like a Boss"	January 20, 2017	0.85
22	3	"We Have a Dream"	January 27, 2017	1.04
23	4	"Poncho vs Dashiki"	February 3, 2017	0.97
24	5	"Roll wit It"	February 10, 2017	1.07
25	6	"So Hype!"	February 17, 2017	0.96
26	7	"Fight for Your Spot"	February 24, 2017	1.00
27	8	"You Thought"	March 3, 2017	1.07
28	9	"Dat Way"	March 10, 2017	1.09
29	10	"Shut Up and Train"	March 17, 2017	1.06
30	11	"Full Court Press"	March 24, 2017	1.07
31	12	"Don't Underestimate Nobody"	March 31, 2017	1.18
32	13	"One Contract, One Chain"	April 7, 2017	1.39

=== Season 4 (2017–18) ===
This season the contestants were Street Bud, Lil Bri, Jordan Air Young, Rap-Unzel and Ricci Bitti

No. overall	No. in season	Title	Original release date	US viewers (millions)
33	1	"Don't Mess with Jny"	November 24, 2017	0.68
34	2	"Gettin' Fresh"	December 1, 2017	0.66
35	3	"Catch Fire"	December 8, 2017	TBD
36	4	"Girl, Bye!"	December 15, 2017	TBD
37	5	"4 Lit for Life"	December 29, 2017	TBD
38	6	"Do Ya Dance"	January 5, 2018	TBD
39	7	"Quit Biting My Style"	January 12, 2018	TBD
40	8	"Swag Symphony"	January 19, 2018	0.80
41	9	"I Win"	January 26, 2018	N/A
42	10	"Don't Hold Back"	February 2, 2018	N/A
43	11	"Sweet 16 Showdown"	February 9, 2018	N/A
44	12	"The Press Got U Stressed"	February 16, 2018	N/A
45	13	"There Can Only Be One"	February 23, 2018	N/A

=== Season 5 (2019) ===
Season 5 of The Rap Game premiered on January 11, 2019. Contestants in this season were Tyeler Reign, Eli Triplett, Queen Amayah, Nya Kasan, Sire, and Lil Richye (eliminated after ep 1).

No. overall	No. in season	Title	Original release date	US viewers (millions)
46	1	"Episode 501"	January 10, 2019	N/A
47	2	"Strength, No Weakness"	January 10, 2019	N/A
48	3	"Rhyme or Treason"	January 17, 2019	N/A
49	4	"Indecent Promposal"	January 24, 2019	N/A
50	5	"Style Wars"	February 1, 2019	N/A
51	6	"Def 25"	February 7, 2019	N/A
52	7	"Stay Woke"	February 14, 2019	N/A
53	8	"Fight for Your Life"	February 21, 2019	N/A
54	9	"SuperNova"	February 28, 2019	N/A
55	10	"The Final Battle"	March 7, 2019	N/A

== Winners ==
Winners from Season 1-5
Season	Winner
1	Latto
2	Mani
3	Nova
4	Street Bud
5	Tyeler Reign

== International version ==
A British version called The Rap Game UK hosted by DJ Target, Krept & Konan has aired annually on BBC Three since 23 August 2019.
