= Locked In (mixtape) =

Mixtape by Nemzzz
- Released: September 4, 2026
- Recorded: 2025-2026
- Genres: UK rap; hip-hop
- Length: 35:21
- Producers: Banbwoi; BoysAreRollin; Dee B; Eight8; Farmer; FnZ; Lez; Mirela; Miyabi; Outlaw; Pooh Beatz; Riot; Khaled Rohaim; Saint Patrick; Jared Surien; Tay Keith; TR; Vidorra; Zel

Nemzzz chronology
| From Me 2 U (2025) | Locked In (2026) |

Singles from Locked In
- 1. "Geekin" Released: May 8, 2026; 2. "Killen Em" Released: June 26, 2026; 3. "Prince of the Scene" Released: July 30, 2026; 4. "4AM" Released: August 13, 2026; 5. "Ok" Released: September 4, 2026; 6. "Gass" Released: September 4, 2026

Locked In is the third mixtape by the British rapper Nemzzz. It was self-released on September 4, 2026. The mixtape features guest appearances by Lil Yachty, Cash Cobain, Latto, Travis Scott and Tunde. Locked In reached number 64 on the UK Albums Chart as well as charting in Australia, Belgium, New Zealand and Switzerland. A deluxe edition of the mixtape, dubbed "Euroluxe", was released on November 6, 2026 and featured additional guest appearances from Nono La Grinta, Sosa La M and Artie 5ive.

== Singles ==
The lead single "Geekin", featuring American rapper Lil Yachty, was released on May 8, 2026. "Geekin" peaked at number 11 on the Official Aotearoa Music Charts. As of October 2026 "Geekin" has over 20 million streams on Spotify. A music video was released the same day.

The second single "Killen Em" was released on June 26, 2026 peaking at number 20 on Aotearoa Music Charts. A music video was released the same day. The third single, "Prince of the Scene" was released on July 30, 2026 alongside a music video.

The fourth (and final single prior to release) "4AM" was released on August 13, 2026 accompanied by a music video.

The fifth and sixth single's were released on the same day as Locked In, September 4. The singles were "Ok" featuring Latto and "Gass" featuring Travis Scott. "Ok" peaked at number 18 on the Aotearoa Music Charts whilst "Gass" peaked at number 61 on the UK singles chart, number 13 on the UK Hip Hop and R&B Singles and Albums Charts, number 69 on the Canadian Hot 100 and number 4 on the Aotearoa Music Charts. A music video for "Gass" was released the same day. "Gass" also appears in Grand Theft Auto VI on VCRR (Vice City Rap Radio).

== Track listing ==
Locked In track listing
| No. | Title | Writer(s) | Producer(s) | Length |
|---|---|---|---|---|
| 1. | "4AM" | Nemzzz; Denzel Ugoji | Zel; FnZ | 2:35 |
| 2. | "Today" | Nemzzz | Dee B | 2:03 |
| 3. | "Geekin" (featuring Lil Yachty) | Nemzzz; Miles McCollum | Dee B | 2:32 |
| 4. | "Prince of the Scene" | Nemzzz; Ugoji | Tay Keith; Zel; FnZ; Riot | 1:56 |
| 5. | "Expansion" | Nemzzz; Ugoji | Eight8; Outlaw; Zel^{[a]} | 1:57 |
| 6. | "BRB" | Nemzzz; Ugoji | Zel; FnZ; Farmer | 2:07 |
| 7. | "Trick" (featuring Cash Cobain) | Nemzzz; Cashmere Small | Zel; Mirela | 2:37 |
| 8. | "Hate Me Love Me" | Nemzzz; Mikkel Storleer Eriksen; Tor Erik Hermansen; Shaffer Smith | Dee B | 1:31 |
| 9. | "OK" (featuring Latto) | Nemzzz; Alyssa Stephens; Brian Alexander Morgan; Ugoji; Kurtis McKenzie; Rogét Chahayed | Zel; Pooh Beatz; Saint Patrick; McKenzie^{[c]}; Chahayed^{[c]} | 2:07 |
| 10. | "Get Ready" | Nemzzz; Ugoji | Zel; FnZ | 2:25 |
| 11. | "Gass" (featuring Travis Scott) | Nemzzz; Jacques Webster II; Ugoji | Vidorra; Zel^{[a]}; Jahaan Sweet^{[a]} | 1:56 |
| 12. | "Killin Em" | Nemzzz | Zel; Vidorra | 1:53 |
| 13. | "Clientele" (featuring Tunde) | Nemzzz; Olu Tunde Finni | Tay Keith; Banbwoi | 1:43 |
| 14. | "Captain Hook" | Nemzzz; Ugoji | Zel; TR; Lez; Oliver Zoéga^{[c]} | 2:13 |
| 15. | "Tokyo Drift" | Nemzzz; Ugoji | Zel; BoysAreRollin | 1:47 |
| 16. | "Where Ya Going" | Nemzzz; Ugoji | Zel; FnZ; Miyabi; Khaled Rohaim | 2:01 |
| 17. | "101" | Nemzzz; Ugoji | Zel; Jared Surien | 1:49 |
| Total length: | | | | 35:21 |

Locked In (Euroluxe) track listing
| No. | Title | Writer(s) | Producer(s) | Length |
|---|---|---|---|---|
| 18. | "Locked In" (featuring Nono La Grinta) | Simms; Noé Kasiama; Ugoji; Bjørn-Marius Øverland | Zel; Payday; Str8cash | 2:19 |
| 19. | "Iconic" (featuring Sosa La M) | Simms; Sosa La M; Ugoji; Dominik Patrzek; Nilly Bo | Zel; nilly; Deats | 2:23 |
| 20. | "Money" (featuring Artie 5ive) | Simms; Ivan Barioli; Mulé; Deboni | FnZ | 2:39 |
| Total length: | | | | 42:43 |

=== Notes ===
- ^{^[c]} indicates a co-producer
- ^{^[a]} indicates an additional producer

== Personnel ==
Credits are adapted from Tidal.

=== Musicians ===
- Nemzzz – vocals
- Zel – programming (tracks 1, 4–7, 9, 10, 12, 14–17)
- FnZ – programming (1, 4, 6, 10, 16)
- Dee B – programming (2, 3, 8)
- Lil Yachty – vocals (3)
- Riot – programming (4)
- Tay Keith – programming (4)
- Eight8 – programming (5)
- Outlaw – programming (5)
- Farmer – programming (6)
- Mirela – programming (7)
- Cash Cobain – vocals (7)
- Pooh Beatz – programming (9)
- Saint Patrick – programming (9)
- Latto – vocals (9)
- Vidorra – programming (11, 12)
- Jahaan Sweet – programming (11)
- Travis Scott – vocals (11)
- Banbwoi – programming (13)
- Tay Keith – programming (13)
- Tunde – vocals (13)
- Lez – programming (14)
- TR – programming (14)
- BoysAreRollin – programming (15)
- Khaled Rohaim – programming (16)
- Miyabi – programming (16)
- Jared Surien – programming (17)

=== Technical ===
- Vidorra – engineering (1–6, 8, 9, 11–17)
- Aresh Banaji – engineering (3)
- Brenden Walsh – engineering (7, 15)
- Xavier Daniel – engineering (10)
- Krg – mixing, mastering (1, 2, 4–10, 12–17)
- Bainz – mixing (3)
- Manny Marroquin – mixing (11)
- Ben Hogarth – vocal mixing (9)
- Drew Sliger – mixing assistance (3)
- Francesco Di Giovanni – mixing assistance (11)
- Ramiro Fernandez-Seoane – mixing assistance (11)
- Joe LaPorta – mastering (3, 11)

== Charts ==
Chart performance for Locked In
| Chart (2026) | Peak position |
|---|---|
| Australian Albums (ARIA Charts) | 45 |
| Belgian Albums (Ultratop Flanders) | 165 |
| Dutch Albums (Album Top 100) | 68 |
| New Zealand Albums (RMNZ) | 29 |
| Swiss Albums (Schweizer Hitparade) | 28 |
| UK Albums (Official Charts) | 64 |
