= Issa Party =

2023 single by Latto featuring BabyDrill

Single by Latto featuring BabyDrill
- Released: September 29, 2023
- Genre: Hip hop
- Length: 2:56
- Label: Streamcut; RCA
- Songwriters: Alyssa Stephens; DelQuristo Wilson; Kevin Price; Darryl Clemons Jr.; Juaquin Malphurs; Lexus Lewis; Dankivion Chatman; Randall Hammers; Thomas Lumpkins
- Producers: Go Grizzly; Pooh Beatz

Latto singles chronology
"Peaches & Eggplants (Remix)" (2023)	"Issa Party" (2023)	"Champagne Shit (Remix)" (2023)

BabyDrill singles chronology
"Starstruck" (2023)	"Issa Party" (2023)	"What's the Move?" (2023)

Music video
- "Issa Party" on YouTube

"Issa Party" is a single by American rapper Latto featuring American rapper BabyDrill, released on September 29, 2023. Produced by Go Grizzly and Pooh Beatz, it contains a sample of "Grove St. Party" by Waka Flocka Flame featuring Kebo Gotti.

== Composition ==
The song finds Latto sends warnings to her enemies and people who have been attacking her reputation, referencing certain people without using names, while also rapping about her own success. She interpolates "Grove St. Party" in the chorus. In the second verse, BabyDrill warns others of the actions he will take in retaliation, both in life and on the internet, and also makes a reference to Waka Flocka Flame.

== Critical reception ==
Alexander Cole of HotNewHipHop wrote a positive review of the song, remarking "She has a lot to get off her chest here, and it comes off in her confident flows. BabyDrill provides a solid verse to the song, which helps bolster the entire effort. It is yet another solid track from Latto, who continues to showcase why she is one of the biggest names in the game."

== Music video ==
The music video was released alongside the single. It sees Latto and BabyDrill at a celebration with many women and party favors.
