= Rubi Rose =

American rapper (born 1997)

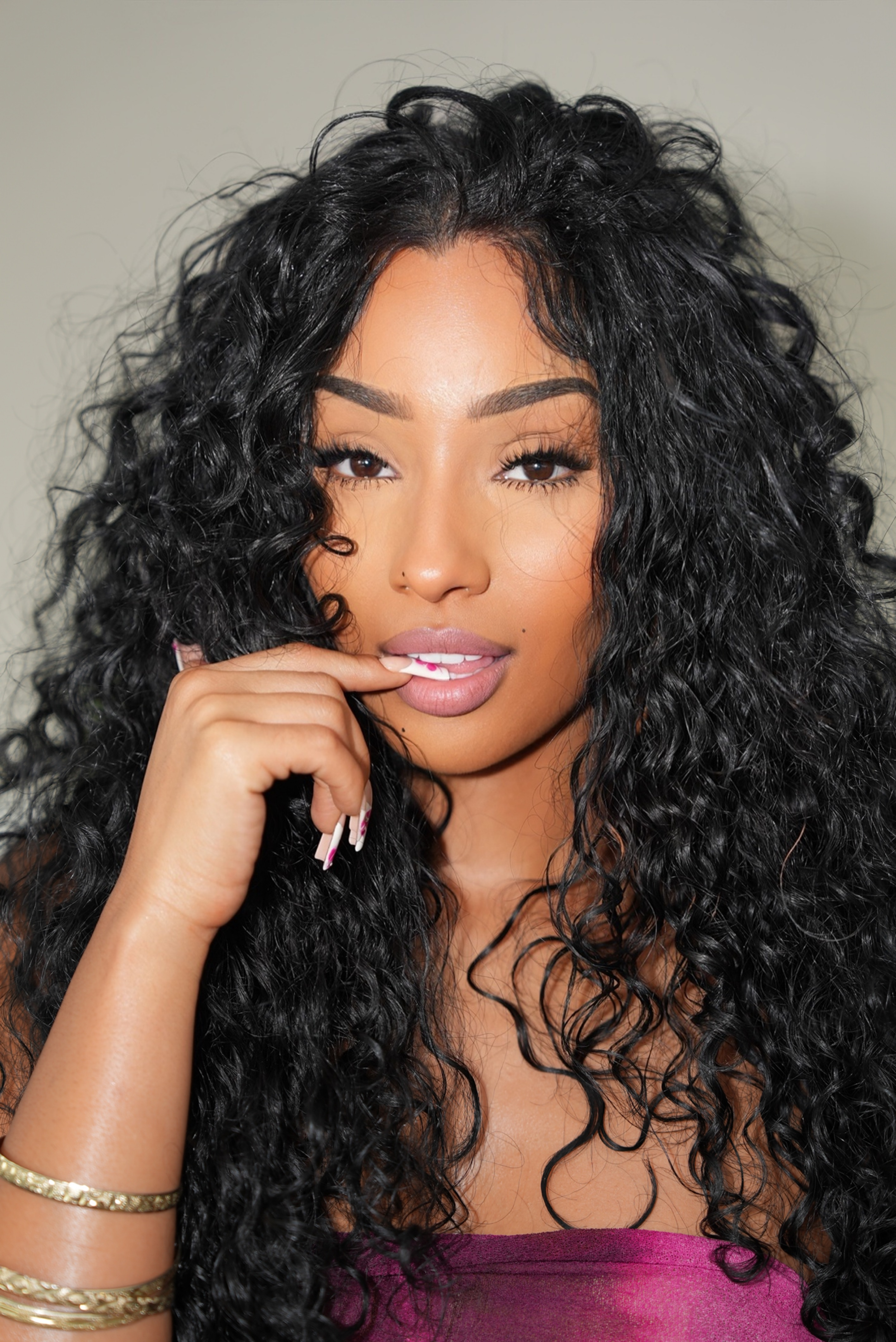
- Rose in 2025
- Born: Rubi Rose Benton; October 2, 1997 (age 29); Lexington, Kentucky, U.S.
- Education: Georgia State University

Rubi Rose Benton (born October 2, 1997) is an American rapper, internet personality and video vixen from Lexington, Kentucky. She first appeared in the music video for “cigarette song” by Raury in 2015, and then the music video for Migos' 2016 single "Bad and Boujee." She then pursued a recording career, first appearing on Playboi Carti's unreleased song, "On Top" in 2018. A number of follow-up singles led up to the release of her debut mixtape, For the Streets (2020) through the label Hitco. Despite lukewarm reception, she gained wider success in her modeling career upon joining the subscription service OnlyFans earlier that year. Rose made a cameo in Cardi B and Megan Thee Stallion's music video for their 2020 single "WAP".

In 2023, Rose signed with Josh Marshall's Mogul Vision, an imprint of Interscope Records, to release the single "Hood Bitch Aesthetic". It is preceding the release of her forthcoming debut studio album.

== Early life ==
Rubi Rose Benton was born on October 2, 1997, in Lexington, Kentucky. Her mother, Nardos Ghebrelul, a dentist, is an Eritrean immigrant born and raised in Ethiopia and her father, John Benton, is a lawyer of half African-American and half-Japanese descent. Benton has an older sister named Scarlette and a younger sister named Coral. She lived for one year in Geneva, Switzerland. She moved to Atlanta, Georgia, in her junior year of high school before studying politics at Georgia State University. She grew up listening to Prince, Michael Jackson, Biggie, Marvin Gaye, and Chaka Khan. She is influenced by Megan Thee Stallion, Cardi B, Future, Nicki Minaj, and Foxy Brown.

== Career ==
Rubi Rose first gained attention from appearing in Migos' music video for their single "Bad and Boujee". She began her musical career in September 2018, with a remix of Playboi Carti's song "On Top". In 2019, Rose gained further traction with her single "Big Mouth". That same year, she was signed by A&R Chris Turner to LA Reid's record label Hitco Entertainment. Rose made a cameo appearance in American rapper Cardi B's music video for her single "WAP", released on August 7, 2020.

On December 25, 2020, Rose released her first official mixtape For the Streets, which contained guest appearances from Future and PartyNextDoor. The mixtape saw generally negative reviews and failed to chart. Rose was selected for the 2021 XXL Annual Freshman List. In 2023, Rose signed to Josh Marshall's label, Mogul Vision, a subsidiary of Interscope Records. On October 13, 2023, Rose released her single, "Hood Bitch Aesthetic." A month later, she served as a supporting act on Sexyy Red's "Hottest Hood Princess" tour. In May 2024, Rose released the single "Deserve To Die".

On October 11, 2024, Rose appeared in the music video for Latto's single "Brokey".

== Discography ==
- For the Streets (2020)
