= Rent's Due =

Soundtrack album by Nemzzz
- Released: 28 March 2025
- Recorded: 2024–2025
- Length: 29:43
- Label: Self-released
- Producers: 24MMY; Andrzxz; Ilykirai; Internxtional; Jay F; jstcap; Kare; Kendox; Lodoni; Macshooter; Nathaniel London; Payday; ProdByNathan; Rambo; Segway; Str8cash; Yakir Sadra; ZEL

Nemzzz chronology
Do Not Disturb (2024)	Rent's Due (2025)	From Me 2 U (2025)

Singles from Rent's Due
- 1. "Cold" Released: 13 February 2025; 2. "Bad Decisions" Released: 6 March 2025

Rent's Due is the second mixtape by British rapper Nemzzz, released independently on 28 March 2025. It features guest appearances from Central Cee and Kyle Richh. The deluxe edition adds additional appearances from D-Block Europe and Chy Cartier. The mixtape debuted at number 6 on the UK Albums Chart.

== Singles ==
The lead single "Cold" was released on 13 February 2025 and charted number 92 on the Official UK Singles Chart, number 36 on the UK Independent Singles Chart and number 19 on the New Zealand Hot 40 Singles. The second and final single "Bad Decisions" was released on 6 March 2025 and charted number 22 on the New Zealand Hot 40 Singles.

== Track listing ==
Rent's Due track listing
No.	Title	Writer(s)	Producer(s)	Length
1.	"Cold"	Nemiah Simms; Denzel Ugoji	ZEL	2:23
2.	"Motion"	Simms; Ugoji; ProdByNathan; Rambo	ZEL; ProdByNathan; Rambo	2:09
3.	"Turks & Caicos"	Simms; Ugoji; ProdByNathan; Rambo	ZEL; ProdByNathan; Rambo	1:53
4.	"DTM"	Simms; Ugoji; Kendox; Yakir Sadra	ZEL; Kendox; Yakir Sadra	2:!5
5.	"Dilemma" (featuring Central Cee)	Simms; Oakley Caesar-Su; Ugoji; ProdByNathan	ZEL; ProdByNathan	2:40
6.	"Miami" (featuring Kyle Richh)	Simms; Henry Fasheun; Ugoji; Ugoji; jstcap; ilykirai; 24MMY	ZEL; jstcap; ilykirai; 24MMY	2:03
7.	"Ego"	Simms; Ugoji; andrzxz	ZEL; andrzxz	1:55
8.	"Sorry"	Simms; Ugoji; Nathaniel London	ZEL; Nathaniel London	1:39
9.	"Bad Gal Riri"	Simms; Ugoji	ZEL	2:15
10.	"BMF"	Simms; Ugoji; Macshooter	ZEL; Macshooter	1:45
11.	"Bad Decisions"	Simms; Ugoji	ZEL	2:19
12.	"Stop It!"	Simms; Ugoji; Kendox	ZEL; Kendox	1:38
13.	"No Detail"	Simms; Ugoji; Kare; Jay F	ZEL; Kare; Jay F	2:24
14.	"Paid"	Simms; Ugoji; Internxtional; Segway	ZEL; Kare; Internxtional; Segway	2:18
Total length:				29:43

Rent's Due (Deluxe) track listing
No.	Title	Writer(s)	Producer(s)	Length
15.	"Taste" (featuring D-Block Europe)	Simms; Adam Williams; Ricky Banton; Ugoji; Nathaniel London; Macshooter	ZEL; Nathaniel London; Macshooter	2:46
16.	"Chant" (featuring Chy Cartier)	Simms; Chy Cartier; Ugoji; Kare	ZEL; Kare	2:07
17.	"OkOk"	Simms; Ugoji; Payday; Str8cash	ZEL; Payday; Str8cash	1:53
18.	"Sample"	Simms; Ugoji; Lorenzo Spadoni	ZEL; Lodoni	2:19
Total length:				38:50

== Charts ==
Chart performance for Rent's Due
Chart (2025)	Peak position
Australian Albums (ARIA)	57
Austrian Albums (Ö3 Austria)	69
Belgian Albums (Ultratop Flanders)	43
Belgian Albums (Ultratop Wallonia)	170
Dutch Albums (Album Top 100)	23
Irish Albums (Official Charts)	38
New Zealand Albums (RMNZ)	25
Portuguese Albums (AFP)	31
Scottish Albums (Official Charts)	7
Swiss Albums (Schweizer Hitparade)	25
UK Albums (Official Charts)	6
UK Independent Albums (Official Charts)	2
UK R&B Albums (Official Charts)	1
