= GOMF =

2026 single by Latto featuring GloRilla

Single by Latto featuring GloRilla

from the album Big Mama
- Released: April 24, 2026
- Genre: Hip-hop
- Length: 2:29
- Label: Streamcut; RCA
- Songwriters: Alyssa Stephens; Gloria Woods; Edward Cooper III; Darryl Clemons; Randall Hammers; DeAndre Way; Abrahim Mustafa
- Producers: Latto; GloRilla; Coupe; Pooh Beatz; Go Grizzly; SupaKaine

Latto singles chronology
"Business and Personal (Intro)" (2026)	"GOMF" (2026)	"Okayyy" (2026)

GloRilla singles chronology
"To the Side" (2026)	"GOMF" (2026)	"Pop Dat Thang (Remix)" (2026)

Music video
- "GOMF" on YouTube

"GOMF" (acronym for "Get Out My Face") is a song by American rapper Latto, released on April 24, 2026 as the third single from her fourth studio album Big Mama. It features American rapper GloRilla and was produced by the artists alongside Coupe, Pooh Beatz, Go Grizzly and SupaKaine. The song contains a sample of "Yahhh!" by Soulja Boy featuring Arab.

== Composition ==
The song contains "heavy and bouncy" production, with a keyboard riff sampled from "Yahhh!". Lyrically, the rappers aggressively respond to criticism and gossip surrounding them, in a confident manner with a focus on independence and self-respect. Latto, who performs the first verse, mocks the rumors about her relationship and her not being from Atlanta; she particularly denies being a "WAG" and claims her partner is "a baller and he shoot", additionally referencing Pac-Man. GloRilla performs midway through the song, starting with an interlude similar to Latto's, in which she addresses the rumors that she does not really go to the gym and has a BBL. In her verse, she describes herself as a "WAG" (in contrast to Latto) and raps about her relationship with basketball player Brandon Ingram.

== Critical reception ==
Tallie Spencer of HotNewHipHop gave a positive review, writing "The chemistry is immediate. Latto's polished delivery balances GloRilla's gritty, Memphis-rooted edge, giving the record a strong back-and-forth dynamic."

== Music video ==
The music video was released alongside the single. Directed by Latto and Hidji, it opens with Soulja Boy interrupting a news reporter. In one scene, Latto is dressed in a tracksuit reading "Big Mama, One Kid" (also showing her cheetah print bra), as a reference to her song "Go Girl" with Summer Walker and Doja Cat. GloRilla is portrayed as a security guard who deals with paparazzi outside Latto's house.

== Charts ==
Chart performance for "GOMF"
Chart (2026)	Peak position
US Billboard Hot 100	90
US Hot R&B/Hip-Hop Songs (Billboard)	28
US Rhythmic Airplay (Billboard)	4
