= Blick Sum =

2024 song by Latto

Single by Latto

from the album Sugar Honey Iced Tea
- Released: January 28, 2025
- Genre: Hip-hop
- Length: 3:11
- Label: Streamcut; RCA
- Songwriters: Alyssa Stephens; Ahmar Bailey; Ariyana Gandia; Ricci Riera
- Producers: EvilNanijae; Kid Hazel; Riera

Latto singles chronology
"Brokey" (2024)	"Blick Sum" (2025)	"Somebody" (2025)

Playboi Carti singles chronology
"Timeless" (2024)	"Blick Sum" (Remix) (2025)	"Rather Lie" (2025)

Music video
- "Blick Sum" on YouTube

"Blick Sum" By Playboi Carti and Latto is a song by American rapper Latto from her third studio album, Sugar Honey Iced Tea (2024). It was produced by EvilNanijae, Kid Hazel, and Ricci Riera. An official remix featuring American rapper Playboi Carti was released on January 28, 2025.

== Content ==
The song is about Latto being sexually attracted to a man that carries a gun around.

== Critical reception ==
Vivian Medithi of Pitchfork commented "When Sugar Honey Iced Tea tries to come across brusque and threatening on would-be Playboi Carti song 'Blick Sum,' it feels silly rather than savage." Elias Andrews of HotNewHipHop stated "The rapper was commended for her rhyming ability and her presence on the mic, and 'Blick Sum' was a perfect example. She carried the menacing song on sheer charisma alone."

== Remix ==
The remix featuring Playboi Carti leaked online in 2024, even before Sugar Honey Iced Tea was released. It was released on January 28, 2025, after Latto teased the collaboration on the previous day. In a newly added second verse, Carti details his interest in firearms, as well as his jewelry (including a chain designed by Johnny Dang) and drug use.

Elias Andrews of HotNewHipHop remarked "The remix might be even better though. While not slapped with the tag of 'remix' on streaming, the new 'Blick Sum' is notable for having a guest verse from one of the most elusive artists in the game. And it's a good one at that." He also described that Playboi Carti "almost sounds like a more severe Danny Brown".

=== Music video ===
An accompanying music video was released alongside the remix. Directed by Hidji World and Gunner Stahl, it shows a neon-lit carousel where scantily-clad dancers in masks dance on the poles. Latto and Playboi Carti rap at the carnival and next to a white Rolls-Royce Cullinan, and show off their cash. Latto also wears a fur coat at the carousel. The clip features a cameo from rapper 2 Chainz.

== Charts ==
Chart performance for "Blick Sum"
Chart (2025)	Peak position
New Zealand Hot Singles (RMNZ)	20
US Bubbling Under Hot 100 (Billboard)	2
US Hot R&B/Hip-Hop Songs (Billboard)	32

== Certifications ==
Certifications for "Blick Sum"
Region	Certification	Certified units/sales
United States (RIAA)	Gold	500,000^{‡}
^{‡} Sales+streaming figures based on certification alone.
