= Lottery (Latto song) =

Single by Latto featuring Lu Kala
- Released: February 17, 2023
- Genre: Disco; pop rap
- Length: 3:06
- Label: Streamcut; RCA
- Songwriters: Alyssa Stephens; Lusamba Vanessa Kalala; Lukasz Gottwald; Rocco Valdes; Gamal Lewis; Steph Jones; Lauren LaRue; Randall Hammers; Badanamu
- Producers: Dr. Luke; Rocco Did It Again!

Latto singles chronology
"Another Nasty Song" (2022)	"Lottery" (2023)	"Put It on da Floor" (2023)

Lu Kala singles chronology
"Pretty Girl Era" (2022)	"Lottery" (2023)	"Hotter Now" (2023)

Music video
- "Lottery" on YouTube

"Lottery" is a song by American rapper Latto featuring Congolese-Canadian singer Lu Kala. It was released as a single on February 17, 2023, through Streamcut and RCA Records.

== Background ==
On January 31, 2023, Latto revealed a snippet of the song with the caption "Pop Latto loading..." on her Instagram. On February 9, she announced its official release date.

== Music and lyrics ==
On the song, Latto claims that "her future partner is so lucky, he’s basically won the lottery." Kala sings about "unwrapping in the sheets and revealing dirty fantasies".

== Critical reception ==
Hayley Hynes of HotNewHipHop gave the song a 'very hottttt' rating. She wrote that "Latto is certainly proving that she’s had no problem carving out her own lane."

Christen Johnson of Cosmopolitan called the song "a feel-good '70s-inspired bad bitch anthem". Steffanee Wang of Nylon described the song as "a glittering, Barbie-pink disco number".

== Music video ==
Director Chandler Lass said that she "wanted to create a world that felt fun, pink, girly, and happy". In the music video, Latto "cruises through Las Vegas in a limousine and hits up a casino before finding herself at a wedding chapel". The music video shows men around her counting and ironing money because she wanted to flip gender roles and show people women can be the boss too.

== Live performances ==
Latto and Kala first performed the song at the Billboard Women in Music event in early March 2023 where Latto won the Powerhouse award presented to her by Chloe Bailey. Latto performed the song herself as part of a medley with "Big Energy" at the iHeartRadio Music Awards in late March 2023 where she tied with GloRilla for the Best New Hip Hop Artist award.

== Commercial performance ==
"Lottery" is Lu Kala's first song to enter the Billboard Hot 100.

== Charts ==
=== Weekly charts ===
2023–2024 chart performance for "Lottery"
Chart (2023–2024)	Peak position
Canada Hot 100 (Billboard)	51
Canada CHR/Top 40 (Billboard)	10
Canada Hot AC (Billboard)	35
Hungary (Dance Top 40)	9
Hungary (Rádiós Top 40)	1
Hungary (Single Top 40)	10
Lithuania Airplay (TopHit)	10
Malta Airplay (Radiomonitor)	10
New Zealand Hot Singles (RMNZ)	32
Poland Airplay (OLiS)	1
Poland Streaming (OLiS)	48
San Marino Airplay (SMRTV Top 50)	36
Slovakia Airplay (ČNS IFPI)	35
Suriname (Nationale Top 40)	7
Turkey International Airplay (Radiomonitor Türkiye)	4
US Billboard Hot 100	83
US Adult Pop Airplay (Billboard)	39
US Dance Airplay (Billboard)	31
US Hot R&B/Hip-Hop Songs (Billboard)	29
US Pop Airplay (Billboard)	19
US Rhythmic Airplay (Billboard)	9

2026 chart performance for "Lottery"
Chart (2026)	Peak position
Romania Airplay (TopHit)	42

=== Monthly charts ===
2024 monthly chart performance
Chart (2024)	Peak position
Lithuania Airplay (TopHit)	25
Slovakia (Rádio Top 100)	43

2026 monthly chart performance
Chart (2026)	Peak position
Romania Airplay (TopHit)	69

=== Year-end charts ===
2023 year-end chart performance for "Lottery"
Chart (2023)	Position
Hungary (Dance Top 40)	84
Hungary (Rádiós Top 40)	8
Poland (Polish Airplay Top 100)	3

2024 year-end chart performance for "Lottery"
Chart (2024)	Position
Hungary (Dance Top 40)	34
Hungary (Rádiós Top 40)	10
Poland (Polish Airplay Top 100)	50

2025 year-end chart performance for "Lottery"
Chart (2025)	Position
Hungary (Dance Top 40)	70
Hungary (Rádiós Top 40)	48
Poland (Polish Airplay Top 100)	94

== Certifications ==
Certifications for "Lottery"
Region	Certification	Certified units/sales
Canada (Music Canada)	Gold	40,000^{‡}
Hungary (MAHASZ)	Gold	2,000^{‡}
Poland (ZPAV)	Platinum	50,000^{‡}
^{‡} Sales+streaming figures based on certification alone.
