= Brokey (song) =

2024 single by Latto

Single by Latto

from the album Sugar Honey Iced Tea
- Released: August 27, 2024
- Genre: Hip-hop; trap
- Length: 3:37
- Label: Streamcut; RCA
- Songwriters: Alyssa Stephens; Edward Cooper III
- Producer: Coupe

Latto singles chronology
| "Big Mama" (2024) | "Brokey" (2024) | "Blick Sum" (2025) |

Music video
- "Brokey" on YouTube

"Brokey" is a song by American rapper Latto from her third studio album, Sugar Honey Iced Tea (2024). Produced by Coupe, it was released as the album's fourth single on August 27, 2024.

== Controversy ==
In the song, Latto boasts her wealthy lifestyle and addresses those who cannot live luxuriously with lyrics such as "Bitches gotta wait 'til they birthday to go out of town." Some took offense at the lyrics, perceiving them as looking down on the working class. On September 15, 2024, Latto wrote in response on X, "I hate that y'all think I was calling hard workers brokeys 💔 so I got $10k for whoever make the best video at they job to brokey & I'll fly u out to be in the music video…no mo waiting til ur bday to go outta town. Tag me & hashtag #Brokey, so I can see them all."

Yadira Ramirez, a former employee at the Waffle House, was fired for participating in the challenge, a day after having submitted a video of her and her co-workers making gestures to the song on the video-sharing app TikTok. Latto awarded Ramirez with the $10,000 prize and posted a video of them dancing to the song.

== Critical reception ==
In his review of Sugar Honey Iced Tea, Steve "Flash" Juon of RapReviews stated "Regrettably a lot of the album sounds more like 'Brokey' than 'Sunday Service.' Latto sells herself short. 'Cook, clean and fuck him right, I'm so heaven sent/What I look like asking him about another bitch?' Maybe she's playing to young men with high T levels, but it still feels demeaning to see her 'serving' other men instead of them 'serving' her." Vivian Medithi of Pitchfork wrote, "Silly isn't a terrible look for Latto, whose simple rhymes are often delivered with an exaggerated wink. Take 'Brokey,' where she says she's sick of Givenchy Shark Lock boots ('Y'all burnt 'em out')"

== Music video ==
An official music video was directed by Laura Marciano and released on October 11, 2024. It opens with comedian Desi Banks sitting inside Latto's cheetah print Lamborghini. He says, "Everything I did for you, and you gon' do me like that? All the massages. The cheetah. I made you a cheetah. I had heart. I may [not have had] money, but I had heart." In another part, rapper Rubi Rose appears in a commercial for women dealing with irresponsible men, saying "Are you tired of your man? Tired of paying bills? Tired of feeling like you're his mama?" before urging them to call the hotline. The clip also features cameos from Yadira Ramirez and Internet personality Alabama Barker

== Charts ==
=== Weekly charts ===
Weekly chart performance for "Brokey"
| Chart (2024–2025) | Peak position |
|---|---|
| US Billboard Hot 100 | 84 |
| US Hot R&B/Hip-Hop Songs (Billboard) | 24 |
| US Rhythmic Airplay (Billboard) | 3 |

=== Year-end charts ===
Year-end chart performance for "Brokey"
| Chart (2025) | Position |
|---|---|
| US Hot R&B/Hip-Hop Songs (Billboard) | 70 |
| US R&B/Hip-Hop Airplay (Billboard) | 16 |
| US Rhythmic Airplay (Billboard) | 26 |

== Certifications ==
Certifications for "Brokey"
| Region | Certification | Certified units/sales |
|---|---|---|
| United States (RIAA) | Gold | 500,000^{‡} |
^{‡} Sales+streaming figures based on certification alone.
