= Somebody (Latto song) =

2025 single by Latto

Single by Latto

from the album Big Mama
- Released: May 16, 2025
- Genre: Pop rap; R&B; trap
- Length: 3:22
- Label: Streamcut; RCA
- Songwriters: Alyssa Stephens; Darryl Clemons; Timothy Mosley; Stephen Garrett; Bryan Yepes; Rex Kudo; BassKid; Jaucquez Lowe; Kevin Price; Bren
- Producers: Pooh Beatz; Go Grizzly; London Jae; Yepes; Kudo; BassKid; Bren

Latto singles chronology
"Blick Sum (Remix)" (2025)	"Somebody" (2025)	"Gyatt" (2025)

Music video
- "Somebody" on YouTube

"Somebody" is a single by American rapper Latto, released on May 16, 2025, as the lead single from her fourth studio album, Big Mama (2026). The lyrics interpolate "Are You That Somebody?" by Aaliyah and it was produced by Pooh Beatz, Go Grizzly, London Jae, Bryan Yepes, Rex Kudo, BassKid and Bren.

== Content ==
In the song, Latto raps over a "vibey, laid-back beat" about finding a person she can love and trust. She interpolates "Are You That Somebody?" on the chorus, crooning "I really need somebody / Tell me you that somebody / I don't care about your bodies / Uh, love the way you touch my body".

== Critical reception ==
Bryson "Boom" Paul of HotNewHipHop stated, "By mixing 90s R&B flavor with her trademark confidence, Latto's evolving — not just as a rapper but as a full-blown artist. 'Somebody' ain't just a single; it's a statement that she can talk slick, talk soft, and still make it bang."

HotNewHipHop ranked the song as the 11th best rap song of 2025.

== Music video ==
The music video was released alongside the single. It was directed by Latto's sister Brooklyn Nikole and shot in Jamaica. The clip sees Latto sunbathing on a bamboo raft in a river, and lounging in the sand, surrounded by tropical scenery and lush greenery. She wears a skimpy bikini and limited-edition rose gold, diamond Cartier Crash watch. The video features a cameo from Jamaican DJ Popcaan, who plays her love interest.

== Charts ==
=== Weekly charts ===
Weekly chart performance for "Somebody"
Chart (2025)	Peak position
New Zealand Hot Singles (RMNZ)	25
US Billboard Hot 100	94
US Hot R&B/Hip-Hop Songs (Billboard)	18
US R&B/Hip-Hop Airplay (Billboard)	11
US Rhythmic Airplay (Billboard)	8

=== Year-end charts ===
Year-end chart performance for "Somebody"
Chart (2025)	Position
US Hot R&B/Hip-Hop Songs (Billboard)	59
US Rhythmic Airplay (Billboard)	50

== Certifications ==
Certifications for "Somebody"
Region	Certification	Certified units/sales
United States (RIAA)	Gold	500,000^{‡}
^{‡} Sales+streaming figures based on certification alone.

== Release history ==
Release dates and formats for "Somebody"
Region	Date	Format(s)	Label(s)	Ref.
Various	May 16, 2025	Digital download; streaming	Streamcut; RCA	
United States	June 10, 2025	Rhythmic contemporary radio	Streamcut; RCA	
