= Big Mama (album) =

Studio album by Latto
- Released: May 29, 2026
- Genre: Hip-hop
- Length: 55:01
- Labels: RCA; Streamcut
- Producers: 21 Savage; BassKid; Bren; Bryvn; Cole; Coupe; Gitty; GloRilla; Go Grizzly; Hardo; Ice Chain; Jake; Kid Hazel; Rex Kudo; Latto; London Jae; MadisonLST; Mikewavvs; The Monsters & Strangerz; Note; Tommy Parker; Pooh Beatz; Plu20 Nash; Will Rice; Romano; Sango; Daniele Sartori; Sexyy Red; Supakaine; Teyana Taylor; Thankyouwill; Wax Roof; Bryan Yepes

Latto chronology
Sugar Honey Iced Tea (2024)	Big Mama (2026)

Singles from Big Mama
- 1. "Somebody" Released: May 16, 2025; 2. "Business and Personal (Intro)" Released: March 20, 2026; 3. "GOMF" Released: April 24, 2026; 4. "Okayyy" Released: August 4, 2026

Big Mama is the fourth studio album by American rapper Latto. It was released through Streamcut and RCA Records on May 29, 2026. The album serves as the follow-up to her 2024 album, Sugar Honey Iced Tea, and was supported by four singles: "Somebody", "Business and Personal (Intro)", "GOMF", and "Okayyy". The album contains guest appearances from GloRilla, Doja Cat, 21 Savage, Sexyy Red, Mariah the Scientist, Odeal, Wizkid, Teyana Taylor, and Jelly Roll.

== Release and promotion ==
The album's lead single, "Somebody", was released on May 16, 2025. The second single, "Business and Personal (Intro)", was released on March 20, 2026, and the same day, Latto announced the album, and that she was pregnant with her first child with rapper, 21 Savage. She released the single "GOMF", featuring GloRilla, on April 24, 2026. On May 8, 2026, Latto announced on X that Big Mama would be her final album. On May 29, she clarified that this was indeed the last album she owed the label and that "I wouldn't say I'm retiring today." "Okayyy", featuring Doja Cat, was released as the fourth single to US rhythmic and urban radio on August 4, 2026.

== Critical reception ==
Professional ratings
Aggregate scores
Source	Rating
Metacritic	76/100
Review scores
Source	Rating
Clash	8/10
NME	4/5 stars
Pitchfork	7.3/10
RapReviews	7/10
Rolling Stone	3.5/5 stars

According to the review aggregator Metacritic, Big Mama received "generally favorable reviews" based on a weighted average score of 76 out of 100 from 5 critic scores.

== Commercial performance ==
Big Mama debuted at number sixteen on the US Billboard 200 and number six on the Top R&B/Hip-Hop Albums charts selling 33,000 album-equivalent units.

== Track listing ==
Big Mama track listing
No.	Title	Writer(s)	Producer(s)	Length
1.	"Business and Personal (Intro)"	Alyssa Stephens; Darryl Clemons; Edward Cooper III; Randall Hammers; MadisonLST; Kevin Price; Will Rice; Kai Wright	Coupe; Go Grizzly; MadisonLST; Pooh Beatz; Sango; Supakaine; Wax Roof	4:19
2.	"Get Money Girl"	Stephens; Cooper; Hammers	Latto; Coupe; Supakaine	3:01
3.	"GOMF" (with GloRilla)	Stephens; Clemons; Cooper; Hammers; Abrahim Mustafa; DeAndre Way; Gloria Woods	Latto; Coupe; GloRilla; Go Grizzly; Pooh Beatz; Supakaine	2:29
4.	"Chrome Heart Diaper Bag"	Stephens; Clemons; Hammers; Price	Latto; Go Grizzly; Pooh Beatz; Supakaine	2:56
5.	"Okayyy" (with Doja Cat)	Stephens; Clemons; Cooper; Amala Diamini; Hammers; Price	Latto; Coupe; Pooh Beatz; Supakaine	3:58
6.	"Hostage" (with 21 Savage)	Stephens; Bin Abraham-Joseph; Cooper; Ernest Isley; O'Kelly Isley; Marvin Isley; Ronald Isley; Rudolph Isley; Christopher Jasper	Latto; 21 Savage; Coupe; Will Rice	3:11
7.	"Death Row"	Stephens; Dallas Austin; Clemons; Cooper; Hammers; Jaucquez Lowe; Price; Gary White	Latto; Coupe; Go Grizzly; London Jae; Pooh Beatz; Supakaine	1:34
8.	"Onnat"	Stephens; Cory Andrews; Ahmar Bailey; Kristopher Bailey; Keenen Ngwenya; Clemons; Hammers; Antwan Patton; Price; Nsilo Reddick; Michael Render; Nicholas Sherwood	Latto; Go Grizzly; Ice Chain; Kid Hazel; Pooh Beatz; Supakaine	2:11
9.	"Gimme Dat"	Stephens; Hammers; Malcolm Lawson-Stribling; Thomas Lumpkins; Carlton Mays Jr.	Latto; Mikewavvs; Note; Tommy Parker; Plu20 Nash; Supakaine	4:01
10.	"Fallin'"	Stephens; Cooper; Hammers; William Lambert	Latto; Coupe; Supakaine; Thankyouwill	3:08
11.	"Need Luv 2" (with Sexyy Red)	Stephens; A. Bailey; Joseph Barnett; Hammers; Jake; Lowe; Janae Wherry	Latto; Hardo; Jake; Kid Hazel; London Jae; Sexyy Red; Supakaine	2:54
12.	"Make Me" (with Mariah the Scientist)	Stephens; Cooper	Coupe	3:22
13.	"Naked"	Stephens; Clemons; Harold Duncan; Hammers; Gary Hill; Lakeem Mattox; Terrell Perry; Price; Rico; Donquez Woods	Latto; Go Grizzly; Pooh Beatz; Supakaine	2:41
14.	"Anxious" (with Odeal and Wizkid)	Stephens; Ayodeji Balogun; Clemons; Cole; Hammers; Price; Hillary Udanoh	Cole; Go Grizzly; Pooh Beatz	3:47
15.	"4L" (with Teyana Taylor)	Stephens; Clemons; Hammers; Price; Romano; Daniele Sartori; Teyana Taylor	Latto; Go Grizzly; Pooh Beatz; Romano; Sartori; Supakaine; Taylor	2:28
16.	"Daddy's Girl Interlude"	Stephens; Melissa Elliott; Hammers; Tim Mosley	Latto; Supakaine	2:36
17.	"Mama" (with Jelly Roll)	Stephens; Nija Charles; Clemons; Jason DeFord; Jeff Gitelman; Jordan K. Johnson; Stefan Johnson; Michael Pollack; Price	Latto; Coupe; Gitty; Go Grizzly; The Monsters & Strangerz; Pooh Beatz; Supakaine	3:03
18.	"Somebody"	Stephens; BassKid; Bren; Clemons; Stephen Garrett; Rex Kudo; Lowe; Mosley; Price; Bryan Yepes	BassKid; Bren; Bryvn; Go Grizzly; Kudo; London Jae; Pooh Beatz; Yepes	3:22
Total length:				55:01

=== Notes ===
- “Make Me”, “Anxious”, & “Mama” are omitted on the physical versions of the album
- Physical versions omit Doja Cat on “Okayyy”

== Personnel ==
Credits are adapted from Tidal.

- Latto – performance
- Ben Hogarth – engineering (all tracks), mixing (tracks 1–17)
- Joe LaPorta – mastering
- Jess Jackson – mixing (3)
- NealHPogue – mixing (18)

== Charts ==
Chart performance for Big Mama
Chart (2026)	Peak position
Nigerian Albums (TurnTable)	56
US Billboard 200	16
US Top R&B/Hip-Hop Albums (Billboard)	6
