= Kidwild =

British rapper and songwriter (born 2005)

- Born: Keaton Edmund; December 12, 2005 (age 20); Newham, East London, England
- Origin: London, England
- Genre: UK rap • British hip hop • UK drill
- Occupation: Rapper • songwriter • actor
- Years active: 2021–present
- Label: Independent (formerly Atlantic Records)

Kidwild, born Keaton Edmund in 2005, is a British rapper and songwriter from Newham, East London. He began his career as a child actor, appearing in West End productions and the CBBC drama Jamie Johnson, before pursuing music during the COVID-19 pandemic. He gained attention with his music and later signed a record deal with Atlantic Records at the age of 17. After the deal ended, he continued his career independently. His music is characterized by introspective lyrics and drill-influenced production, with themes including personal struggles, ambition and emotional vulnerability.
