= The Biggest =

2021 single by Latto

Single by Latto
- Released: May 21, 2021
- Genre: Hip hop
- Length: 2:23
- Label: Streamcut; RCA

Latto singles chronology
"Beat Box (Big Latto Mix)" (2021)	"The Biggest" (2021)	"Big Energy" (2021)

"The Biggest" is a song recorded by American rapper Latto. It was released as a single on May 21, 2021, through RCA and Streamcut.

== Background and release ==
"The Biggest" was teased and eventually announced following the change of Latto's stage name from Mulatto to Latto. She changed her stage name due to criticism for using the stage name Mulatto, as the word mulatto is used as a racial classification and some people felt she was glorifying the word by using it in her stage name....

"Mulatto was a negative term that I was trying to make positive. We’re gonna start positive, and I feel like that’s gonna bring that energy my way. I feel like, in a way, that could’ve been holding me back, and I don’t want to attach that to myself anymore…"

— Latto

Latto also addressed claims that she was too slow to change her stage name, stating that she had to involve "management, PR, investors, social media, [and] lawyers" in the change. "The Biggest" was released on May 21, 2021.

== Composition ==
In "The Biggest", Latto raps about fame. She says in the song that she "can't be bullied by the public". The song was produced by Supah Mario and Akachi.

== Music video ==
A music video for "The Biggest" was released alongside the song.
