= Pussy (Latto song) =

Single by Latto
- Released: July 15, 2022
- Length: 2:21
- Label: Streamcut; RCA
- Composers: Clarence Henry Reid; Johnny Goldstein; Willie Clark
- Lyricist: Alyssa Stephens
- Producer: Johnny Goldstein

Latto singles chronology
"I Just Called" (2022)	"Pussy" (2022)	"For the Night" (2022)

Music video
- "Pussy" on YouTube

"Pussy" is a song by American rapper Latto. It was released on July 15, 2022, through Streamcut Media and RCA Records.

== Background and release ==
BIG LATTO 🎰
(@Latto)
tweeted:

I actually am donating proceeds.. Yall be the same ones saying “why u gotta post everything” if I do & assume I’m not doing it if I don’t post it lol however I AM using my power (platform) to make a change regardless shut yo fake woke ass up what are YOU doing???

July 13, 2022

In March 2022, Latto released her second album, 777. She announced the upcoming release of "Pussy" on July 13, through Twitter, revealing that the song would be released two days later, on Friday. Shortly afterward, she defended herself in response to tweets claiming she was taking advantage of the overturning of Roe v. Wade to further her career. TMZ sarcastically commented that "apparently, a rapper speaking on social... issues is... a wild concept for some people". A portion of the song's proceeds are to be donated to Planned Parenthood, an organization which seeks to uphold abortion rights.

== Cover art ==
The cover artwork for "Pussy" shows hot, pink lava spewing from a vagina, which forms the song title in a stylized typeface, behind the White House. The image was designed by Katie McIntyre, who said that the "cover is all about the rise of the collective feminine against opposing forces".

== Composition ==
"Pussy" samples the 1968 song "Girls Can't Do What the Guys Do" by R&B singer Betty Wright, who died in 2020.

"Pussy" has been described as a "protest song", a "female-empowering anthem", "defiant", and a "diss track". In the song, Latto derides misogynists. In its first verse, she questions men who "try to police" abortion around the world. She also speaks about double standards that women face when embracing their sexuality.

== Critical reception ==
Ashley Pointer of NPR wrote that Latto's "bars cut through sharper than a sword".

The Musical Hype gave the song 4 out of 5 stars. He wrote that the song is a "winner" even if it is profane.

== Music video ==
The music video for "Pussy" was directed by Sara Lacombe and includes clips from protests relating to the overturning of Roe v. Wade. In the video, Latto raps the lyrics while surrounded by cats. Lacombe stated that "this video is symbolic that we can be both hard (her lyrics) and soft (the world we placed her in) at the same time."

Dora Segall of Spin called the video "excellent" and "unexpectedly adorable".

== Awards and nominations ==
Awards and nominations for "Pussy"
Year	Ceremony	Category	Result	Ref.
2022	BET Hip Hop Awards	Impact Track	Nominated	
2022	MTV Europe Music Awards	Video for Good	Nominated	
2022	MTV Video Music Awards	Video for Good	Nominated	

== Personnel ==
Credits adapted from Spotify.

- Alyssa Stephens – performer, songwriter
- Johnny Goldstein – producer, songwriter
- Clarence Henry Reid – songwriter
- Willie Clark – songwriter
