= Put It on da Floor =

2023 single by Latto

Single by Latto

from the album Sugar Honey Iced Tea
- Released: April 21, 2023
- Genre: Dirty rap; crunk
- Length: 3:01
- Label: Streamcut; RCA
- Songwriters: Alyssa Stephens; Kevin Price
- Producers: Go Grizzly; Squat; Pooh Beatz

Latto singles chronology
"Lottery" (2023)	"Put It on da Floor" (2023)	"Put It on da Floor Again" (2023)

Music video
- "Put It on da Floor" on YouTube

"Put It on da Floor" is a song by American rapper Latto from her third studio album, Sugar Honey Iced Tea (2024). It was released on April 21, 2023, through Streamcut and RCA Records as the album's lead single. It was produced by Go Grizzly, Squat Beatz, and Pooh Beatz. An official remix of the song featuring American rapper Cardi B titled "Put It on da Floor Again" was released on June 2, 2023, which was also included on the album. Although the single initially did not chart, the remix debuted at number 13 on the US Billboard Hot 100 and was certified double platinum by the Recording Industry Association of America (RIAA).

== Content ==
In the song, Latto raps about being tired of people criticizing and being sneaky, warning her detractors to not cause trouble for her, and boasts her wealth. In the chorus, she raps: "I done done it all / feel like Shawty Lo / Laughin' to the bank / but shit is not a joke / Say she got a problem? / Imaginary smoke / Bitches said it's up / then put it on the floor".

== Controversy ==
Latto references fellow rapper Coi Leray in the opening of the second verse: "Smokin' on that gas, blunt big as Coi Leray". Shortly after the song was released on streaming services, Leray responded with a series of tweets, taking issue with the lyrics and accusing Latto of body shaming her. However, Leray later stated in a tweet that she may have overreacted and went on to warn Latto not to mention her name in a song again. During Weekend Two of Coachella 2023, Latto said at the end of her set, "Ay, Coi Leray I love your body baby."

== Music video ==
Latto first performed the song at Coachella, several days before it was released. The music video was released on April 24, 2023, including clips of her Coachella performance.

== Charts ==
Chart performance for "Put It on da Floor"
Chart (2023)	Peak position
US Bubbling Under Hot 100 (Billboard)	25
US Hot R&B/Hip-Hop Songs (Billboard)	43

== Certifications ==
Certifications for "Put It on da Floor"
Region	Certification	Certified units/sales
Canada (Music Canada)	Gold	40,000^{‡}
^{‡} Sales+streaming figures based on certification alone.

== Put It on da Floor Again ==
"Put It on da Floor Again"

Single by Latto featuring Cardi B

from the album Sugar Honey Iced Tea
- Released: June 1, 2023
- Genre: Dirty rap; crunk
- Length: 3:05
- Label: Streamcut; RCA
- Songwriters: Alyssa Stephens; Belcalis Almanzar; Born Immaculate
- Producers: Go Grizzly; Squat; Pooh Beatz

Latto singles chronology
"Put It on da Floor" (2023)	"Put It on da Floor Again" (2023)	"Seven" (2023)

Cardi B singles chronology
"Tomorrow 2" (2022)	"Put It on da Floor Again" (2023)	"Point Me 2" (2023)

Music video
- "Put It on da Floor Again" on YouTube

"Put It on da Floor Again" is the official remix of "Put It on da Floor" by Latto with American rapper Cardi B, released on June 1, 2023 through Streamcut and RCA Records. "Put It on da Floor Again" peaked at number 13 on the Billboard Hot 100, marking Latto's second and Cardi B's 20th top-20 hit, and was certified double platinum by the Recording Industry Association of America (RIAA). The remix was included on Latto's third studio album, Sugar Honey Iced Tea (2024).

=== Background ===
On May 31, 2023, Latto announced the official remix of the song on Twitter, revealing it would feature Cardi B. The remix, titled "Put It on da Floor Again", was released on June 1, 2023.

=== Composition ===
Cardi B performs the second verse, in which she takes aim at her haters and critics ("I ain't smokin' on no za', lil' bitch, I'm smokin' on you / Put your bestie in a pack and now I'm smokin' her too / I been ballin' so damn hard, could've went to LSU, huh / Got so many chains on, I can't even see my throat"), and says she is always "doing the most". She also declares, "I'm sexy dancin' in the house, I feel like Britney Spears", referencing the singer's dance videos on Instagram.

=== Critical reception ===
The remix was well-received. Tom Breihan of Stereogum wrote, "Cardi matches and then exceeds Latto's energy. Once again, Cardi is endlessly quotable". Brycen Saunders of Hypebeast wrote, "By bringing Cardi B on board, the track receives an extra dose of high-caliber rap energy – putting on for the growing strength of woman rap."

=== Music video ===
A music video was released alongside the remix. It sees Latto and Cardi B causing mischief, twerking and showing their riches in a number of stores, including a convenience store, grocery store, and jewelry store, and at a house party. They are also seen toasting 1800 Tequila Cristalino. Cardi B wears a cutout black playsuit emblazoned with "I feel like Britney Spears" in green text. The video features cameos from rappers Offset and BabyDrill and LSU Tigers women's basketball player Angel Reese.

=== Awards and nominations ===
Awards and nominations for "Put It on da Floor Again"
Year	Ceremony	Category	Result	Ref.
2023	BET Hip Hop Awards	Song of the Year	Nominated	
2023	BET Hip Hop Awards	Best Hip Hop Video	Nominated	
2023	BET Hip Hop Awards	Best Collaboration	Nominated	
2023	BET Hip Hop Awards	Best Featured Verse	Nominated	

=== Charts ===
==== Weekly charts ====
Weekly chart performance for "Put It on da Floor Again"
Chart (2023)	Peak position
Global 200 (Billboard)	66
New Zealand Hot Singles (RMNZ)	36
US Billboard Hot 100	13
US Hot R&B/Hip-Hop Songs (Billboard)	6
US R&B/Hip-Hop Airplay (Billboard)	3
US Rhythmic Airplay (Billboard)	2

==== Year-end charts ====
Year-end chart performance for "Put It on da Floor Again"
Chart (2023)	Position
US Billboard Hot 100	98
US Hot R&B/Hip-Hop Songs (Billboard)	29
US Rhythmic (Billboard)	26

=== Certifications ===
Certifications for "Put It on da Floor Again"
Region	Certification	Certified units/sales
United States (RIAA)	2× Platinum	2,000,000^{‡}
^{‡} Sales+streaming figures based on certification alone.
