= Sugar Honey Iced Tea =

Studio album by Latto
- Released: August 9, 2024
- Recorded: 2023–2024
- Genres: Hip-hop; R&B; trap; crunk
- Length: 62:00
- Labels: Streamcut; RCA
- Producers: 9am; Bankroll Got It; Coupe; Daoud; Derrick Milano; Dougie F; Dun Deal; Earl on the Beat; EJ Stellar; EvilNanijae; Go Grizzly; Inkredibeatz; Jean-Baptiste; JetsonMade; Jonas Jeberg; Kid Hazel; Kid Masterpiece; Oz; Pooh Beatz; Ricci Riera; Saint Mino; Squat; the Stereotypes; Supakaine; Tommy Parker

Latto chronology
777 (2022)	Sugar Honey Iced Tea (2024)	Big Mama (2026)

Singles from Sugar Honey Iced Tea
- 1. "Put It on da Floor" Released: April 21, 2023; 2. "Sunday Service" Released: February 9, 2024; 3. "Big Mama" Released: June 28, 2024; 4. "Brokey" Released: August 27, 2024; 5. "Blick Sum" Released: January 28, 2025

Sugar Honey Iced Tea is the third studio album by American rapper Latto. It was released through Streamcut and RCA Records on August 9, 2024. The album's standard edition features guest appearances from Young Nudy, Hunxho, Coco Jones, Megan Thee Stallion, Ciara, Mariah the Scientist, Teezo Touchdown, Cardi B, and Flo Milli, but the bonus edition includes Playboi Carti. It serves as the follow-up to her second studio album, 777 (2022).

The album received generally positive reviews, and tied 777 as her highest-charting album on the US Billboard 200, debuting at number fifteen. It was supported by five singles: "Put It on da Floor", "Sunday Service", "Big Mama", "Brokey", and "Blick Sum".

== Promotion ==
On June 22, 2024, Latto first teased the title of the album, while performing as a headliner at the Birthday Bash ATL 2024. On July 24, she announced the release date of the album with a trailer video inspired by the film, ATL (2006), featuring cameos from fellow Atlanta-native rappers 2 Chainz and T.I. On July 26, she previewed the tracklist of the album with a picture of her left hand covering a piece of paper showing a possible tracklist with only a few songs revealed, one of which is the previously released single, "Big Mama". She revealed the cover art of the album on July 30. She shared the full tracklist on August 7.

=== Singles ===
"Put It on da Floor" was released as the album's lead single on April 21, 2023. The official remix, titled "Put It on da Floor Again", featuring American rapper Cardi B, was released on June 1. The remix peaked at number 13 on the Billboard Hot 100 chart. "Sunday Service" was released the album's second single on February 9, 2024. The official remix of the song, featuring American rappers Megan Thee Stallion and Flo Milli, was released on June 7. The song peaked at number 100 on the Billboard Hot 100 chart. The album's third single, titled "Big Mama", was released on June 28 alongside a music video. The song peaked at number 92 on the Billboard Hot 100 chart. A music video for "Georgia Peach" was released on August 9, 2024. A music video for "Brokey" was released on October 11, 2024. "Blick Sum" was released as the album's fifth single on January 28, 2025 alongside a music video; the single version features Playboi Carti.

On the album's one year anniversary, Latto released a music video for "Chicken Grease" and announced a vinyl release of the album.

=== Tour ===
On August 14, 2024, Latto announced the North American dates of the "Sugar Honey Iced Tea Tour", with Mariah the Scientist and Karrahboo as supporting acts. The North American leg of the tour began on October 26, 2024 in Tampa, Florida and concluded on December 7, 2024 in Denver, Colorado. She announced the dates for the European leg of the tour in April 2025. The leg began on June 7, 2025 in St. Paul's Bay and concluded on July 6, 2025 in Liège. The African leg of the tour is planned to take place in Winter 2025.

== Critical reception ==
Professional ratings
Aggregate scores
Source	Rating
Metacritic	72/100
Review scores
Source	Rating
AllMusic	4/5 stars
Clash	7/10
Pitchfork	6.1/10
Rolling Stone	3.5/4 stars

According to the review aggregator Metacritic, Sugar Honey Iced Tea received "generally favorable reviews" based on a weighted average score of 72 out of 100 from 5 critic scores.

Writing for Clash in a positive review, Robin Murray stated that "Sugar Honey Iced Tea paints in the finer details", describing the project as "a work of complexity that – when it clicks into place – might be her most potent release yet". Rolling Stone's Mankaprr Conteh wrote that the album is "a careful ode to her Atlanta roots and life in the south broadly". Conteh praised how Latto's "top-notch bars flow through super smooth sequencing". Concluding her review, Conteh stated that "Latto shows she's more than a sex symbol" and that she's "charismatic, dexterous, and long prepared". On the other hand, Vivian Medithi of Pitchfork wrote that Latto's "Southern charm gets lost in an abundance of anonymous beats". AllMusic's review stated that Latto was "stepping up significantly from the sometimes personality-light commercial sounds of her earlier work" on the album.

== Commercial performance ==
In the United States, Sugar Honey Iced Tea debuted at number fifteen on the Billboard 200 and number two on the Top R&B/Hip-Hop Albums chart, marking her highest peak on the chart with 29,000 album-equivalent units.

== Track listing ==
Sugar Honey Iced Tea track listing
No.	Title	Lyrics	Music	Producer(s)	Length
1.	"Georgia Peach"	Alyssa Stephens; Jocelyn A. Donald; Randall Hammers	Darryl Clemons; Miranda Ferguson; Tommy Lumpkins; Kevin Price; Detral Treadwell	Go Grizzly; Pooh Beatz; Tommy Parker	2:27
2.	"Big Mama"	Stephens	Elliott Archer; Edward Cooper III; Duane Ewell; Jeff Franzel; Edmond Harrison; Ozan Yildirim	Coupe; Oz; Kid Masterpiece; Go Grizzly^{[a]}; Pooh Beatz^{[a]}	2:53
3.	"Blick Sum"	Stephens	Ahmar Bailey; Ariyana Gandia; Ricci Riera	EvilNanijae; Kid Hazel; Riera	3:11
4.	"Settle Down"	Stephens; Donald	Clemons; Tahj Morgan; Price	Go Grizzly; JetsonMade; Pooh Beatz	2:42
5.	"Shrimp & Grits" (featuring Young Nudy)	Stephens; Quantavious T. Thomas	Clemons; Price	Go Grizzly; Pooh Beatz	2:44
6.	"There She Go"	Stephens	Ernest Adams; Clemons; Mike Jones; Price; Salih Williams	EJ Stellar; Go Grizzly; Pooh Beatz	2:41
7.	"Brokey"	Stephens	Stephens; Cooper	Coupe	3:37
8.	"Mimi Interlude"	Stephens	Stephens; Lumpkins	Parker	0:38
9.	"H&M"	Stephens	Derrick Gray; Hammers; Jonas Jeberg; Dazmiere Johnson	Derrick Milano; Jeberg; Supakaine	2:26
10.	"Copper Cove" (featuring Hunxho)	Stephens; Ibrahim Dodo	Clemons; Price	Go Grizzly; Pooh Beatz	3:26
11.	"Ear Candy" (featuring Coco Jones)	Stephens; Kasey Sims; Courtney Jones	Clemons; David Cunningham; Price; Atia Boggs	Dun Deal; Go Grizzly; Inkredibeatz; Pooh Beatz	3:15
12.	"Liquor"	Stephens	Stephens; Isaac Bynum; Clemons; Hammers; Jean-Baptiste Kouame; Price	Earl on the Beat; Go Grizzly; Jean-Baptiste; Supakaine	3:03
13.	"Squeeze" (featuring Megan Thee Stallion)	Stephens; Kameron Glasper; Hammers; Megan Pete	Jeff Baranowski; Luke Milano; Jeremy Reeves; Ray Romulus; Jonathan Yip	9am; The Stereotypes	2:44
14.	"Good 2 You" (featuring Ciara)	Stephens; Donald; Hammers; Ciara Harris	André Benjamin; Luther Campbell; Clemons; David Hobbs; Price; Fletcher Redd; Mark Ross; K. Sims; Christopher Wongwon	Go Grizzly; Pooh Beatz	3:09
15.	"Look What You Did" (featuring Mariah the Scientist)	Stephens; Mariah Buckles; Donald	Daoud Anthony; Clemons; Boggs; Price	Daoud; Go Grizzly; Inkredibeatz; Pooh Beatz	2:58
16.	"Prized Possession" (featuring Teezo Touchdown)	Stephens; Aaron Thomas	Anthony; Clemons; Douglas Ford; Price; Yildirim	Daoud; Dougie F; Go Grizzly; Oz; Pooh Beatz; Andrew Keller^{[v]}	3:41
17.	"S/O to Me"	Stephens	Stephens; Cooper; Daniel Esguerra; Mino Drerup	Coupe; Saint Mino	4:02

Sugar Honey Iced Tea bonus tracks
No.	Title	Lyrics	Music	Producer(s)	Length
18.	"Put It on da Floor"	Stephens; Hammers	Born Immaculate; Clemons; John Norris III; Price; Julius Rivera III; Richard Sims; Broderick Thompson-Smith; Carlos Walker	Go Grizzly; Pooh Beatz; Squat	3:02
19.	"Put It on da Floor Again" (featuring Cardi B)	Stephens; Belcalis Almanzar; Hammers	Born Immaculate; Clemons; Norris; Price; R. Sims; Thompson-Smith; Walker	Go Grizzly; Squat; Pooh Beatz	3:05
20.	"Sunday Service"	Stephens; Hammers	Joel Banks; Taylor Banks; Clemons; Price	Bankroll Got It; Go Grizzly; Pooh Beatz	2:46
21.	"Sunday Service" (remix featuring Megan Thee Stallion and Flo Milli)	Stephens; Hammers; Pete; Tamia Carter	J. Banks; T. Banks; Clemons; Hammers; Price	Bankroll Got It; Go Grizzly; Pooh Beatz	3:27
Total length:					62:00

Sugar Honey Iced Tea CD edition and digital special edition
No.	Title	Lyrics	Music	Producer(s)	Length
18.	"Chicken Grease"	Stephens	Aldrin Davis; Clifford Harris; Steven Dingle; Thomas Heinz Kessler	Romani; Explosive	2:41
Total length:					64:41

Sugar Honey Iced Tea 2025 reissue
No.	Title	Lyrics	Music	Producer(s)	Length
18.	"Chicken Grease"	Stephens	Davis; Harris; Dingle; Kessler	Romani; Explosive	2:41
23.	"Blick Sum" (featuring Playboi Carti)	Stephens	Bailey; Gandia; Riera; Jordan Carter	EvilNanijae; Kid Hazel; Riera	3:12
Total length:					67:53

=== Notes ===
- ^{^[a]} signifies an additional producer
- ^{^[v]} signifies a vocal producer
- All tracks listed as bonus tracks on Sugar Honey Iced Tea are listed under a second disk on digital services.

== Personnel ==
=== Disc 1 ===
Musicians

- Latto – vocals
- The Stereotypes – programming (track 13)
  - Jeremy Reeves – background vocals, bass
  - Jonathan Yip – background vocals, synthesizer
  - Ray Romulus – background vocals, percussion
  - Ray Charles McCullough II
- 3onawav – background vocals (track 13)
- Kameron Glasper – background vocals (track 13)
- Jeff Baranowski – drums (track 13)
- Luke Milano – keyboards (track 13)
- Saint Mino – keyboards (track 17)
- Julius – vocals (track 17)

Technical

- Joe LaPorta – mastering
- Ben Hogarth – mixing, engineering
- Leslie Brathwaite – mixing (track 13)
- Kyle Kashiwagi – engineering (track 13)
- Ronald "RD" Estrada – engineering (track 13)
- Shawn "Source" Jarrett – engineering (track 13)
- Andrew Keller – vocal engineering (track 16)

=== Disc 2 ===
- Latto – vocals
- Sage Skolfield – mastering, mixing (1, 2)
- Jaycen Joshua – mastering, mixing (3)
- Joe LaPorta – mastering (track 4)
- Ben Hogarth – mixing (track 4), engineering (1–3)
- Leslie Brathwaite – mixing (track 4)
- Javier Valverde – engineering (tracks 3, 4)
- Mike Seaberg – engineering (tracks 3, 4)
- Shawn "Source" Jarrett – engineering (track 4)
- Chris Bhikoo – engineering assistance (track 4)
- Christopher Weaver – engineering assistance (track 4)
- Dominique "Cookisdope" Cook – engineering assistance (track 4)
- Maysin Sexton – engineering assistance (track 4)

== Charts ==
=== Weekly charts ===
Weekly chart performance for Sugar Honey Iced Tea
Chart (2024)	Peak position
US Billboard 200	15
US Top R&B/Hip-Hop Albums (Billboard)	2

=== Year-end charts ===
Year-end chart performance for Sugar Honey Iced Tea
Chart (2024)	Position
US Top R&B/Hip-Hop Albums (Billboard)	80

== Certifications ==
Certifications and sales for Sugar Honey Iced Tea
Region	Certification	Certified units/sales
United States (RIAA)	Gold	500,000^{‡}
^{‡} Sales+streaming figures based on certification alone.
