= Big Mama (song) =

2024 single by Latto

Single by Latto

from the album Sugar Honey Iced Tea
- Released: June 28, 2024
- Genre: R&B; trap
- Length: 2:54
- Label: Streamcut; RCA
- Songwriter: Alyssa Stephens
- Producers: Coupe; Oz; Kid Masterpiece

Latto singles chronology
"Sunday Service" (remix) (2024)	"Big Mama" (2024)	"Brokey" (2024)

Music video
- "Big Mama" on YouTube

"Big Mama" is a song by American rapper Latto from her third studio album, Sugar Honey Iced Tea (2024). It was released on June 28, 2024, through Streamcut and RCA Records, and was produced by Coupe, Oz, and Kid Masterpiece. The song features Latto employing a rap-singing style and contains lyrics about her romantic relationship, boasting about their love while addressing women who may challenge it. "Big Mama" received a nomination for the Grammy Award for Best Melodic Rap Performance at the 67th Annual Grammy Awards.

== Composition ==
The first half of the song finds Latto sing-rapping about a man she is in love with and their relationship, from her feelings of insecurity to strong affection. She follows an R&B-styled verse and uses delivery resembling Drake's. The beat switches halfway through the song, in which she adopts the flow of rapper 21 Savage (who she is in a relationship with), lyrically boasting her appealing qualities and dismissing her rivals as being one-dimensional while still bragging about her boyfriend.

== Music video ==
The music video was released alongside the single. It opens with Latto and her sister Brooklyn Nikole deciding to travel to Miami, and preparing and packing for the trip. In Miami, they cruise the streets in luxury cars, dance and twerk on a yacht, go dining and visit a strip club, along with other women.

== Live performances ==
Latto performed the song at the BET Awards 2024, along with her song "Sunday Service".

== Accolades ==
Awards and nominations for "Big Mama (song)"
Organization	Year	Category	Result	Ref.
Grammy Awards	2025	Best Melodic Rap Performance	Nominated	

== Charts ==
=== Weekly charts ===
Weekly chart performance for "Big Mama"
Chart (2024)	Peak position
US Billboard Hot 100	92
US Hot R&B/Hip-Hop Songs (Billboard)	23

=== Year-end charts ===
2024 year-end chart performance for "Big Mama"
Chart (2024)	Position
US Hot R&B/Hip-Hop Songs (Billboard)	97

== Certifications ==
Certifications for "Big Mama"
Region	Certification	Certified units/sales
United States (RIAA)	Gold	500,000^{‡}
^{‡} Sales+streaming figures based on certification alone.
