= Sunday Service =

2024 single by Latto

Single by Latto

from the album Sugar Honey Iced Tea
- Released: February 9, 2024
- Recorded: 2024
- Genre: Crunk&B
- Length: 2:46
- Label: Streamcut; RCA
- Songwriters: Alyssa Stephens; Kevin Price; Darryl Clemons
- Producers: Go Grizzly; Pooh Beatz; Bankroll Got It

Latto singles chronology
"Can't Get Enough" (remix) (2024)	"Sunday Service" (2024)	"Big Mama" (2024)

Music videos
- "Sunday Service" on YouTube; "Sunday Service" (remix) on YouTube

Remix cover
- Cover art of the official remix featuring Megan Thee Stallion and Flo Milli.

"Sunday Service" is a song by American rapper Latto from her third studio album, Sugar Honey Iced Tea (2024). It was released on February 9, 2024, through Streamcut and RCA Records as the album's second single. Produced by Go Grizzly, Pooh Beatz, and Bankroll Got It, it is believed to be a diss track towards rapper Ice Spice, in response to the song "Think U the Shit (Fart)". A remix featuring American rappers Megan Thee Stallion and Flo Milli was released on June 7, 2024, which was also included on the album. The song debuted at number 100 on the US Billboard Hot 100.

== Background ==
In January 2024, Latto began teasing the song on TikTok. In a snippet of the song that she posted on January 7, the video for Ice Spice's "Pretty Girl" can be seen playing in the background. On February 2, Ice Spice reacted on Twitter Spaces, "Seeing that I'm in the back of your weak ass snippet? I was like, 'Wait a second, that's me?' So I'm like, 'Since we're talking about me, let's talk about me.' It was really just a snippet. I was like, 'This has to be fake. This is AI.' But bitches be bold, so I was like, 'Oh, we're being bold today.'" On February 3, Latto was seen filming a music video in the Bronx, the hometown of Ice Spice. On February 5, she shared an alternate cover art for the single, which shows her posing in front of a collage of female rappers. Each person on the cover, including Latto herself, has their eyes crossed out with a black horizontal line. After the song was released on February 9, Latto denied the song was a diss in response to journalist Elliott Wilson's comments via Twitter (X).

== Content ==
The chorus finds Latto criticizing men who cheat in relationships ("I don't sing R&B but, bitch, I'm really her, fuck wrong with niggas? / How you let him cheat and take him back? / Must be your only nigga") and rapping about how she handles them, in addition to threatening a confrontation if she is booked on the same bill with certain others (alluding to Ice Spice) before using Ice's signature ad-lib "Graaah". In the lyrics, Latto asserts her high status in the music industry and mentions Lil Nas X. She continues to take shots at Ice Spice in the second verse, referencing her song "Think U the Shit (Fart)" (which Spice revealed was aimed at Latto): "Think I'm the shit? Bitch, I know it, ho / Jesus walked on water, I got ice boilin' though". Elsewhere, Latto directs again at Ice Spice and also at Nicki Minaj with the lines "These bitches corny, soon as monkey see, then you know monkey do / Do you rap or do you tweet? / 'Cause I can't tell, get in the booth, bitch / Stop all that motherfuckin' yellin', ho / 'Cause I ain't buyin' what you're sellin', ho".

== Critical reception ==
Tallie Spencer of HotNewHipHop stated "The track not only showcases her lyrical ability, but also serves as a bold declaration of her authenticity and unapologetic attitude" and "Furthermore, Latto's ability to blend bold lyrics with a captivating beat creates a unique and powerful listening experience. The track's production complements her assertive delivery. Making 'Sunday Service' a memorable addition to Latto's growing discography." Brycen Saunders of Hypebeast wrote, "A party or club track for certain, the song sees Latto's smooth, yet robust wrap cadence alongside a strong beat".

== Music video ==
The music video was released alongside the single. In one scene, Latto pays homage to the singer H.E.R., through an appearance of a distinct hairstyle and circular shades. She walks into a deli at one point in the clip, alluding to Ice Spice's song "Deli". The video features a reference to the film Belly, with Latto in neon blue light with glowing iridescent irises. It also references Missy Elliott's music videos by using a fisheye lens.

== Remix ==
An official remix of the song was released on June 7, 2024. It features American rappers Megan Thee Stallion and Flo Milli, beginning with a verse from the latter in which she raps in a threatening fashion, mentions she likes listening to Jodeci during sex, boasts the shape of her buttocks despite her being petite, and asks why someone would bring their male partner to one of her events "if you know he thirsty". Megan performs the last verse in an aggressive style, on which she acknowledges her critics and how men who previously wanted her now hate her. She also states that regardless of how people move the goalposts for her, she will maintain her success.

== Charts ==
Chart performance for "Sunday Service"
Chart (2024)	Peak position
US Billboard Hot 100	100
US Hot R&B/Hip-Hop Songs (Billboard)	26

== Certifications ==
Certifications for "Sunday Service"
Region	Certification	Certified units/sales
United States (RIAA)	Platinum	1,000,000^{‡}
^{‡} Sales+streaming figures based on certification alone.
