= Latto =

American rapper (born 1998)

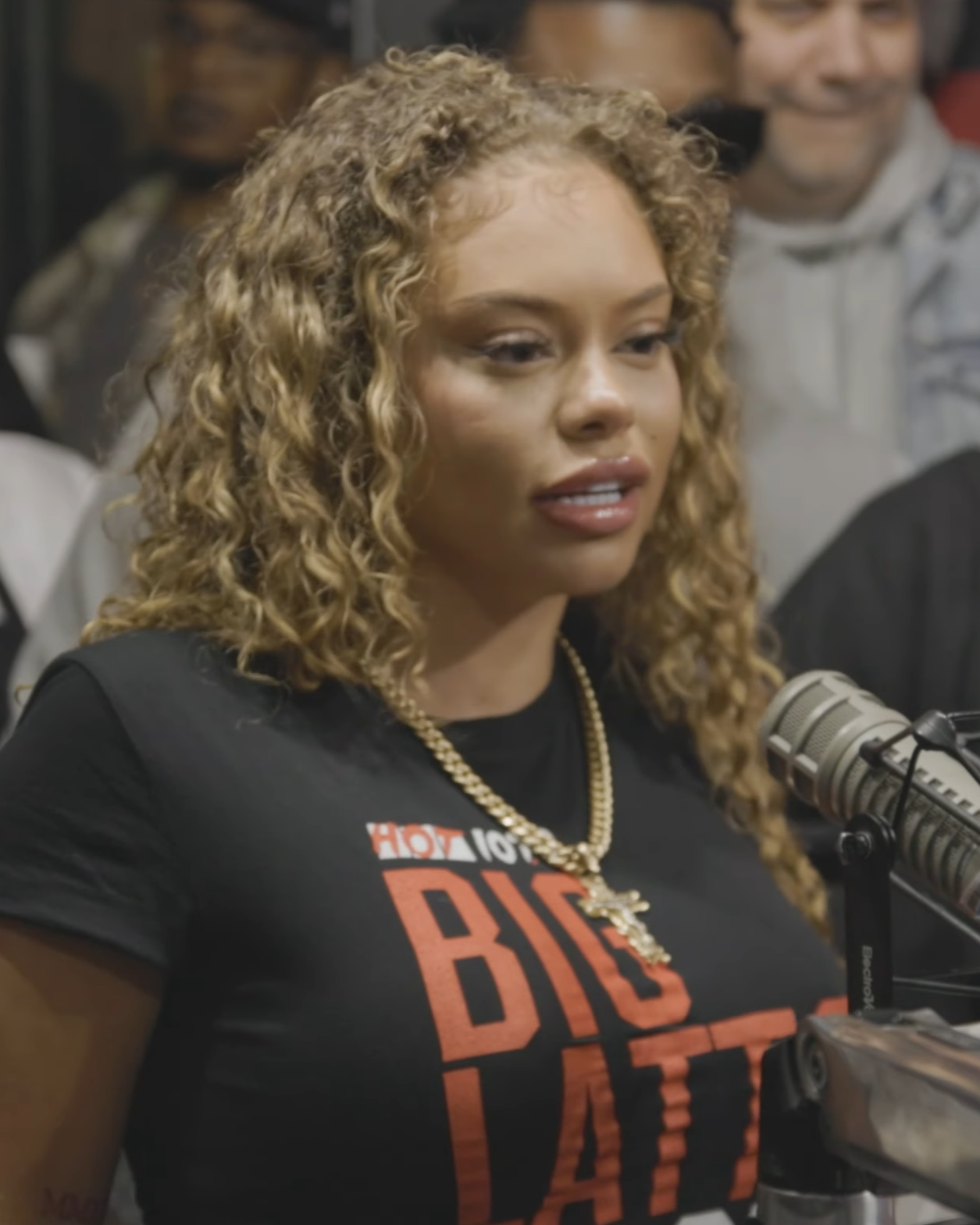
- Latto in 2024

Background information
- Also known as: Miss Mulatto; Mulatto; Big Latto; Big Mama
- Born: Alyssa Michelle Stephens; December 22, 1998 (age 27); Columbus, Ohio, U.S.
- Origin: Riverdale, Georgia, U.S.
- Genres: Southern hip hop; trap; pop rap
- Occupations: Rapper; singer; songwriter
- Works: Latto discography
- Years active: 2010–present
- Labels: RCA; Streamcut; Pittstop
- Partner: 21 Savage (2020–present)
- Children: 1
- Website: biglatto.com

Alyssa Michelle Stephens (born December 22, 1998), known professionally as Latto (formerly known as Mulatto), is an American rapper and singer from Atlanta, Georgia. She first appeared on Jermaine Dupri's reality television series The Rap Game in 2016, where she was known as Miss Mulatto and won the show's first season, but rejected its award of a recording contract with Dupri's So So Def Recordings.

Latto rose to prominence after releasing her 2019 single "Bitch from da Souf," which received double platinum certification by the Recording Industry Association of America (RIAA) and marked her first entry on the Billboard Hot 100. Upon signing with RCA Records, it was issued as the lead single for her debut studio album Queen of da Souf (2020), which performed moderately on the Billboard 200 and spawned the platinum-certified single "Muwop" (featuring Gucci Mane).

After a name change to Latto, she reached wider mainstream recognition after the release of her 2021 single, "Big Energy." The song peaked at number three on the Billboard Hot 100, received triple platinum certification by the RIAA, and landed at number seven on the Year-End Hot 100 chart; its live performance was nominated for Best Melodic Rap Performance, while Latto herself was nominated for Best New Artist at the 65th Annual Grammy Awards. "Big Energy" served as lead single for her second studio album 777 (2022), which trailed the song commercially at number 15 on the Billboard 200. Her guest appearance on Jung Kook's 2023 single "Seven" became her first song to peak atop both the Billboard Hot 100 and Billboard Global 200, while her single "Put It on da Floor Again" (remixed featuring Cardi B) peaked at number 13 on the former chart that same year. The latter served as lead single for her third studio album, Sugar Honey Iced Tea (2024), which matched 777 on the Billboard 200.

Latto has won two BET Awards, a BET Hip Hop Award, a Billboard Music Award, a MTV Video Music Award, and two Grammy nominations. She was included on the 2020 XXL Freshman Class, and was named MTV's "Global Push Artist of the Month" in 2021. Latto was recognized as Variety's "Breakthrough Artist" of 2022, and at the 2022 BET Hip Hop Awards, Latto won Song of the Year for "Big Energy" and was nominated for Album of the Year for 777. She also won the BET Awards for Best New Artist in 2021 and Best Female Hip Hop Artist in 2023.

== Early life ==
Alyssa Michelle Stephens was born in Columbus, Ohio, on December 22, 1998 to Misti Pitts and Shayne Stephens. She attended Lovejoy High School in Hampton, Georgia, south of Atlanta and outside of the metro area. She credits Clayton County as the place which gave her street credibility. Alyssa was bullied in school for being "light-skinned" which inspired her to later adopt the stage name Miss Mulatto when she began her rapping career, after the "mulatto" racial classification. At the age of ten, she decided to become a rapper and began writing her own rap songs. Prior to being in music, she was in drag racing.

== Career ==
=== 2016–2018: Career beginnings and The Rap Game ===
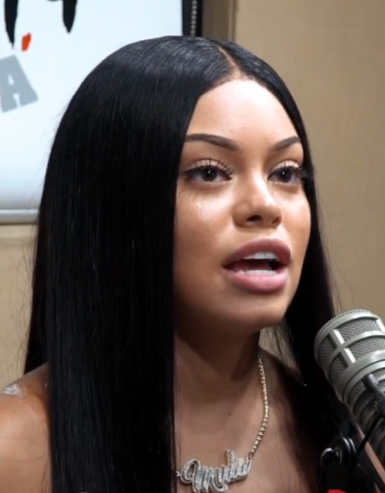
Latto during a WHTA interview, August 2018

In 2016, Alyssa Stephens was a contestant on the Lifetime reality series The Rap Game, produced by Jermaine Dupri and Queen Latifah. The boot camp-style series followed young aspiring rappers in a competition against one another over a span of eight weeks. Latto, under the stage name "Miss Mulatto" at the time, was the overall winner of the competition. She was offered a recording contract from Dupri with So So Def Records but ultimately turned down the deal claiming it was not enough money, opting to be an independent artist. Billboard reported that Latto began working with entertainment attorney Bernie Lawrence-Watkins when she was 17, after her time on The Rap Game.

Stephens' second mixtape, Latto Let 'Em Know, was released in April 2017. The tape featured artists like Molly Brazy, Lil Key, Crucial, and Silentó. The single "Response Diss" is a diss song directed toward Young Lyric, a fellow competitor from The Rap Game. The ongoing feud between the two resulted in diss tracks from both parties with insults about drug use, homosexuality, and past experiences from the show.

=== 2019–2020: Breakthrough and Queen of Da Souf ===
In January 2019, Latto released the song "Bitch from da Souf". In May 2019, she was invited to perform at the Rolling Loud, an annual hip hop festival, located in Miami. In June 2019, she released a second extended play, titled Big Latto, which was preceded by "Bitch from da Souf". The single became a breakout hit, peaking at number 95 on the Billboard Hot 100 chart and was certified gold by the Recording Industry Association of America (RIAA) in the United States. The song later received a remix, featuring rappers Saweetie and Trina, which was later included on Mulatto's third EP, Hit the Latto, which was released on December 12.

In March 2020, it was officially announced that Latto had signed with RCA Records. On April 23, Latto released the promotional single, "No Hook". On May 21, she released the second promotional single, "He Say She Say". In July 2020, she recreated some of rapper Gucci Mane's album covers, starting with 2009's The State vs. Radric Davis, to which Gucci reacted positively. She then announced the release of her single "Muwop", featuring Gucci Mane, which was released on July 30. The song samples Gucci's 2007 single, "Freaky Gurl". Latto made a cameo appearance in American rapper Cardi B's music video for her single "WAP", which was released on August 7, 2020. On the same day, Latto was featured on NLE Choppa's single "Make Em Say", taken from his debut studio album, Top Shotta. On August 11, she was included in XXL's 2020 Freshman Class. On August 12, she announced the release of her debut project through RCA, titled Queen of da Souf and it was released on August 21, 2020. The project was preceded by two singles, which were the remix to "Bitch from da Souf" and "Muwop" featuring Gucci Mane; as well as the promotional singles "No Hook" and "He Say She Say". The album peaked at number 44 on the US Billboard 200.

On September 4, Latto was featured on the remix of the Chloe x Halle song "Do It", alongside Doja Cat and City Girls. Also on that day, Latto was featured on G-Eazy's single, "Down". Music videos for the third and fourth singles from Queen of da Souf, "On God" and "In n Out" featuring City Girls, were released in September and October 2020, respectively. On September 29, it was announced that she had been nominated for Best New Hip Hop Artist at the 2020 BET Hip Hop Awards, where she was a performer. On December 11, Latto released the extended version of Queen of da Souf, which included five new songs and spawned the single "Sex Lies", featuring American rapper Lil Baby.

=== 2021–2023: Name change and 777 ===
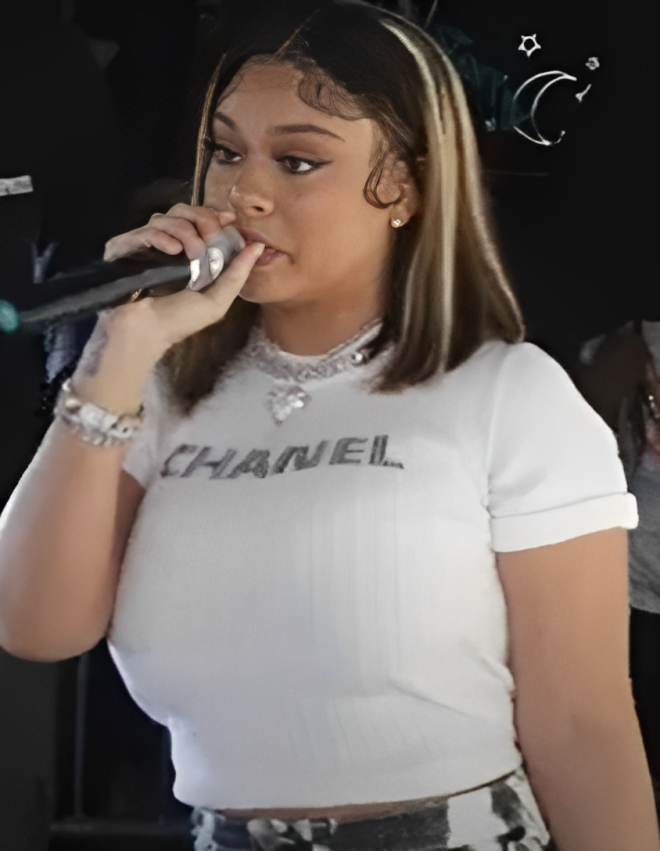
Latto speaking at her album release, November 2021

In January 2021, it was announced that Latto would be changing her stage name from "Mulatto" after the controversy about the word being deemed colorist. In February 2021, it was announced she would be MTV's Global Push Artist of the month. In March 2021, she became the first female rapper from Atlanta to have a solo record be certified gold and platinum with "Bitch from da Souf" (2019) and "Muwop" (2020).

In May 2021, she confirmed she had settled on a new stage name following scrutiny over its racially charged nature. On May 18, it was reported that her name had been changed to Latto on streaming platforms, a change first reflected on her guest appearance on Toosii's album Thank You for Believing. She released the single "The Biggest" alongside the announcement. On September 24, 2021, Latto released "Big Energy", the lead single from her second studio album. The song became her highest-charting entry on the Billboard Hot 100, peaking at number three. American singer Mariah Carey appeared on the official remix, released in March 2022. A follow-up single, "Soufside", was released on November 5.

On March 9, 2022, Latto announced that the song "Wheelie" would be released on March 11, and confirmed it would feature fellow Atlanta rapper 21 Savage. All three songs were included on Latto's second studio album, 777, which was released on March 25. On July 15, she released the song "Pussy". She was featured on Chloe Bailey's single "For the Night". In February 2023, Latto was nominated for Best New Artist at the Grammy Awards. She released the single "Lottery" on February 17, which featured Congolese-Canadian singer Lu Kala. In July, she appeared as a featured artist on South Korean singer Jung Kook's debut solo single "Seven". It debuted at number one on the Billboard Hot 100, becoming her first song to reach the top spot of the chart. She was included in the Forbes 30 Under 30 list for 2024 music. On October 12, Latto released "Did Somebody Say HipOpera," a rap opera collaboration with singer Christina Aguilera.

=== 2024–present: Sugar Honey Iced Tea and Big Mama ===
In January 2024, Latto was featured on the remix of Jennifer Lopez's song "Can't Get Enough", the lead single from Lopez's ninth studio album, This Is Me... Now. On February 5, 2024, Latto announced her single "Sunday Service" via social media. The cover artwork depicts a collage of prominent women rappers printed on a cyclorama back. The eyes of Latto and all the featured rappers are concealed by a black box or horizontal black bar. Her third studio album, Sugar Honey Iced Tea, was released on August 9, 2024. On May 16, 2025, she released the single "Somebody"; the song interpolates the "I really need somebody, tell me you're that somebody" lyric from American singer Aaliyah's 1998 single "Are You That Somebody?".

== Other ventures ==
In 2017, Latto opened her own store, Pittstop Clothing in Jonesboro south of Atlanta.

== Philanthropy ==
In 2021, Latto founded the Win Some Give Some Foundation to “empower at-risk young women by providing them resources and support to achieve a lifetime of success.”

== Personal life ==
She supported Stacey Abrams' 2022 gubernatorial campaign, bringing Abrams onstage while opening for Lizzo's The Special Tour in Atlanta.

In September 2025, Latto confirmed her relationship with rapper 21 Savage. In March 2026, Latto announced her pregnancy. In May 2026, Latto confirmed that she gave birth to their first child, a daughter.

=== Legal issues ===
In May 2019, Latto was arrested for theft when she was mistaken for another woman. She released a track, "Fuck Rice Street", attesting to her innocence and frustration toward the police.

In May 2021, she was arrested after being found in possession of a loaded gun while at Los Angeles International Airport.

On September 28, 2023, she was pulled over after running a red light in Atlanta. She told the officer she was trying to "hurry up and get home" to avoid being followed by fans. She was allowed to head home after receiving a ticket and passing a breathalyzer test.

== Filmography ==
Television series
Year	Title	Role	Notes
2017	The Rap Game	Herself	Winner; credited as "Miss Mulatto"
2019	Love & Hip Hop: Miami	Herself	Episode: "Take It to the House"; credited as "Miss Mulatto"
2020	Queen of Stylez	Herself	Episode: "Can Tokyo Save The Day With This Look?"
2021	Wild 'n Out	Herself	Season 16, Episode 2
2024	Rhythm + Flow	Herself	Judge on the panel of the second season

== Discography ==
- Queen of da Souf (2020)
- 777 (2022)
- Sugar Honey Iced Tea (2024)
- Big Mama (2026)

== Awards and nominations ==
Award	Year	Nominee	Category	Result	Ref.
American Music Awards	2022	Herself	New Artist of the Year	Nominated	
American Music Awards	2022	Herself	Favorite Female Hip Hop Artist	Nominated	
American Music Awards	2022	"Big Energy"	Favorite Rap/Hip Hop Song	Nominated	
Asian Pop Music Awards	2023	"Seven" (with Jung Kook)	Top 20 Songs of the Year (Overseas)	Won	
Asian Pop Music Awards	2023	"Seven" (with Jung Kook)	Best Collaboration (Overseas)	Nominated	
Asian Pop Music Awards	2023	"Seven" (with Jung Kook)	Best Music Video (Overseas)	Nominated	
BET Awards	2022	Herself	Best Female Hip Hop Artist	Nominated	
BET Awards	2022	Herself	Best New Artist	Won	
BET Awards	2023	"Big Energy (Remix)" (with Mariah Carey and DJ Khaled)	Best Collaboration	Nominated	
BET Awards	2023	Herself	Best Female Hip Hop Artist	Won	
BET Awards	2025	"Brokey"	Viewer's Choice	Nominated	
BET Awards	2025	Herself	Best Female Hip Hop Artist	Nominated	
BET Awards	2026	Herself	Best Female Hip Hop Artist	Nominated	
BET Awards	2026	"Go Girl" (with Summer Walker and Doja Cat)	BET Her Award	Nominated	
BET Awards	2026	"Go Girl" (with Summer Walker and Doja Cat)	Best Collaboration	Nominated	
BET Awards	2026	"ErrTime" (with Cardi B and Jeezy)	Best Collaboration	Nominated	
BET Hip Hop Awards	2020	Herself	Best New Hip Hop Artist	Nominated	
BET Hip Hop Awards	2022	"Big Energy"	Song of the Year	Won	
BET Hip Hop Awards	2022	777	Album of the Year	Nominated	
BET Hip Hop Awards	2022	"Pussy"	Impact Track	Nominated	
BET Hip Hop Awards	2023	"Put It on da Floor Again" (featuring Cardi B)	Song of the Year	Nominated	
BET Hip Hop Awards	2023	"Put It on da Floor Again" (featuring Cardi B)	Best Collaboration	Nominated	
Billboard Music Awards	2022	Herself	Top Rap Female Artist	Nominated	
Billboard Music Awards	2023	"Seven" (with Jung Kook)	Top Global K-pop Song	Won	
Billboard Women in Music	2023	Herself	Powerhouse Award	Won	
BMI Pop Awards	2023	"Big Energy"	Award-Winning Songs	Won	
BMI Pop Awards	2024	"Seven"	Award-Winning Songs	Won	
BMI R&B/Hip-Hop Awards	2023	"Big Energy"	Award-Winning Songs	Won	
The Fact Music Awards	2023	"Seven" (with Jung Kook)	Best Music (Fall)	Nominated	
Give Her Flowhers Awards	2022	Herself	Big Femme Energy Award	Won	
Golden Disc Awards	2024	"Seven" (with Jung Kook)	Best Digital Song	Won	
Golden Disc Awards	2024	"Seven" (with Jung Kook)	Song of the Year	Nominated	
Grammy Awards	2023	Herself	Best New Artist	Nominated	
Grammy Awards	2023	"Big Energy (Live)"	Best Melodic Rap Performance	Nominated	
Grammy Awards	2025	"Big Mama"	Best Melodic Rap Performance	Nominated	
iHeartRadio Music Awards	2023	Herself	Best New Hip Hop Artist	Won	
iHeartRadio Music Awards	2023	"Big Energy"	Song of the Year	Nominated	
iHeartRadio Music Awards	2023	"Big Energy"	TikTok Bop of the Year	Nominated	
iHeartRadio Music Awards	2023	"Big Energy"	Favorite Use of a Sample	Nominated	
iHeartRadio Music Awards	2024	"Seven" (with Jung Kook)	Best Music Video	Won	
iHeartRadio Music Awards	2024	"Seven" (with Jung Kook)	K-pop Song of the Year	Nominated	
iHeartRadio Titanium Award	2023	"Big Energy"	1 Billion Total Audience Spins on iHeartRadio Stations	Won	
Korean Music Awards	2024	"Seven" (with Jung Kook)	Best K-Pop Song	Nominated	
Korean Music Awards	2024	"Seven" (with Jung Kook)	Song of the Year	Nominated	
MAMA Awards	2023	"Seven" (with Jung Kook)	Best Collaboration	Won	
MAMA Awards	2023	"Seven" (with Jung Kook)	Best Dance Performance Male Solo	Won	
MAMA Awards	2023	"Seven" (with Jung Kook)	Best Music Video	Nominated	
MAMA Awards	2023	"Seven" (with Jung Kook)	Song of the Year	Nominated	
Melon Music Awards	2023	"Seven" (with Jung Kook)	Millions Top 10	Won	
MTV Europe Music Awards	2021	Herself	Best Push Act	Nominated	
MTV Europe Music Awards	2022	"Pussy"	Video for Good	Nominated	
MTV Europe Music Awards	2023	"Seven" (with Jung Kook)	Best Song	Won	
MTV Video Music Awards	2021	"Sex Lies"	Push Performance of the Year	Nominated	
MTV Video Music Awards	2022	Herself	Best New Artist	Nominated	
MTV Video Music Awards	2022	"Big Energy"	Best Hip Hop	Nominated	
MTV Video Music Awards	2022	"Pussy"	Video for Good	Nominated	
MTV Video Music Awards	2022	"Big Energy (Remix)" (with Mariah Carey and DJ Khaled)	Song of Summer	Nominated	
MTV Video Music Awards	2023	"Seven" (with Jung Kook)	Song of Summer	Won	
MTV Video Music Awards	2024	"Seven" (with Jung Kook)	Best Collaboration	Nominated	
MTV Video Music Awards	2024	"Seven" (with Jung Kook)	Best K-Pop	Nominated	
People's Choice Awards	2022	Herself	New Artist of 2022	Won	
People's Choice Awards	2024	Herself	Hip Hop Artist of the Year	Nominated	
People's Choice Awards	2024	"Seven" (with Jung Kook)	Collaboration Song of the Year	Nominated	
Soul Train Music Awards	2021	"Go Crazy (Remix)" (with Chris Brown, Young Thug, Future, and Lil Durk)	Best Collaboration	Nominated	
Soul Train Music Awards	2021	"Go Crazy (Remix)" (with Chris Brown, Young Thug, Future, and Lil Durk)	Best Video of the Year	Nominated	
TikTok Awards Thailand	2023	"Seven" (with Jung Kook)	International Song of the Year	Won	

=== Listicles ===
Name of publisher, year listed, name of listicle, and placement
Publisher	Year	Listicle	Ref.
MTV	2021	Global Push Artist of the Month (February)	
Variety	2022	Breakthrough Artist	

=== World records ===
Name of publication, year the record was awarded, name of the record, and the name of the record holder
Publication	Year	World record	Record holder	Ref.
Guinness World Records	2023	Most streamed track on Spotify in one week (male)	"Seven" (with Jung Kook)	
Guinness World Records	2023	Fastest time for a music track to reach 100 million streams on Spotify (male)	"Seven" (with Jung Kook)	
Guinness World Records	2023	Fastest time for a music track to reach 1 billion streams on Spotify (male)	"Seven" (with Jung Kook)	

== Tours ==
Headlining

- Big Latto Tour (2019)
- 777 Tour (2022)
- Sugar Honey Iced Tea Tour (2024-2025)

Supporting

- Lizzo – The Special Tour (2022-2023)
- Doja Cat — Tour Ma Vie World Tour (2026)
