= 2021 MTV Video Music Awards =

2021 edition of the MTV Video Music Awards

- Date: Sunday, September 12, 2021
- Venue: Barclays Center, Brooklyn, New York City
- Country: United States
- Hosted by: Doja Cat

Highlights
- Most awards: BTS; Lil Nas X; Olivia Rodrigo (3 each)
- Most nominations: Justin Bieber (9)
- Website: mtv.com/vma

Television/radio coverage
- Network: MTV; The CW; MTV2; VH1; BET; BET Her; Nick at Nite; CMT; Comedy Central; Paramount Network; TV Land; Pop TV; Logo TV; 10 Peach (AU)
- Viewership: 3.7 million
- Produced by: Bruce Gillmer; Jesse Ignjatovic
- Directed by: Joe DeMaio

The 2021 MTV Video Music Awards were held on September 12, 2021, at the Barclays Center in Brooklyn, New York City. This marked the first time in eight years that the venue hosted the show. The show was hosted by hip-hop rapper and singer Doja Cat. It was the first time in history a Video of the Year nominee hosted the ceremony the same year.

The ceremony was simulcast on The CW, a free over-the-air broadcaster, with Mountain and Pacific time zones airing it live and others delayed for primetime, and on various ViacomCBS networks and platforms. Lil Nas X, Olivia Rodrigo and BTS were the most awarded artists of the night with three awards each, followed by Billie Eilish, and Justin Bieber with two each; the latter was also the most nominated artist with nine nominations. Beyoncé extended her lead as the most-awarded artist in the show's history, collecting her 29th trophy. Her daughter Blue Ivy Carter also became the youngest winner in the show's history.

On August 1, a new iteration of the MTV Video Music Awards "moon person" trophy was unveiled at NASA's Kennedy Space Center Visitor Complex, in honor of MTV's 40th anniversary. Designed by Kehinde Wiley, it features vines and flowers symbolizing "the ethnic histories that surround America", with the network stating that "each intertwined vine or leaf" holds a "different historical relevance, such as the seeds from African slaves, that are woven into the American tapestry".

MTV collaborated with 9/11 Day for a week of activities to "promote awareness and positive action" in honor of the 20th anniversary of the September 11 attacks, which fell on the eve of the ceremony.

The show received 3.7 million viewers across all networks, including 900,000 viewers on MTV, representing a 31% drop from last year's 1.3 million. However, the show garnered 38 million interactions across all U.S. platforms, beating the Super Bowl for the first time and becoming 2021's top telecast in social media buzz. Internationally, the VMAs increased 43% in Brazil and 25% in the U.K.

== Performances ==
Lorde was initially announced as a performer for the main show on August 18, 2021, but later pulled out of the event on September 3 "due to a change in production elements". Ed Sheeran additionally performed his new single "Bad Habits", but the clip was uploaded to MTV's YouTube channel instead of being shown during the live broadcast. Anitta made a clip for the song "Girl from Rio" uploaded to MTV's YouTube channel as an advertisement for Burger King, but it was deleted.

List of musical performances
Artist(s)	Song(s)
Pre-show
Polo G	"Rapstar"
Kim Petras	"Future Starts Now"
Swedish House Mafia	"It Gets Better" "Lifetime"
Main show
The Kid Laroi; Justin Bieber	"Stay" "Ghost" (Justin Bieber only)
Olivia Rodrigo	"Good 4 U"
Kacey Musgraves	"Star-Crossed"
Twenty One Pilots	"Saturday"
Ed Sheeran	"Shivers" "Bad Habits" "Perfect" (from the Brooklyn Bridge Park)
Lil Nas X Jack Harlow	"Industry Baby" "Montero (Call Me by Your Name)" (Lil Nas X only)
Camila Cabello	"Don't Go Yet"
Shawn Mendes; Tainy	"Summer of Love"
Doja Cat	"Been Like This" "You Right"
Chlöe	"Have Mercy"
Normani	"Wild Side"
Ozuna	"La Funka"
Foo Fighters	Global Icon Medley: "Learn to Fly" "Shame Shame" "Everlong"
Alicia Keys; Swae Lee	"Lala (Unlocked)" "Empire State of Mind" (Alicia Keys only) (from Liberty State Park)
Busta Rhymes; Spliff Star	Medley: "Put Your Hands Where My Eyes Could See" "Ante Up" "Scenario" "Touch It" "Look at Me Now" "Pass the Courvoisier"
Machine Gun Kelly; Travis Barker	"Papercuts" (presented by Doritos)
Extended Play Stage (Presented by Coors Light)
Saint Jhn	"Sucks To Be You" "Trap" "Roses"
Latto	"Big Energy" "Muwop" "Bitch from da Souf"

== Presenters ==
Presenters for the ceremony were announced on September 8, 2021. Nessa Diab and Jamila Mustafa hosted the 90-minute pre-show event, while Tinashe served as a special celebrity correspondent.

=== Pre-show ===
- Jamila Mustafa — presented Push Performance of the Year
- Tinashe and Bretman Rock — presented Group of the Year

=== Main show ===
- Madonna — opened the show
- Jennifer Lopez — presented Song of the Year
- Hailey Bieber — introduced Kacey Musgraves
- Cyndi Lauper — presented Best Pop
- Madison Beer — introduced the Extended Play Stage and Saint Jhn
- Rita Ora — introduced Ed Sheeran
- Billy Porter — introduced Lil Nas X and Jack Harlow
- Avril Lavigne — presented Video for Good
- Charli XCX — introduced Camila Cabello, Shawn Mendes and Tainy
- Leslie Grace — introduced Latto
- Simone Biles — introduced Doja Cat
- Conor McGregor — presented Artist of the Year
- Halle Bailey — introduced Chlöe
- Wyclef Jean — presented Best Hip-Hop
- Ciara — introduced Normani
- Fat Joe — introduced Ozuna
- Ashanti and Ja Rule — presented Best Collaboration
- AJ McLean, Lance Bass and Nick Lachey — presented Best K-Pop
- Billie Eilish — introduced Foo Fighters and presented the Global Icon Award to them
- SZA — introduced Alicia Keys and Swae Lee
- Tommy Lee — presented Best Alternative
- Doja Cat (host) — presented Best New Artist
- Swizz Beatz — introduced Busta Rhymes
- David Lee Roth — presented Video of the Year
- Megan Fox and Kourtney Kardashian — introduced Machine Gun Kelly and Travis Barker

== Winners and nominees ==
Nominations were announced on August 11, 2021. Justin Bieber was the most-nominated artist with nine, followed by Megan Thee Stallion and BTS with seven. Voting for select categories began on the same day and took place on the VMA website until September 3. Voting for Best New Artist continued until during showtime. Social category nominations, including Group of the Year and Song of Summer, were announced on September 3, 2021. Voting for the former opened on September 4, while voting for the latter opened on September 7—both took place via MTV's Instagram stories. BTS, Olivia Rodrigo and Lil Nas X won the most awards of the night with three each, followed by Billie Eilish, Doja Cat, Silk Sonic and Bieber with two each.

Winners are listed first and in bold.

List of winners and nominees for the 2021 MTV Video Music Awards
Video of the Year	Song of the Year
**Lil Nas X – "Montero (Call Me by Your Name)"**; Cardi B (featuring Megan Thee Stallion) – "WAP"; DJ Khaled (featuring Drake) – "Popstar" (starring Justin Bieber); Doja Cat (featuring SZA) – "Kiss Me More"; Ed Sheeran – "Bad Habits"; The Weeknd – "Save Your Tears"	**Olivia Rodrigo - "Drivers License"**; 24kGoldn (featuring Iann Dior) – "Mood"; Bruno Mars, Anderson .Paak and Silk Sonic – "Leave the Door Open"; BTS – "Dynamite"; Cardi B (featuring Megan Thee Stallion) – "WAP"; Dua Lipa – "Levitating"
Artist of the Year	Best New Artist (presented by Facebook)
**Justin Bieber**; Ariana Grande; Doja Cat; Megan Thee Stallion; Olivia Rodrigo; Taylor Swift	**Olivia Rodrigo**; 24kGoldn; Giveon; The Kid Laroi; Polo G; Saweetie
Push Performance of The Year	Best Collaboration
**Olivia Rodrigo – "Drivers License"**; Wallows – "Are You Bored Yet?"; Ashnikko – "Daisy"; Saint Jhn – "Gorgeous"; 24kGoldn – "Coco"; JC Stewart – "Break My Heart"; Latto – "Sex Lies"; Madison Beer – "Selfish"; The Kid Laroi – "Without You"; Girl in Red – "Serotonin"; Foushee – "My Slime"; Jxdn – "Think About Me"	**Doja Cat (featuring SZA) – "Kiss Me More"**; 24kGoldn (featuring Iann Dior) – "Mood"; Cardi B (featuring Megan Thee Stallion) – "WAP"; Drake (featuring Lil Durk) – "Laugh Now Cry Later"; Justin Bieber (featuring Daniel Caesar and Giveon) – "Peaches"; Miley Cyrus (featuring Dua Lipa) – "Prisoner"
Best Pop	Best Hip Hop
**Justin Bieber (featuring Daniel Caesar and Giveon) – "Peaches"**; Ariana Grande – "Positions"; Billie Eilish – "Therefore I Am"; BTS – "Butter"; Harry Styles – "Treat People with Kindness"; Olivia Rodrigo – "Good 4 U"; Shawn Mendes – "Wonder"; Taylor Swift – "Willow"	**Travis Scott (featuring Young Thug and M.I.A.) – "Franchise"**; Cardi B (featuring Megan Thee Stallion) – "WAP"; Drake (featuring Lil Durk) – "Laugh Now Cry Later"; Lil Baby (featuring Megan Thee Stallion) – "On Me (Remix)"; Moneybagg Yo – "Said Sum"; Polo G – "Rapstar"
Best R&B	Best K-Pop
**Bruno Mars, Anderson .Paak and Silk Sonic – "Leave the Door Open"**; Beyoncé, Blue Ivy Carter, Saint Jhn, and Wizkid – "Brown Skin Girl"; Chris Brown and Young Thug – "Go Crazy"; Giveon – "Heartbreak Anniversary"; H.E.R. (featuring Chris Brown) – "Come Through"; SZA – "Good Days"	**BTS – "Butter"**; Blackpink and Selena Gomez – "Ice Cream"; (G)I-dle – "Dumdi Dumdi"; Monsta X – "Gambler"; Seventeen – "Ready to Love"; Twice – "Alcohol-Free"
Best Latin	Best Rock
**Billie Eilish and Rosalía – "Lo Vas a Olvidar"**; Bad Bunny and Jhay Cortez – "Dakiti"; Black Eyed Peas and Shakira – "Girl Like Me"; J Balvin, Dua Lipa, Bad Bunny, and Tainy – "Un Dia (One Day)"; Karol G – "Bichota"; Maluma – "Hawái"	**John Mayer – "Last Train Home"**; Evanescence – "Use My Voice"; Foo Fighters – "Shame Shame"; The Killers – "My Own Soul's Warning"; Kings of Leon – "The Bandit"; Lenny Kravitz – "Raise Vibration"
Best Alternative	Video for Good
**Machine Gun Kelly (featuring Blackbear) – "My Ex's Best Friend"**; Bleachers – "Stop Making This Hurt"; Glass Animals – "Heat Waves"; Imagine Dragons – "Follow You"; Twenty One Pilots – "Shy Away"; Willow (featuring Travis Barker) – "Transparent Soul"	**Billie Eilish – "Your Power"**; Demi Lovato – "Dancing with the Devil"; H.E.R. – "Fight for You"; Kane Brown – "Worldwide Beautiful"; Lil Nas X – "Montero (Call Me by Your Name)"; Pharrell Williams (featuring Jay-Z) – "Entrepreneur"
Group of the Year	Song of Summer
**BTS**; Blackpink; CNCO; Foo Fighters; Jonas Brothers; Maroon 5; Silk Sonic; Twenty One Pilots	**BTS – "Butter"**; Billie Eilish – "Happier Than Ever"; Camila Cabello – "Don't Go Yet"; DJ Khaled (featuring Lil Baby and Lil Durk) – "Every Chance I Get"; Doja Cat – "Need to Know"; Dua Lipa – "Levitating"; Ed Sheeran – "Bad Habits"; Giveon – "Heartbreak Anniversary"; Justin Bieber (featuring Daniel Caesar and Giveon) – "Peaches"; The Kid Laroi and Justin Bieber – "Stay"; Lil Nas X and Jack Harlow – "Industry Baby"; Lizzo (featuring Cardi B) – "Rumors"; Megan Thee Stallion – "Thot Shit"; Normani (featuring Cardi B) – "Wild Side"; Olivia Rodrigo – "Good 4 U"; Shawn Mendes and Tainy – "Summer of Love"
Best Direction (presented by Discord)	Best Art Direction (presented by Discord)
**Lil Nas X – "Montero (Call Me by Your Name)" (Director: Lil Nas X and Tanu Muino)**; Billie Eilish – "Your Power" (Director: Billie Eilish); DJ Khaled (featuring Drake) – "Popstar" (starring Justin Bieber) (Director: Julien Christian Lutz pka Director X); Taylor Swift – "Willow" (Director: Taylor Swift); Travis Scott (featuring Young Thug and M.I.A.) – "Franchise" (Director: Travis Scott); Tyler, the Creator – "Lumberjack" (Director: Wolf Haley)	**Saweetie (featuring Doja Cat) – "Best Friend" (Art Director: Alec Contestabile)**; Beyoncé, Shatta Wale and Major Lazer – "Already" (Art Directors: Susan Linns and Gerard Santos); Ed Sheeran – "Bad Habits" (Art Director: Alison Dominitz); Lady Gaga – "911" (Art Directors: Tom Foden and Peter Andrus); Lil Nas X – "Montero (Call Me by Your Name)" (Art Director: John Richoux); Taylor Swift – "Willow" (Art Directors: Ethan Tobman and Regina Fernandez)
Best Choreography (presented by Discord)	Best Cinematography (presented by Discord)
**Harry Styles – "Treat People with Kindness" (Choreographer: Paul Roberts)**; Ariana Grande – "34+35" (Choreographers: Brian Nicholson and Scott Nicholson); BTS – "Butter" (Choreographers: Son Sung Deuk with BHM Performance Directing Team); Ed Sheeran – "Bad Habits" (Choreographer: Natricia Bernard); Foo Fighters – "Shame Shame" (Choreographer: Nina McNeely); Marshmello and Halsey – "Be Kind" (Choreographer: Dani Vitale)	**Beyoncé, Blue Ivy Carter, Saint Jhn, and Wizkid – "Brown Skin Girl" (Directors of Photography: Benoit Soler, Malik H. Sayeed, Mohammaed Atta Ahmed, Santiago Gonzalez and Ryan Helfant)**; Billie Eilish – "Therefore I Am" (Director of Photography: Rob Witt); Foo Fighters – "Shame Shame" (Director of Photography: Santiago Gonzalez); Justin Bieber (featuring Chance the Rapper) – "Holy" (Director of Photography: Elias Talbot); Lady Gaga – "911" (Director of Photography: Jeff Cronenweth); Lorde – "Solar Power" (Director of Photography: Andrew Stroud)
Best Editing (presented by Discord)	Best Visual Effects (presented by Discord)
**Bruno Mars, Anderson .Paak and Silk Sonic – "Leave the Door Open" (Editor: Troy Charbonnet)**; BTS – "Butter" (Editor: Yong Seok Choi from Lumpens); Drake – "What's Next" (Editor: Noah Kendal); Harry Styles – "Treat People with Kindness" (Editor: Claudia Wass); Justin Bieber (featuring Daniel Caesar and Giveon) – "Peaches" (Editor: Mark Mayr and Vinnie Hobbs); Miley Cyrus (featuring Dua Lipa) – "Prisoner" (Editor: William Town)	**Lil Nas X – "Montero (Call Me by Your Name)" (Visual Effects: Mathematic)**; Bella Poarch – "Build a Bitch" (Visual Effects: Andrew Donoho, Denhov Visuals, Denis Strahhov, Rein Jakobson, Vahur Kuusk, Tatjana Pavlik and Yekaterina Vetrova); Coldplay – "Higher Power" (Visual Effects: Mathematic); Doja Cat and the Weeknd – "You Right" (Visual Effects: La Pac, Anthony Lestremau, Julien Missaire, Petr Shkolniy, Alexi Bailla, Micha Sher, Antoine Hache, Mikros MPC, Nicolas Huget, Guillaume Ho Tsong Fang, Benjamin Lenfant, Stephane Pivron, MPC Bangalore, Chanakya Chander, Raju Ganesh and David Rouxel); Glass Animals – "Tangerine" (Visual Effects: YSF Studio Paris); Pink – "All I Know So Far" (Visual Effects: Dominique Vidal, Geoffrey Niquet, Annabelle Zoellin and Camille Gibrat)
MTV Global Icon Award
**Foo Fighters**

== Artists with multiple wins and nominations ==
Artists who received multiple awards
Wins	Artist
3	BTS
3	Lil Nas X
3	Olivia Rodrigo
2	Anderson .Paak
2	Billie Eilish
2	Bruno Mars
2	Doja Cat
2	Justin Bieber
2	Silk Sonic

Artists who received multiple nominations
Nominations	Artist
9	Justin Bieber
7	BTS
7	Giveon
7	Megan Thee Stallion
6	Billie Eilish
6	Cardi B
6	Doja Cat
6	Lil Nas X
6	Olivia Rodrigo
5	Drake
5	Dua Lipa
4	24kGoldn
4	Daniel Caesar
4	Ed Sheeran
4	Foo Fighters
4	Silk Sonic
4	Taylor Swift
3	Anderson .Paak
3	Ariana Grande
3	Beyoncé
3	Bruno Mars
3	DJ Khaled
3	Harry Styles
3	Lil Durk
3	Saint Jhn
3	SZA
3	The Kid Laroi
3	Young Thug
2	Bad Bunny
2	Blackpink
2	Blue Ivy Carter
2	Chris Brown
2	Glass Animals
2	H.E.R.
2	Iann Dior
2	Lady Gaga
2	Lil Baby
2	M.I.A.
2	Miley Cyrus
2	Polo G
2	Saweetie
2	Shawn Mendes
2	Tainy
2	The Weeknd
2	Travis Scott
2	Twenty One Pilots
2	Wizkid

== Music Videos with multiple wins and nominations ==
Music Videos that received multiple awards
Wins	Artist(s)	Music Video
3	Lil Nas X	"Montero (Call Me by Your Name)"
2	Bruno Mars, Anderson .Paak and Silk Sonic	"Leave the Door Open"
2	BTS	"Butter"
2	Olivia Rodrigo	"Drivers License"

Music Videos that received multiple nominations
Nominations	Artist(s)	Music Video
5	BTS	"Butter"
5	Lil Nas X	"Montero (Call Me by Your Name)"
4	Cardi B (featuring Megan Thee Stallion)	"WAP"
4	Ed Sheeran	"Bad Habits"
4	Justin Bieber (featuring Daniel Caesar and Giveon)	"Peaches"
3	Bruno Mars, Anderson .Paak and Silk Sonic	"Leave the Door Open"
3	Foo Fighters	"Shame Shame"
3	Harry Styles	"Treat People with Kindness"
3	Taylor Swift	"Willow"
2	24kGoldn (featuring Iann Dior)	"Mood"
2	Beyoncé, Blue Ivy Carter, Saint Jhn, and Wizkid	"Brown Skin Girl"
2	Billie Eilish	"Therefore I Am"
2	Billie Eilish	"Your Power"
2	DJ Khaled (featuring Drake)	"Popstar" (starring Justin Bieber)
2	Doja Cat (featuring SZA)	"Kiss Me More"
2	Drake (featuring Lil Durk)	"Laugh Now Cry Later"
2	Dua Lipa	"Levitating"
2	Giveon	"Heartbreak Anniversary"
2	Lady Gaga	"911"
2	Miley Cyrus (featuring Dua Lipa)	"Prisoner"
2	Olivia Rodrigo	"Drivers License"
2	Olivia Rodrigo	"Good 4 U"
2	Travis Scott (featuring Young Thug and M.I.A.)	"Franchise"
