= Big Energy =

2021 single by Latto

Single by Latto

from the album 777
- Released: September 24, 2021
- Recorded: 2021
- Genre: Funk-pop; pop rap; pop; R&B
- Length: 2:54
- Label: Streamcut; RCA
- Composers: Lukasz Gottwald; A1 LaFlare; Adrian Belew; Chris Frantz; Jaucquez Lowe; Randall Hammers; Steven Stanley; Tina Weymouth; Vaughn Oliver
- Lyricists: Alyssa Stephens; Theron Thomas; A1 LaFlare
- Producers: Dr. Luke; Vaughn Oliver; Latto

Latto singles chronology
"The Biggest" (2021)	"Big Energy" (2021)	"Soufside" (2021)

Music video
- "Big Energy" on YouTube

"Big Energy" is a song by American rapper Latto. It was released through Streamcut and RCA Records on September 24, 2021, as the lead single from Latto's second studio album, 777 (2022). It was written by Latto, A1 LaFlare, Jaucquez Lowe, Randall Hammers, Theron Thomas, Dr. Luke, and Vaughn Oliver, with the latter two handling the production. Adrian Belew, Chris Frantz, Steven Stanley, and Tina Weymouth received songwriting credits since the song interpolates Tom Tom Club's 1981 song "Genius of Love". "Big Energy" has been described as pop and funk-rap.

A remix with American singer Mariah Carey featuring DJ Khaled was released on March 28, 2022, with an interpolation of Carey's song "Fantasy", which also heavily samples "Genius of Love". Following the release of the remix, "Big Energy" earned Latto her first top 10 hit on the US Billboard Hot 100, peaking at number three in April 2022. It also hit number one on Billboard's Hot Rap Songs chart for 2 weeks. Consequently, it became the highest-charting solo song by a female rapper since March 2021. The song also reached the top 10 in Australia and Canada, and top 20 in New Zealand. "Big Energy" became Latto's breakthrough on mainstream radio, and she performed the song live on several television appearances. The live version received a nomination for Best Melodic Rap Performance at the 65th Annual Grammy Awards.

== Background and release ==
In May 2021, Latto released the song "The Biggest" following the announcement of her stage name changing from Mulatto to Latto. Released in September, "Big Energy" was first premiered at the 2021 MTV Video Music Awards, where Latto performed three songs in short segments throughout the show. Latto also promoted the song with performances at the 2021 BET Hip Hop Awards and on Late Night with Seth Meyers. In April 2022, she performed a medley of "Big Energy" and "Sunshine" on The Tonight Show Starring Jimmy Fallon.

Theron Thomas originally wrote "Big Energy" for Cardi B but gave it to Latto instead.

== Recording and production ==
Latto told Billboard that in the lyrics she took the "masculine, trendy 'big dick energy' quote" from social media and made it a concept that all genders can have and take it deeper than just a sexual aspect." Latto added, "I wanted it to be empowering. It's an aura that you carry and a confidence. It's just an overall vibe and when you walk in the room, you have 'big energy' and no one can tell you otherwise". Her A&R representatives first played her the beat during a studio session in Los Angeles, which she felt keen on but perceived it as musically different and "out of [her] comfort zone". Latto described the writing process as a dynamic collaborative effort, collecting different opinions with "people in the room [to] bounce ideas off of each other... talking out loud, playing the beat out loud. It wasn't a sit-down-and-write type of thing... and I was asking the girls in the room, 'What does big energy mean to you?'

The song was produced by Dr. Luke and Vaughn Oliver. The funk-infused pop and pop-rap song heavily interpolates the 1981 single, "Genius of Love" by Tom Tom Club, one of the most sampled rhythm tracks of the 1980s, particularly within the hip hop and R&B genre. Notable sample uses of that single include Dr. Jeckyl & Mr. Hyde's "Genius Rap" in 1981, Grandmaster Flash and the Furious Five's "It's Nasty" in 1982, Mariah Carey's "Fantasy" in 1995, and The X-Ecutioners' "Genius of Love 2002" in 2002. Latto stated that the sample was a new sound for her that "might cause controversy", but felt confident that its catchiness would bring a new audience and wider fanbase to her career. In another interview, however, Latto declared that she wants to avoid the mainstream public thinking that her music catalog sounds similar to the pop-leaning "Big Energy", saying that she prioritizes rap music with different composition and that "that's not where [her] heart is".

== Critical reception ==
Melinda Fakuade of Rolling Stone wrote about Latto experimenting with the pop sound, saying it is "a conscious attempt of a creative risk", and perceiving "Big Energy" as "hyper-curated for the TikTok generation". In Clash, Ana Lamond said that the "playful" single channels "colourful nostalgia with a lush, groovy finish," that welcomes a "pop-centric commercial appeal" on the album. Billboard's Rania Aniftos wrote that Latto put a "feminine, empowering spin" on the social media phrase for the "energetic" track. Jordan Bassett from NME wrote that the song is "a dumb, fun summer anthem wrapped up in a squelchy sample" that is "the feel-good highpoint" of the album. Aaron Williams of Uproxx said that the "spunky" track represents a departure from her previously established sound to a "lighthearted" song. In a mixed review, Tom Breihan in Stereogum opined the single "hypercharged" the strategy of using nostalgic beats, and called it a "cynical and obvious hit-chasing attempt", further adding from its "glitzy video" to its "gleaming hooks" is "pure product". Pitchfork's Tyra Triche thought the song sounds "almost like a jingle", and felt unconvinced by the lyrics and the "bit dated" meme it references. Quincy of Ratings Game Music rated the song 3 out of 5 stars and wrote that it was "too cheesy" for him.

== Accolades ==
Awards and nominations for "Big Energy"
Year	Organization	Award	Result	Ref(s)
2022	American Music Awards	Favorite Rap/Hip Hop Song	Nominated	
2022	BET Hip Hop Awards	Song of the Year	Won	
2023	Grammy Awards	Best Melodic Rap Performance	Nominated	
2023	iHeartRadio Music Awards	Song of the Year	Nominated	
2023	iHeartRadio Music Awards	TikTok Bop of the Year	Nominated	
2023	iHeartRadio Music Awards	Favorite Use of a Sample	Nominated	
2023	iHeartRadio Titanium Award	1 Billion Total Audience Spins on iHeartRadio Stations	Won	

== Commercial performance ==
"Big Energy" debuted at number 88 on the US Billboard Hot 100, for the week dated November 6, 2021, becoming Latto's highest-charting song on the chart since "Bitch from da Souf", which peaked at number 95 in 2020. Supported by the release of the remix, the song reached number three in its 23rd week on the chart, becoming Latto's first top 10 entry. It became the highest-charting solo song by a female rapper since Cardi B's "Up" in March 2021. "Big Energy" spent four weeks in the top five. The song also reached number one on the US Hot R&B/Hip-Hop Songs and Hot Rap Songs, a first for Latto in both of them. It topped each for two weeks.

Latto became the first female rapper since Lizzo (2019) to reach number one on the Radio Songs chart. Latto also became the first female rapper to reach number one on the Mainstream Top 40, Urban, and Rhythmic radio formats with the same song. It marked the sixth song by a female artist to accomplish this, following Mariah Carey's "We Belong Together" (2005), Mary J. Blige's "Be Without You" (2005), Beyoncé's "Irreplaceable" (2006), Alicia Keys' "No One" (2007), and Rihanna's "Rude Boy" (2010). Among component charts, the song became Latto's first top 10 on the US Streaming Songs chart. The track placed at No. 7 on the Billboard year-end chart for 2022.

== Music video ==
The song's video was directed by Arrad. It was released alongside the song. According to Complex, the video "capitalizes on the theme of chance", as the clip's leading man gives it a try at the lottery, while Latto is dancing and singing against a "casino backdrop", and the man gets struck "by what seems to be Cupid's arrow". The concept stems from the Latto/lotto wordplay. The video features a scene of Latto wearing a costume in the colors of a lady beetle, represented in the cover art for the single.

== Live performances ==
Latto first performed "Big Energy" in September 2021, prior to the song's release, at the 2021 MTV Video Music Awards, where she also performed "Bitch from da Souf" and "Muwop". In October 2021, she performed the song at the 2021 BET Hip Hop Awards. In November 2021, Latto made her late-night debut on Late Night with Seth Meyers, performing "Big Energy". In April 2022, Latto performed the aforementioned song and "Sunshine" on The Tonight Show Starring Jimmy Fallon. A month later, Latto performed "Big Energy" at the 2022 Billboard Music Awards.

== Personnel ==
Credits adapted from Tidal.

- Latto – songwriting, vocals
- Lukasz Gottwald – co-production, songwriting
- Vaughn Oliver – co-production, songwriting
- A1 LaFlare – songwriting
- Jaucquez Lowe – songwriting
- Randall Hammers – songwriting
- Tina Weymouth – songwriting
- Chris Frantz – songwriting
- Steven Stanley – songwriting
- Adrian Belew – songwriting
- Joey Galvan – engineer
- Kalani Thompson – engineer
- Nicholas Albrecht – mastering engineer
- Clint Gibbs – mixing engineer
- Connor Hedge – engineer assistant
- Fili Filizzola – engineer assistant
- Hector Vega – engineer assistant
- Tyler Sheppard – engineer assistant
- Chloe Angelides – background vocals

== Charts ==
=== Weekly charts ===
Chart performance for "Big Energy"
Chart (2021–2022)	Peak position
Australia (ARIA)	13
Australia Urban (ARIA)	5
Brazil (Pop Internacional)	4
Canada Hot 100 (Billboard)	9
Canada AC (Billboard)	12
Canada CHR/Top 40 (Billboard)	1
Canada Hot AC (Billboard)	3
Finland Airplay (IFPI Finland)	38
Germany Download (Official German Charts)	55
Global 200 (Billboard)	32
Honduras (Monitor Latino)	16
Hungary (Single Top 40)	16
Israel (Media Forest)	1
Ireland (IRMA)	65
New Zealand (Recorded Music NZ)	12
Panama Anglo (Monitor Latino)	12
Romania Airplay (Media Forest)	5
South Africa (RISA)	62
UK Singles (Official Charts)	21
UK Hip Hop/R&B (Official Charts)	31
US Billboard Hot 100	3
US Adult Contemporary (Billboard)	25
US Adult Pop Airplay (Billboard)	6
US Dance Airplay (Billboard)	4
US Hot R&B/Hip-Hop Songs (Billboard)	1
US Pop Airplay (Billboard)	1
US R&B/Hip-Hop Airplay (Billboard)	9
US Rhythmic Airplay (Billboard)	1

=== Year-end charts ===
2022 year-end chart performance for "Big Energy"
Chart (2022)	Position
Canada (Canadian Hot 100)	17
Global 200 (Billboard)	119
New Zealand (Recorded Music NZ)	24
US Billboard Hot 100	7
US Adult Top 40 (Billboard)	18
US Hot R&B/Hip-Hop Songs (Billboard)	3
US Mainstream Top 40 (Billboard)	6
US Rhythmic (Billboard)	1

== Certifications ==
Certifications for "Big Energy"
Region	Certification	Certified units/sales
Brazil (Pro-Música Brasil)	Platinum	40,000^{‡}
Canada (Music Canada)	4× Platinum	320,000^{‡}
New Zealand (RMNZ)	3× Platinum	90,000^{‡}
Switzerland (IFPI Switzerland)	Gold	10,000^{‡}
United States (RIAA)	4× Platinum	4,000,000^{‡}
^{‡} Sales+streaming figures based on certification alone.

== Release history ==
Release history for "Big Energy"
Region	Date	Format	Label	Ref.
Various	September 24, 2021	Digital download; streaming	Streamcut; RCA	
United States	October 12, 2021	Rhythmic contemporary radio	Streamcut; RCA	
United States	October 12, 2021	Urban contemporary radio	Streamcut; RCA	
United States	January 10, 2022	Contemporary hit radio	Streamcut; RCA	

== Remix ==
"Big Energy" (remix)

Single by Latto and Mariah Carey featuring DJ Khaled

from the album 777
- Released: March 28, 2022
- Recorded: 2022
- Genre: Pop; R&B
- Length: 3:01
- Label: Streamcut; RCA
- Composers: Lukasz Gottwald; Mariah Carey; A1 LaFlare; Adrian Belew; Chris Frantz; Jaucquez Lowe; Randall Hammers; Steven Stanley; Tina Weymouth; Vaughn Oliver; Dave Hall
- Lyricists: Alyssa Stephens; Theron Thomas; A1 LaFlare; Mariah Carey
- Producers: Dr. Luke; Vaughn Oliver; Latto

Latto singles chronology
"Wheelie" (2022)	"Big Energy" (remix) (2022)	"Sunshine" (2022)

Mariah Carey singles chronology
"Fall in Love at Christmas" (2021)	"Big Energy" (remix) (2022)	"Circles" (2023)

DJ Khaled singles chronology
"Amazing" (2021)	"Big Energy" (remix) (2022)	"Staying Alive" (2022)

Lyric video
- "Big Energy" (remix) on YouTube

A remix of "Big Energy" with American singer-songwriter Mariah Carey featuring DJ Khaled was released on March 28, 2022, and was included on Latto's second studio album, 777 (2022). The remix features an interpolation and samples of Carey's song "Fantasy", which also heavily samples "Genius of Love".

The remix peaked at number six in Australia, where it became Latto's first top-ten hit, Carey's 18th, and Khaled's fifth; it was subsequently certified 3× platinum in the country. It also reached the top 25 in Ireland and the United Kingdom. The remix received positive reviews from critics and was nominated for the Song of the Summer Award at the 2022 MTV Video Music Awards.

=== Background and release ===
Latto stated that she first conceived the idea of having American singer Mariah Carey on the remix back in November 2021. Although she was her first option, Latto "did not think [she] could get her realistically".

On March 25, 2022, Latto revealed that Mariah Carey and record producer DJ Khaled would be featured on her "Big Energy" remix, set to be released March 28, 2022. This announcement came days after speculation on who was to be featured on the song's remix grew as Latto released her album's tracklist, blurring the featured artist's name. A few days later, on March 25, Latto ultimately revealed through the single cover art that the blurred artist would be Mariah Carey, after a Twitter exchange between the two artists, which further increased speculation.

=== Production ===
In the remix, Mariah Carey supplies her signature whistle notes to the intro of the song, while Latto raps the first verse. Carey follows with an interpolation of the opening verse of her song "Fantasy", and then sings the post-chorus that merges both songs. Musically, the remix has been described as a blend of pop and R&B.

=== Critical reception ===
In Variety, Ellise Shafer called the Mariah Carey remix a "crossover of epic proportions", as both Latto's "Big Energy" and Carey's "Fantasy" sample the same track. Glenn Rowley of Billboard called it a "sparkling collab". Uproxx's Caitlin White considered it a "bonafide R&B/pop hit". Quincy of Ratings Game Music rated the remix 2 out of 5 stars and wrote that Carey "tastefully upstaged" Latto's raps.

=== Accolades ===
Awards and nominations for "Big Energy" (Remix)
Year	Organization	Award	Result	Ref(s)
2023	BET Awards	Best Collaboration	Nominated	
2022	MTV Video Music Awards	Song of Summer	Nominated	

=== Commercial performance ===
The remix of "Big Energy" with Mariah Carey featuring DJ Khaled reached number one on the US Digital Song Sales chart with 12,600 downloads sold, becoming Latto's first chart-topper, Carey's fourth, and Khaled's third. Supported by the release of the remix, the song reached number three on the overall Billboard Hot 100, becoming Latto's first top 10 entry. However, Carey and DJ Khaled were not listed on "Big Energy" on the Hot 100, as the remix did not account for the majority of the song's overall consumption during the tracking week.

In Australia, the remix peaked at number six, becoming Latto's first top-ten hit there, as well as Khaled's fifth and Carey's 18th. For Carey, it became her first song to hit the top-ten in nine years since "#Beautiful" in 2013, and her highest-charting single since the aforementioned song. In the United Kingdom, the remix peaked at number 21 on the UK Singles chart, becoming Latto's first top-40 hit there, as well as Khaled's eighth and Carey's 40th. It also marked Carey's first song since "#Beautiful" to hit the top-40 in the country, and her highest-charting song there since "I Want to Know What Love Is" in 2009. In Ireland, the remix peaked at number 20, becoming Latto's first top-20 hit, Khaled's sixth, and Carey's 22nd. The song marked Carey's first song in 14 years to hit the top-20 in the country and her highest-charting song since "Touch My Body" in 2008.

=== Live performances ===
Latto performed the remix of "Big Energy" for the first time at the 2022 BET Awards, with a surprise appearance by Mariah Carey.

=== Personnel ===
Credits adapted from Tidal.

- Latto – songwriting, vocals
- Mariah Carey – songwriting, vocals
- DJ Khaled – songwriting, vocals
- Lukasz Gottwald – co-production, songwriting
- Vaughn Oliver – co-production, songwriting
- A1 LaFlare – songwriting
- Jaucquez Lowe – songwriting
- Randall Hammers – songwriting
- Tina Weymouth – songwriting
- Chris Frantz – songwriting
- Steven Stanley – songwriting
- Adrian Belew – songwriting
- Dave Hall – songwriting
- Joey Galvan – engineer
- Kalani Thompson – engineer
- Brian Garten – engineer
- Nicholas Albrecht – mastering engineer
- Clint Gibbs – mixing engineer
- Connor Hedge – engineer assistant
- Fili Filizzola – engineer assistant
- Hector Vega – engineer assistant
- Tyler Sheppard – engineer assistant
- Chloe Angelides – background vocals

=== Charts ===
==== Weekly charts ====
Chart performance for "Big Energy" (Remix)
Chart (2022)	Peak position
Australia (ARIA)	6
Australia Urban (ARIA)	2
Ireland (IRMA)	20
New Zealand Hot Singles (RMNZ)	20
UK Singles (Official Charts)	21
UK Hip Hop/R&B (Official Charts)	7
US Digital Song Sales (Billboard)	1

==== Year-end charts ====
2022 year-end chart performance for "Big Energy" (Remix)
Chart (2022)	Position
Australia (ARIA)	20
US Digital Song Sales (Billboard)	3

=== Certifications ===
Certifications for "Big Energy" (Remix)
Region	Certification	Certified units/sales
Australia (ARIA)	3× Platinum	210,000^{‡}
United Kingdom (BPI)	Platinum	600,000^{‡}
^{‡} Sales+streaming figures based on certification alone.

=== Release history ===
Release history for "Big Energy" (Remix)
Region	Date	Format	Version	Label	Ref.
Various	March 28, 2022	Digital download; streaming	Remix	Streamcut; RCA	
Various	March 31, 2022	Digital download; streaming	Explicit remix	Streamcut; RCA	
Italy	April 15, 2022	Radio airplay	Remix	Sony	
