= Wheelie (Latto song) =

Single by Latto featuring 21 Savage

from the album 777
- Released: March 11, 2022
- Genre: Hip hop; trap
- Label: RCA
- Songwriters: Alyssa Stephens; Shéyaa Bin Abraham-Joseph; Sage Skolfield; Sean Solymar; Juicy J; Joshua Goods; Kameron Cole; DJ Paul
- Producers: Hollywood Cole; Sage Skolfield; Sean Solymar

Latto singles chronology
| "Soufside" (2021) | "Wheelie" (2022) | "Big Energy" (remix) (2022) |

21 Savage singles chronology
| "Peru (Remix)" (2022) | "Wheelie" (2022) | "Cash In Cash Out" (2022) |

"Wheelie" is a song by American rapper Latto featuring British-American rapper 21 Savage. It was released on March 11, 2022, through RCA Records, as the third single from Latto's second studio album, 777 (2022).

== Background and release ==
In September 2021, Latto released "Big Energy" as the lead single of her then-upcoming sophomore album 777. The song became her first top-40 hit in the United States. In November 2021, Latto released the track "Soufside", along with the track's music video. "Wheelie" is Latto's second collaboration with 21 Savage; the first was "Pull Up", from Latto's debut album Queen of da Souf.

In February 2022, Latto teased the song on her Instagram account. She then posted a video on TikTok, hinting at who would be featured on the song. She said in the video that the featured artist was "a parent, a diamond-certified act, and a previous Met Gala attendee". Certain social media users theorized that the artist in question was Cardi B or Nicki Minaj, but Latto confirmed that the artist was a male, later announcing that the featured artist would be 21 Savage, along with the song's release date and cover art. "Wheelie" was released on March 11, 2022, as the second single from 777.

== Composition and reception ==
The song contains a sample from the Three 6 Mafia song "Slob on My Knob". The song has been described as "raunchy" and contains a "booming bass line". Latto and 21 Savage exchange sexual innuendos and make usage of ad-libs on the song. The song is about how "players" are unable to handle Latto's "sexual energy". The lyrics to "Wheelie" were described as "boastful" by a reviewer at Uproxx.

Consequence named "Wheelie" the "best rap song of the week". Robby Seabrook of XXL also called the track one of the "best new songs of the week". Grace Powers, for Music Daily, called 21 Savage's contributions to the song "underwhelming", and remarked that "he sounds uninterested". Lauren Floyd felt that Latto used the "Slob on My Knob" sample "just for empty recognition".

== Music video ==
The music video for "Wheelie" was directed by Colin Tilley. In it, Latto performs the vehicular maneuver known as a wheelie on a motorcycle around Atlanta, while driving on a highway. In another section of the music video, Latto dances in a parking lot filled with cars, and shows off a "custom-made, diamond studded" cryptocurrency wallet made by American jeweler Greg Yuna. In a later part of the clip, Latto dances on a bed inside the fictional "Big Latto Mattress Store".

Wongo Okon of Uproxx called the video "thrilling".

== Credits and personnel ==
Credits are adapted from Spotify.

- Latto – performer, songwriter
- 21 Savage – performer, songwriter
- Hollywood Cole – songwriter, producer
- Sage Skolfield – songwriter, producer
- Sean Solymar – songwriter, producer
- Jocelyn Donald – songwriter
- Joshua Goods – songwriter
- Markus Randle – songwriter
- DJ Paul – songwriter (credited due to involvement on "Slob on My Knob")
- Jordan Houston – songwriter (credited due to involvement on "Slob on My Knob")

== Charts ==
Chart performance for "Wheelie"
| Chart (2022) | Peak position |
|---|---|
| New Zealand Hot Singles (RMNZ) | 35 |
| US Bubbling Under Hot 100 (Billboard) | 14 |
