= Spend It =

Spend It may refer to:

- "Spend It", a 2011 song by 2 Chainz
- "Spend It", a 2023 song by Coi Leray from Coi
- "Spend It", a 2019 song by Iggy Azalea from In My Defense
- "Spend It", a 2020 song by Mulatto from Queen of Da Souf
