= Everything Changed... =

2019 EP by Social House

EP by Social House
- Released: August 9, 2019
- Genre: Trap-pop; R&B
- Length: 17:51
- Label: School Boy; Republic
- Producer: Anton Göransson; Charles Anderson; Edgar Barrera; Michael Foster; Steven Franks; Tommy Brown

Singles from Everything Changed...
- 1. "Haunt You" Released: June 14, 2019; 2. "Boyfriend" Released: August 2, 2019

Everything Changed... is the debut extended play (EP) by American musical duo Social House, released on August 9, 2019, through School Boy Records and Republic Records.

== Critical reception ==
Nicole Almeida of Atwood Magazine gave the EP a positive review stating that "[the EP] is an eclectic and addictive body of work which shows the diverse nature of the duo’s influences", adding "everything [Social House] do[es], they do well".

== Track listing ==
Track listing adapted from Tidal.

All tracks produced by Charles Anderson, Michael Foster and Anton Göransson, except for "Boyfriend" produced by Edgar Barrera, Steven Franks and Tommy Brown.

No.	Title	Writer(s)	Length
1.	"At Least We Can Say That We Tried"	Anderson; Foster; Brown; Göransson; Isabella Sjostrand	2:36
2.	"Haunt You"	Anderson; Foster; Brown; Göransson; Sjostrand	3:18
3.	"Why You Always Gotta Start Something"	Anderson; Foster; Brown; Göransson; Sjostrand	3:45
4.	"Love Me Back"	Anderson; Foster; Brown; Göransson; Sjostrand	2:35
5.	"Boyfriend" (with Ariana Grande)	Anderson; Foster; Brown; Ariana Grande; Barrera; Franks	3:06
6.	"Tropical Rain"	Anderson; Foster; Brown; Göransson; Sjostrand	2:31
Total length:			17:51

Notes

- "Haunt You" contains uncredited vocals from Ariana Grande.
- "Boyfriend" is stylized in all lowercase.

== Charts ==
Chart (2019)	Peak position
Canadian Albums (Billboard)	33
Lithuanian Albums (AGATA)	95
US Billboard 200	56
