= Grammy Award for Best Pop Duo/Group Performance =

Music award for collaborative performances

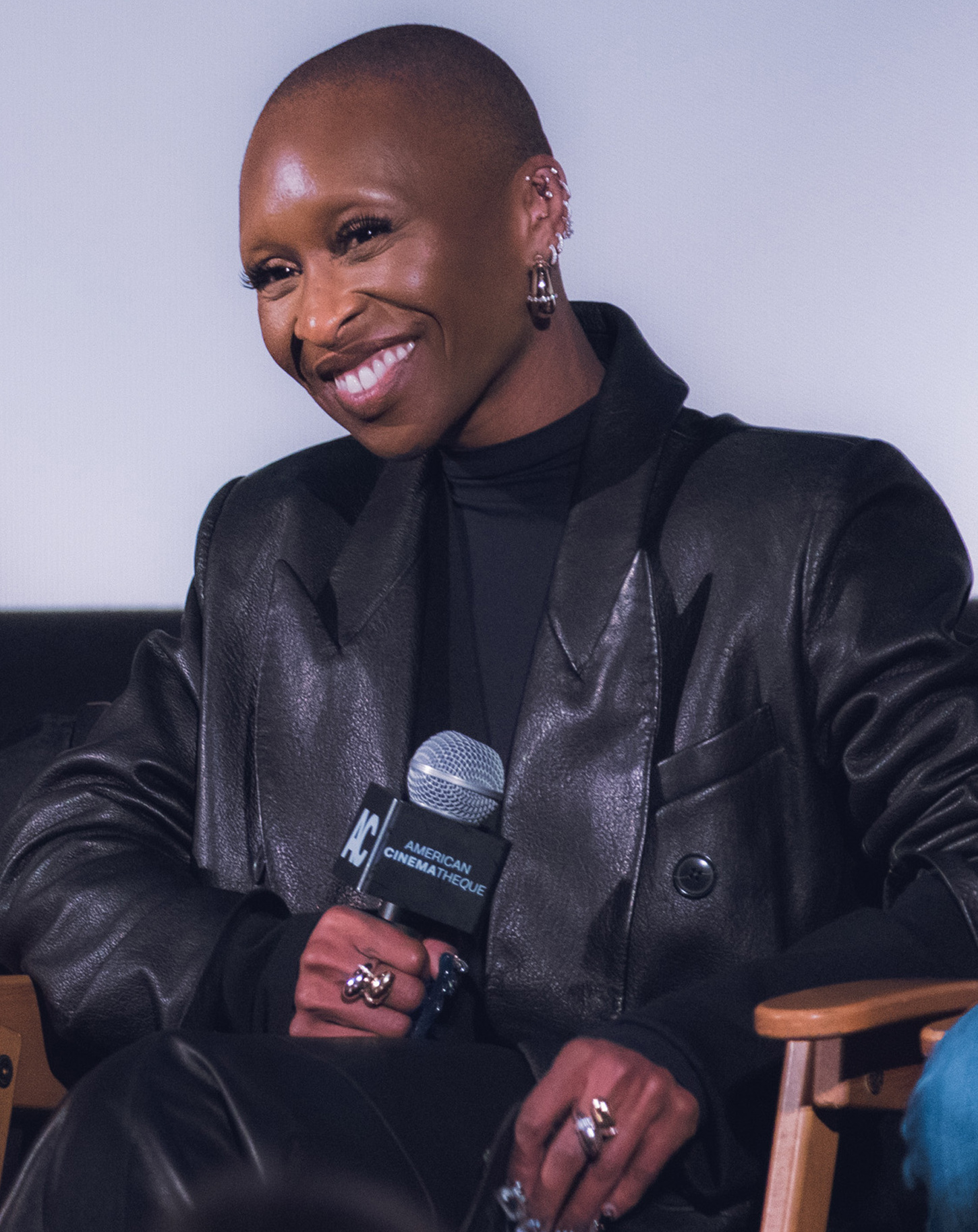
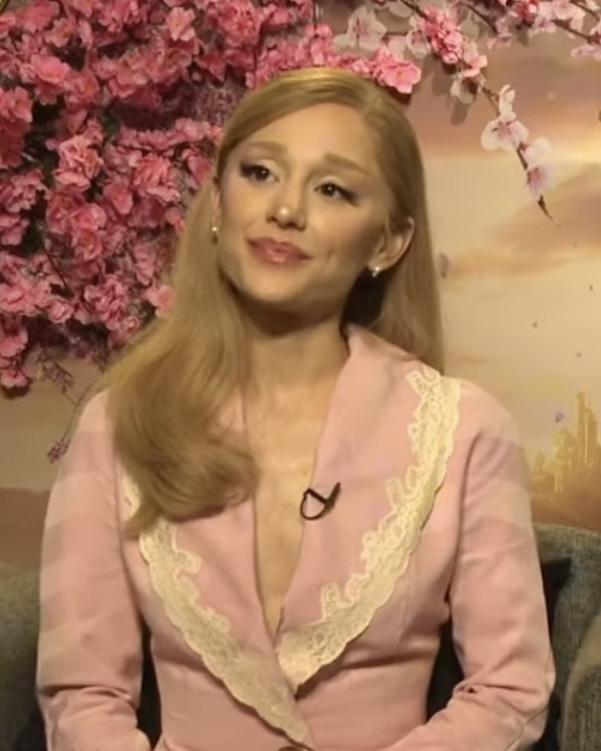
- "Defying Gravity" by Cynthia Erivo & Ariana Grande is the most recent recipient
- Awarded for: Artistic excellence in a duo, group, or collaborative vocal or instrumental pop performance
- Country: United States
- Presented by: National Academy of Recording Arts and Sciences
- First award: 2012
- Currently held by: Cynthia Erivo & Ariana Grande – "Defying Gravity" (2026)

Highlights
- Most wins: Lady Gaga (3)
- Most nominations: Coldplay, Ariana Grande, Lady Gaga and Taylor Swift (5 each)
- Website: grammy.com

The Grammy Award for Best Pop Duo/Group Performance is an award presented at the Grammy Awards, a ceremony that was established in 1958 and originally called the Gramophone Awards.

According to the 63rd Grammy Awards category rules, "this category recognizes artistic excellence in a duo, group, or collaborative vocal or instrumental pop performance. Recordings on which a group receives artist billing are eligible here, even when the vocal features only one member of the group. The entire group or collaborative performance, rather than the presence of a lead vocal performance, determines category eligibility".

The award goes to the performing artists. The producer, vocal arranger, engineer and songwriter can apply for a Winners Certificate.

It was one of several new categories for the annual Grammy Awards ceremony to start from 2012. It combines the previous categories for Best Pop Collaboration with Vocals, Grammy Award for Best Pop Performance by a Duo or Group with Vocals and Best Pop Instrumental Performance. The restructuring of these categories was a result of the Recording Academy's wish to decrease the list of categories and awards and to eliminate the distinctions between collaborations and duo or groups.

Lady Gaga has the most wins in this category, with three. SZA, Bruno Mars and Ariana Grande are the only other acts overall to win this category multiple times, each with two wins. Coldplay, Taylor Swift, Gaga and Grande are the acts with most nominations in this category, receiving a total of five nods.

== Recipients ==
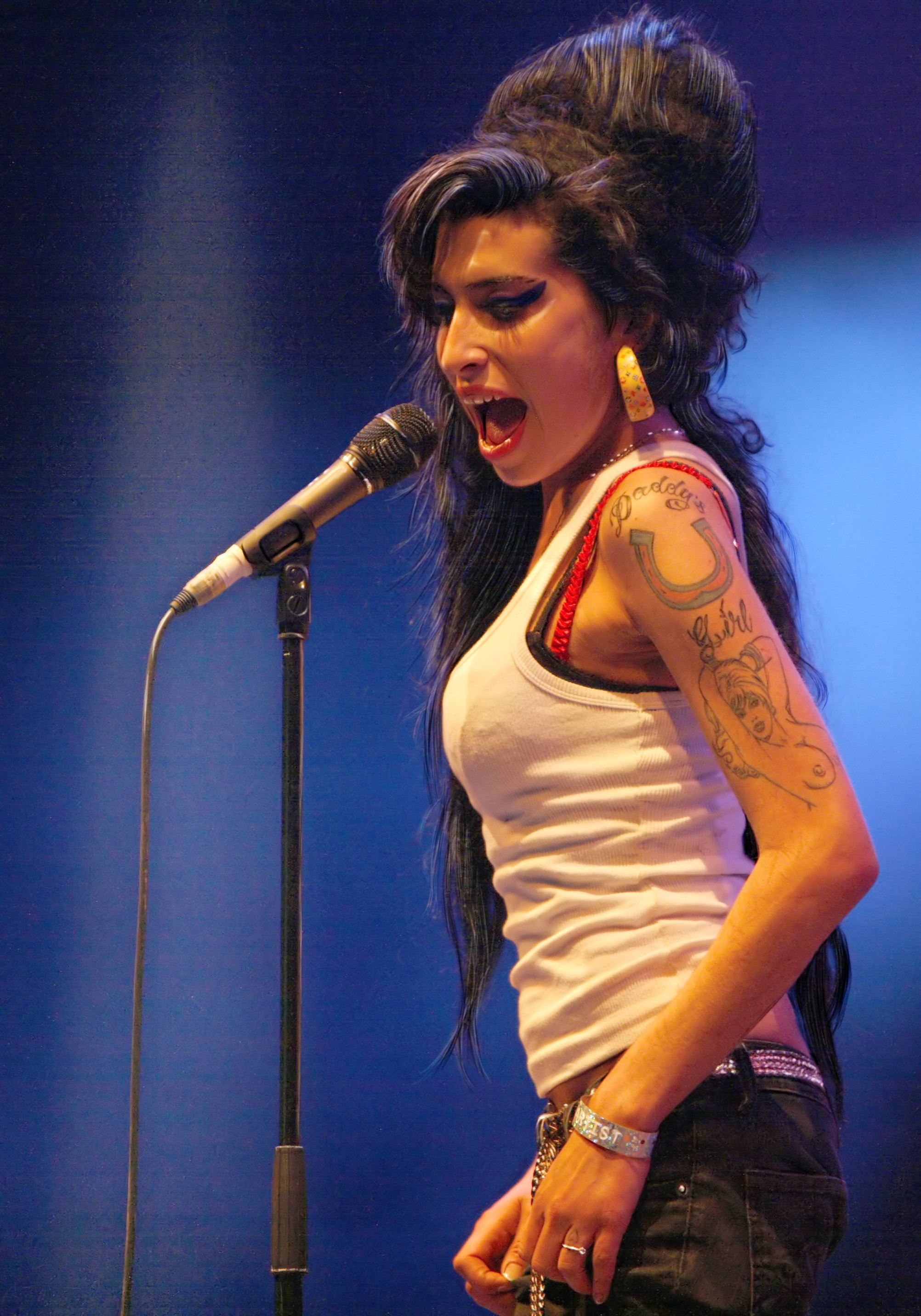
2012 winner Amy Winehouse received her first posthumous award for "Body and Soul" with Tony Bennett.

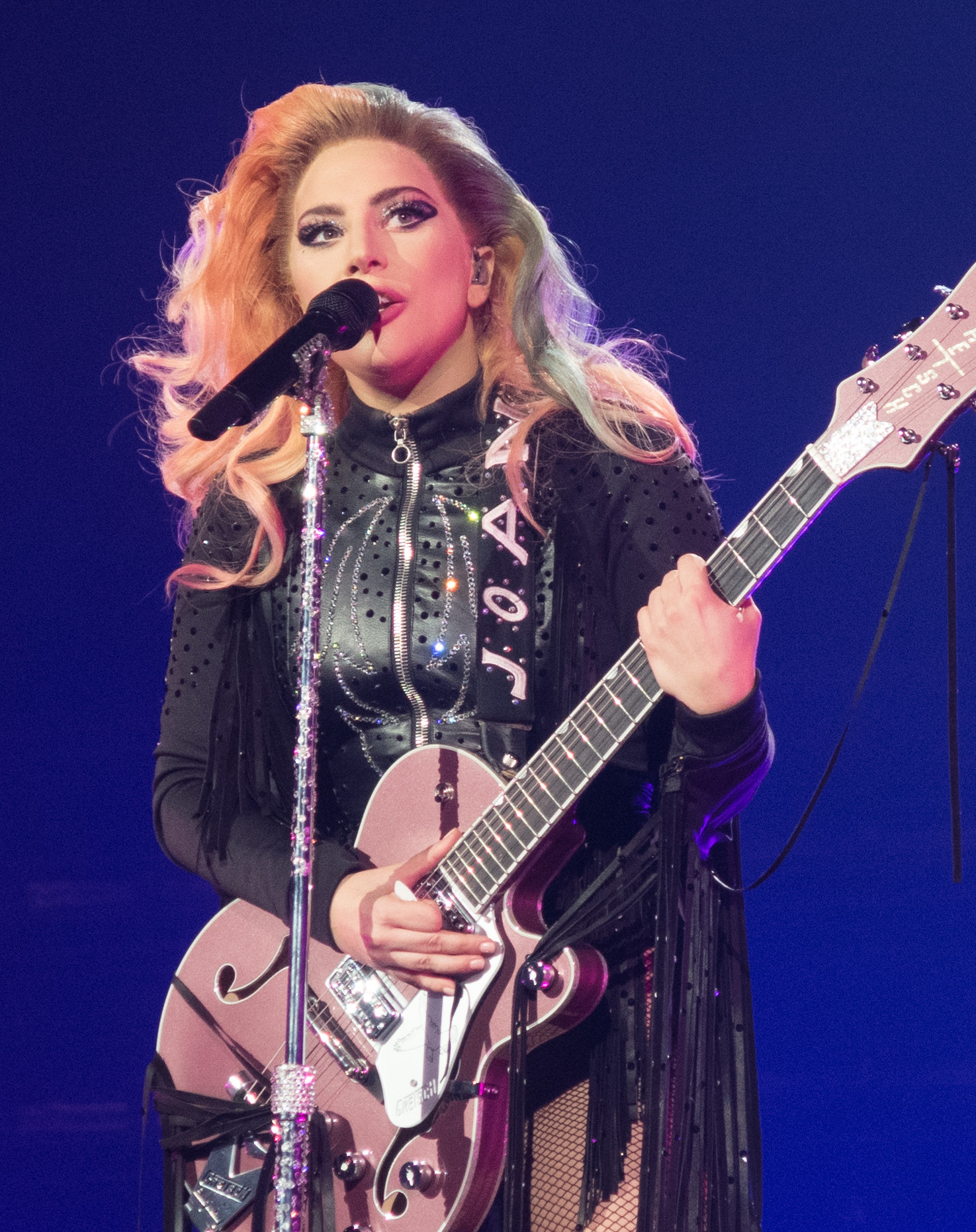
Five-time nominee Lady Gaga is the most awarded act, and the first to win multiple times since the category's revamp, winning in 2019, 2021 and 2025.

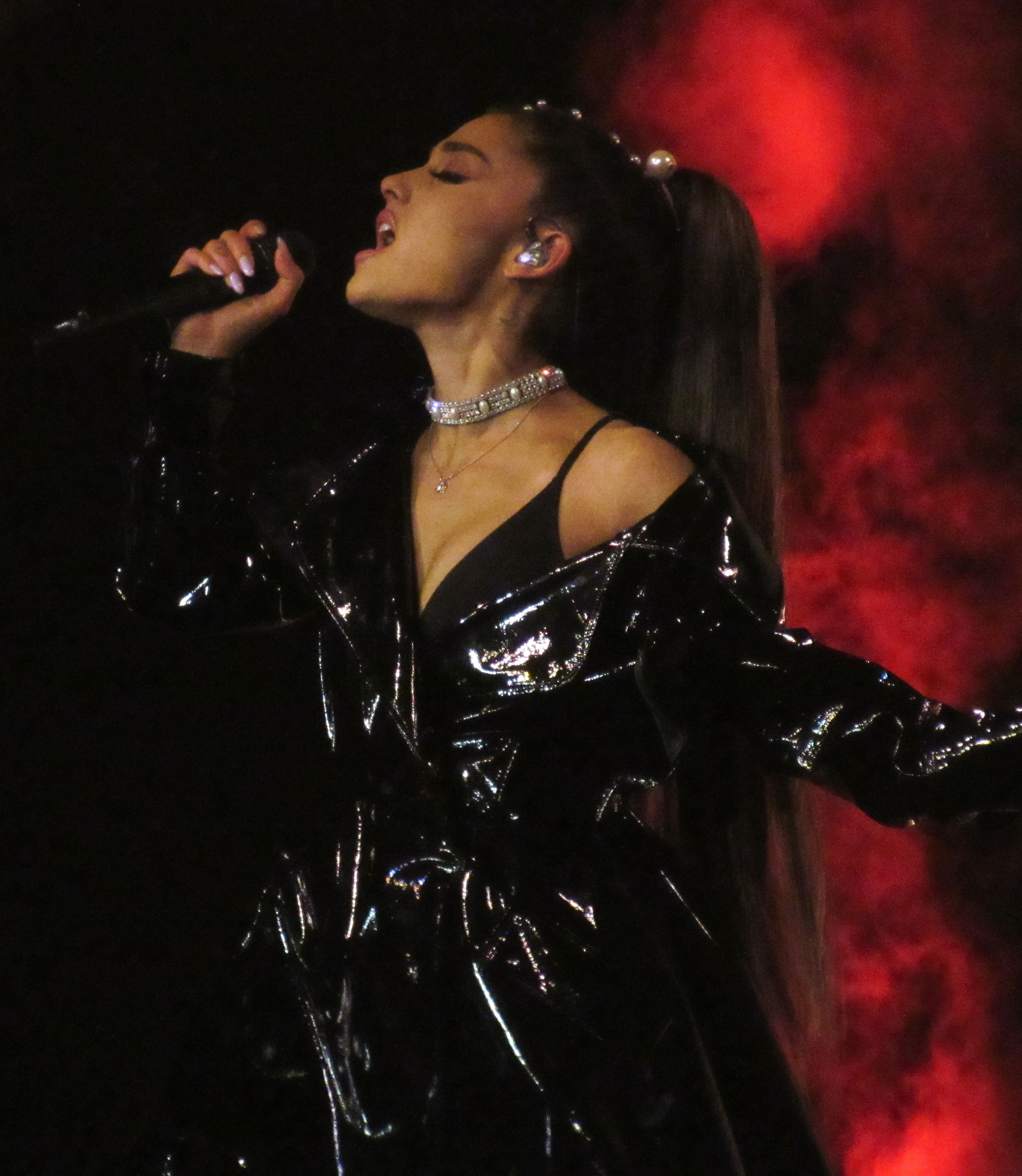
Ariana Grande is tied for the most nominations with five, winning in 2021 and 2026. "Rain on Me" with Lady Gaga was the first all-female collaboration to win this category.

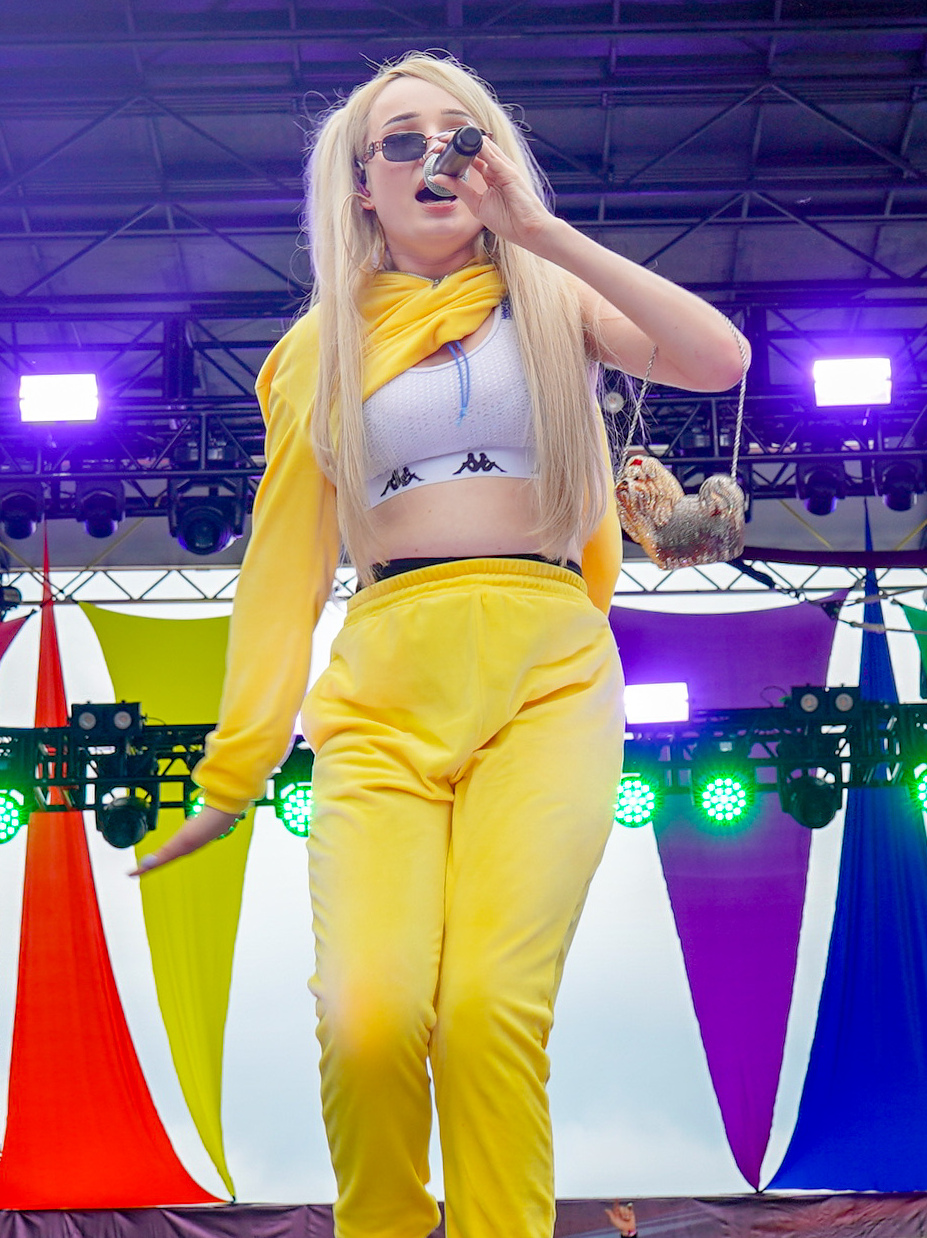
2023 winner Kim Petras became the first openly transgender artist to win this award.

=== 2010s ===
Year^{[I]}	Performing Artist	Work
2012
2012	Tony Bennett and Amy Winehouse	"Body and Soul"
2012	The Black Keys	"Dearest"
2012	Coldplay	"Paradise"
2012	Foster the People	"Pumped Up Kicks"
2012	Maroon 5 featuring Christina Aguilera	"Moves Like Jagger"
2013
2013	Gotye featuring Kimbra	"Somebody That I Used to Know"
2013	Florence and the Machine	"Shake It Out"
2013	Fun featuring Janelle Monáe	"We Are Young"
2013	LMFAO	"Sexy and I Know It"
2013	Maroon 5 featuring Wiz Khalifa	"Payphone"
2014
2014	Daft Punk featuring Pharrell Williams and Nile Rodgers	"Get Lucky"
2014	Pink featuring Nate Ruess	"Just Give Me a Reason"
2014	Rihanna featuring Mikky Ekko	"Stay"
2014	Robin Thicke featuring T.I. and Pharrell Williams	"Blurred Lines"
2014	Justin Timberlake featuring Jay-Z	"Suit & Tie"
2015
2015	A Great Big World and Christina Aguilera	"Say Something"
2015	Iggy Azalea featuring Charli XCX	"Fancy"
2015	Coldplay	"A Sky Full of Stars"
2015	Jessie J, Ariana Grande and Nicki Minaj	"Bang Bang"
2015	Katy Perry featuring Juicy J	"Dark Horse"
2016
2016	Mark Ronson featuring Bruno Mars	"Uptown Funk"
2016	Florence and the Machine	"Ship to Wreck"
2016	Wiz Khalifa featuring Charlie Puth	"See You Again"
2016	Maroon 5	"Sugar"
2016	Taylor Swift featuring Kendrick Lamar	"Bad Blood"
2017
2017	Twenty One Pilots	"Stressed Out"
2017	The Chainsmokers featuring Halsey	"Closer"
2017	Lukas Graham	"7 Years"
2017	Rihanna featuring Drake	"Work"
2017	Sia featuring Sean Paul	"Cheap Thrills"
2018
2018	Portugal. The Man	"Feel It Still"
2018	The Chainsmokers and Coldplay	"Something Just like This"
2018	Luis Fonsi and Daddy Yankee featuring Justin Bieber	"Despacito"
2018	Imagine Dragons	"Thunder"
2018	Zedd and Alessia Cara	"Stay"
2019
2019	Lady Gaga and Bradley Cooper	"Shallow"
2019	Christina Aguilera featuring Demi Lovato	"Fall in Line"
2019	Backstreet Boys	"Don't Go Breaking My Heart"
2019	Tony Bennett and Diana Krall	"'S Wonderful"
2019	Maroon 5 featuring Cardi B	"Girls Like You"
2019	Justin Timberlake featuring Chris Stapleton	"Say Something"
2019	Zedd, Maren Morris and Grey	"The Middle"

=== 2020s ===
Year^{[I]}	Performing Artist	Work
2020
2020	Lil Nas X featuring Billy Ray Cyrus	"Old Town Road"
2020	Ariana Grande and Social House	"Boyfriend"
2020	Jonas Brothers	"Sucker"
2020	Post Malone and Swae Lee	"Sunflower"
2020	Shawn Mendes and Camila Cabello	"Señorita"
2021
2021	Lady Gaga and Ariana Grande	"Rain on Me"
2021	J Balvin, Dua Lipa, Bad Bunny and Tainy	"Un Día (One Day)"
2021	Justin Bieber featuring Quavo	"Intentions"
2021	BTS	"Dynamite"
2021	Taylor Swift featuring Bon Iver	"Exile"
2022
2022	Doja Cat featuring SZA	"Kiss Me More"
2022	Tony Bennett and Lady Gaga	"I Get a Kick Out of You"
2022	Justin Bieber and Benny Blanco	"Lonely"
2022	BTS	"Butter"
2022	Coldplay	"Higher Power"
2023
2023	Sam Smith and Kim Petras	"Unholy"
2023	ABBA	"Don't Shut Me Down"
2023	Camila Cabello featuring Ed Sheeran	"Bam Bam"
2023	Coldplay and BTS	"My Universe"
2023	Post Malone and Doja Cat	"I Like You (A Happier Song)"
2024
2024	SZA featuring Phoebe Bridgers	"Ghost in the Machine"
2024	Miley Cyrus featuring Brandi Carlile	"Thousand Miles"
2024	Lana Del Rey featuring Jon Batiste	"Candy Necklace"
2024	Labrinth featuring Billie Eilish	"Never Felt So Alone"
2024	Taylor Swift featuring Ice Spice	"Karma"
2025
2025	Lady Gaga and Bruno Mars	"Die with a Smile"
2025	Gracie Abrams featuring Taylor Swift	"Us."
2025	Beyoncé featuring Post Malone	"Levii's Jeans"
2025	Charli XCX featuring Billie Eilish	"Guess"
2025	Ariana Grande, Brandy and Monica	"The Boy Is Mine"
2026
2026	Cynthia Erivo and Ariana Grande	"Defying Gravity"
2026	Huntrix: Ejae, Audrey Nuna and Rei Ami	"Golden"
2026	Katseye	"Gabriela"
2026	Rosé and Bruno Mars	"APT."
2026	SZA featuring Kendrick Lamar	"30 for 30"
2027	Lady Gaga and Doechii	"Runway"
2027	Madonna and Sabrina Carpenter	"Bring Your Love"
2027	Raye featuring Hans Zimmer	"Click Clack Symphony"
2027	Taylor Swift featuring Sabrina Carpenter	"The Life of a Showgirl"
2027	Tame Impala and Jennie	"Dracula"

^{^[I]} Each year is linked to the article about the Grammy Awards held that year.

== Artists with multiple wins ==
3 wins

- Lady Gaga

2 wins

- Ariana Grande
- Bruno Mars
- SZA

== Artists with multiple nominations ==
5 nominations

- Coldplay
- Ariana Grande
- Lady Gaga
- Taylor Swift

4 nominations

- Maroon 5

3 nominations

- Christina Aguilera
- Tony Bennett
- Justin Bieber
- BTS
- Post Malone
- Bruno Mars
- SZA

2 nominations

- Camila Cabello
- Sabrina Carpenter
- The Chainsmokers
- Charli XCX
- Doja Cat
- Billie Eilish
- Florence and the Machine
- Wiz Khalifa
- Kendrick Lamar
- Rihanna
- Nate Ruess
- Justin Timberlake
- Pharrell Williams
- Zedd
