= Social House =

American pop duo

- Born: May 14, 1987 (age 39), May 30, 1992 (age 34)
- Origin: Pittsburgh, Pennsylvania, US
- Genres: R&B; pop; hip hop
- Occupations: Musicians; singers; songwriters; producers
- Years active: 2015–present
- Labels: School Boy; Republic
- Members: Michael Foster; Charles Anderson
- Website: www.socialhouseonline.com

Social House is an American musical duo from Pittsburgh, Pennsylvania. As of 2025, the duo has released thirteen singles and two EPs.

== History ==
Michael "Mikey" Foster and Charles "Scootie" Anderson formed Social House in 2015 after moving to Los Angeles from Pittsburgh. They worked in the same production studio and named themselves after the WiFi network of the house in which they lived. They started out writing and producing songs for other artists, including Ariana Grande, Meghan Trainor, Jennifer Lopez, Chris Brown, Steven Malcolm and NCT 127. After their individual careers began to slow down the duo was successfully encouraged by their peers to collaborate on a new music project. In 2018, Social House was signed to a joint venture between the labels Scooter Braun, TBHits, and Interscope Records. Social House released their debut single "Magic in the Hamptons" featuring rapper Lil Yachty on June 8, 2018. Written about The Hamptons, the song has had over 450 million streams on Spotify. On September 28, 2018, their second single, entitled "Higher", was released. Social House released "Boyfriend" with Ariana Grande in August 2019.

== Awards and nominations ==
Year	Award	Category	Nominee	Result	Ref.
2019	2019 MTV Video Music Awards	Song of Summer	"Boyfriend" (with Ariana Grande)	Won	
2020	62nd Annual Grammy Awards	Best Pop Duo/Group Performance	"Boyfriend" (with Ariana Grande)	Nominated	
2020	62nd Annual Grammy Awards	Record of the Year	"7 Rings"	Nominated	

== Touring and performances ==
On November 5, 2018, pop star Ariana Grande announced Social House and Normani would be joining her on Sweetener World Tour.

== Discography ==
=== Extended plays ===
List of extended plays
Title	Details	Peak chart positions		
Title	Details	US	CAN	LIT
Everything Changed...	Released: August 9, 2019; Labels: School Boy, Republic; Format: Digital download, streaming	56	33	95

=== Singles ===
==== As lead artist ====
List of singles as lead artist
Title	Year	Peak chart positions									Certifications	Album
Title	Year	US	AUS	CAN	GER	IRE	NOR	NZ	SWE	UK	Certifications	Album
"Magic in the Hamptons" (featuring Lil Yachty)	2018	— (Note: "Magic in the Hamptons" did not enter the Billboard Hot 100, but peaked at number 25 on the Bubbling Under Hot 100 Singles chart.)	—	91	—	32	—	—	—	—	RIAA: Gold; BPI: Silver	Non-album singles
"Higher"	2018	—	—	—	—	—	—	—	—	—		Non-album singles
"Haunt You"	2019	—	—	—	—	—	—	—	—	—		Everything Changed...
"Boyfriend" (with Ariana Grande)	2019	8	4	5	23	3	16	4	18	4	RIAA: Platinum; ARIA: 3× Platinum; BPI: Platinum; GLF: Gold; IFPI NOR: Gold; MC: Platinum; RMNZ: Gold	Everything Changed...
"Electric"	2020	—	—	—	—	—	—	—	—	—		Non-album single
"—" denotes a recording that did not chart or was not released in that territory.

==== As featured artist ====
List of singles as featured artist, with selected chart positions
Title	Year	Peak chart positions	Album
Title	Year	US Dance	Album
"Don't Kill My High" (Lost Kings featuring Wiz Khalifa and Social House)	2019	21	Paper Crowns

=== Music videos ===
List of music videos, showing year released and directors
Title	Year	Other artist(s)	Director(s)	Ref.
As lead artist
"Magic in the Hamptons" (Lyric video)	2018	Lil Yachty	Unknown	
"Magic in the Hamptons"	2018	Lil Yachty	Cole Bennett	
"Magic in the Hamptons" (Vertical video)	2018	Lil Yachty	Unknown	
"Haunt You" (Lyric video)	2019	None	Parsa Ara	
"Haunt You"	2019	None	Austin Simkins	
"Boyfriend"	2019	Ariana Grande	Hannah Lux Davis	
"Boyfriend" (Lyric video)	2019	Ariana Grande	Katia Temkin	
As featured artist
"Don't Kill My High"	2019	Lost Kings, Wiz Khalifa	Roxana Baldovin	

=== Songwriting and production credits ===
Year	Artist(s)	Song(s)	Album(s)	Co-writer	Producer	Ref.
2018	Ariana Grande	"Goodnight n Go"	Sweetener	check	check	
2018	Ariana Grande	"Pete Davidson"	Sweetener	check	check	
2019	Ariana Grande	"NASA"	Thank U, Next	check	check	
2019	Ariana Grande	"7 Rings"	Thank U, Next	check	check	
2019	Ariana Grande	"Thank U, Next"	Thank U, Next	check	check	
2019	Ariana Grande and Victoria Monét	"Monopoly"	Non-album single	check	check	
2019	NCT 127	"Highway to Heaven"	We Are Superhuman	check	(co.)	
2019	NCT 127	"Jet Lag" (시차)	We Are Superhuman	check	(co.)	
2020	Ariana Grande	"Shut Up"	Positions	check		
2020	Ariana Grande	"My Hair"	Positions	check	(co.)	
2023	NCT U	"Interlude: Oasis"	Golden Age	check	(co.)	
