= Sunshine (Latto song) =

2022 single by Latto featuring Lil Wayne and Childish Gambino

Single by Latto featuring Lil Wayne and Childish Gambino

from the album 777
- Released: April 26, 2022
- Genre: Hip hop; trap
- Length: 3:26
- Label: Streamcut; RCA
- Songwriters: Alyssa Stephens; Sage Skolfield; Sean Solymar; Dwayne Carter, Jr.; Donald Glover; Anthony Clemons, Jr.; Philip Cornish; Luke Crowder; Uforo Ebong
- Producers: Ant Clemons; BongoByTheWay; Crowder; Mike Dean

Latto singles chronology
"Big Energy" (remix)	"Sunshine" (2022)	"Naked" (remix) (2022)

Lil Wayne singles chronology
"We Set the Trends (Remix)" (2022)	"Sunshine" (2022)	"Never Fake It" (2022)

Childish Gambino singles chronology
"Baby Girl" (2022)	"Sunshine" (2022)

"Sunshine" is a song by American rapper Latto from her second studio album 777 (2022). It features American rappers Lil Wayne and Childish Gambino. Produced by Ant Clemons, BongoByTheWay, Luke Crowder, and Mike Dean, the song was sent to US rhythmic contemporary radio on April 26, 2022, as the album's fourth single.

== Background ==
Latto told Apple Music about how the collaboration came about:

I still can't even believe that I got them both on the song. I had originally recorded it as a solo song, but I felt like it was bigger than me. I wanted a feature on it. So, I'm thinking out loud. I'm thinking of very "artistic" artists. I want somebody who has a universal sound and someone who can go more in-depth and play on the word "sunshine". Who is the clever rapper? I'm thinking of these names and I'm shooting for the stars. And to my surprise, both of them did the song request, which is like huge, huge, huge. I'm still a new artist. I'm from Atlanta, so Childish is extra special, and I just grew up on Wayne.

In an interview with Complex, Latto said that they did not record in the studio together; instead, her team sent the song to her collaborators. She added, "I was pretty much just shooting for the stars, like, 'I hope they can do it. If not, no pressure. I understand.' But they both actually sent verses back, so that was super cool. A Childish Gambino verse is rare as hell anyway, so that was super dope within itself. And then Wayne is just a GOAT, so that's super dope, too. To be stamped by them at this early stage in my career, it meant a lot."

== Composition ==
Latto has described the song's musical style as "hood gospel"; in that same interview with Complex, she stated,

It's very artistic. It's a fresh sound, fresh topic. It feels good. I personally think this sound on "Sunshine" could be a movie soundtrack, or on a TV show. It just feels so good. I could see it being background music for so many different scenes, and I think it's very commercial. Your grandma can listen to it or your ratchet cousin that stays in the hood.

The production of the song contains brass and backing choir vocals. Lyrically, "Sunshine" focuses on the artists' successes as they challenge their enemies. In the chorus, Latto half-sings and half-raps about people who were disloyal to her during her come-up: "Pray for my enemies, Lord, I need clarity / They ain't got empathy for me, they stare at me / They used my couch when they needed the therapy / Took what they needed but never took care of me / They saw a dollar sign, treat me like currency / Kill all they hopes and dreams if they want murder me / Sunshine on me". She continues her verse with a melodic delivery and criticism to her haters, in addition to a triple entendre with regard to Stevie Wonder and Wonder Bread ("These niggas Stevie to the come up / Went got my bread up, let 'em wonder") and wordplay in reference to the song "Frontin'" by Pharrell Williams ("Big Latto for real, I ain't never done fronted"). The following verse is performed by Lil Wayne, who references Phoenix Suns basketball player Devin Booker and the Chris Rock–Will Smith slapping incident ("This Siggy get jiggy with niggas / Don't make me Will Smith me a nigga"). Childish Gambino provides the last verse, in which he acknowledges his absence in the rap game over the past few years ("I'm sweeter at rapping like what the fuck happened? / Came back and he's snapping, came back with a passion").

== Critical reception ==
The song was well-received by music critics. Alex Zidel of HotNewHipHop commented that the three rappers "deliver some of their best individual contributions of the year", also writing, "Latto lets the sunshine brighten up her day on the new song". Eddie Fu of Consequence wrote that Lil Wayne's verse "isn't anything special" given the "high standards" he has set, "but his presence speaks volumes". Fu went on to state, "'Sunshine' isn't an instant hit, but represents Latto's level-up". Writing for Stereogum, Chris DeVille commented the artists "jibe quite nicely" over the production, adding that Childish Gambino "sounds especially comfortable gliding over the soulful, swaying beat". Armon Sadler of Vibe particularly praised Latto's melodic ability and Gambino's "shapeshifting flows" in the closing verse, before writing, "BongoByTheWay provided the ideal canvas, and this trio produced a masterpiece. How can you not feel empowered?"

== Live performances ==
Latto performed the song on The Tonight Show Starring Jimmy Fallon (in a medley with her song "Big Energy") on April 7, 2022 and on Vevo Lift on September 14, 2022.

== Charts ==
Chart performance for "Sunshine"
Chart (2022)	Peak position
New Zealand Hot Singles (RMNZ)	33
US Bubbling Under Hot 100 (Billboard)	25
