= MTV Video Music Award for Song of Summer =

Annual music video award

- "Hate That I Made You Love Me" by Ariana Grande is the most recent recipient.
- Awarded for: Summer hits
- Country: United States
- Presented by: MTV
- First award: 2013
- Currently held by: Ariana Grande – "Hate That I Made You Love Me" (2026)

Highlights
- Most wins: Ariana Grande (2)
- Most nominations: Justin Bieber (8)
- Website: VMA website

The MTV Video Music Award for Song of Summer is an award handed out at the yearly MTV Video Music Awards, first introduced at the 2013 ceremony. It is a social media voted award to crown the song of the summer as determined by fans online. The nominees were usually announced in late August or early September after the main nominees were announced.

The award was briefly retired in 2014, the year after its creation, before returning the following year in 2015. The award has been given each year subsequently.

The first winner of the category was One Direction with "Best Song Ever". Ariana Grande has the most wins with two awards, while Justin Bieber is the most nominated artist with eight in this category.

== Recipients ==
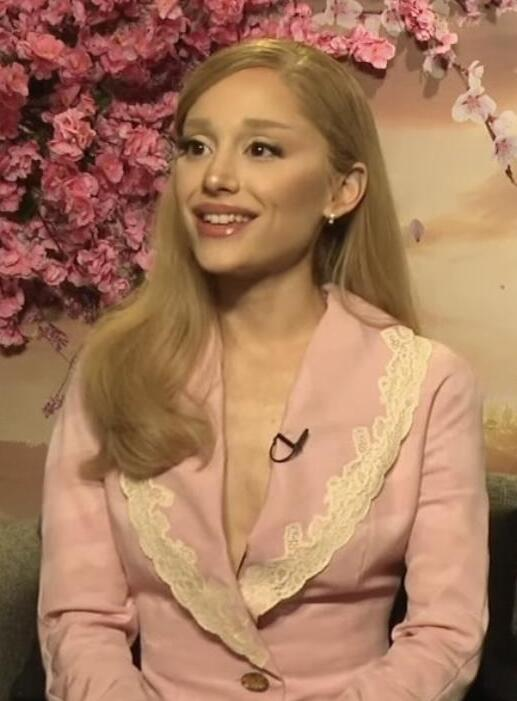
Ariana Grande is the category's most awarded artist, winning two times: "Boyfriend" (2019) and "Hate That I Made You Love Me" (2026).

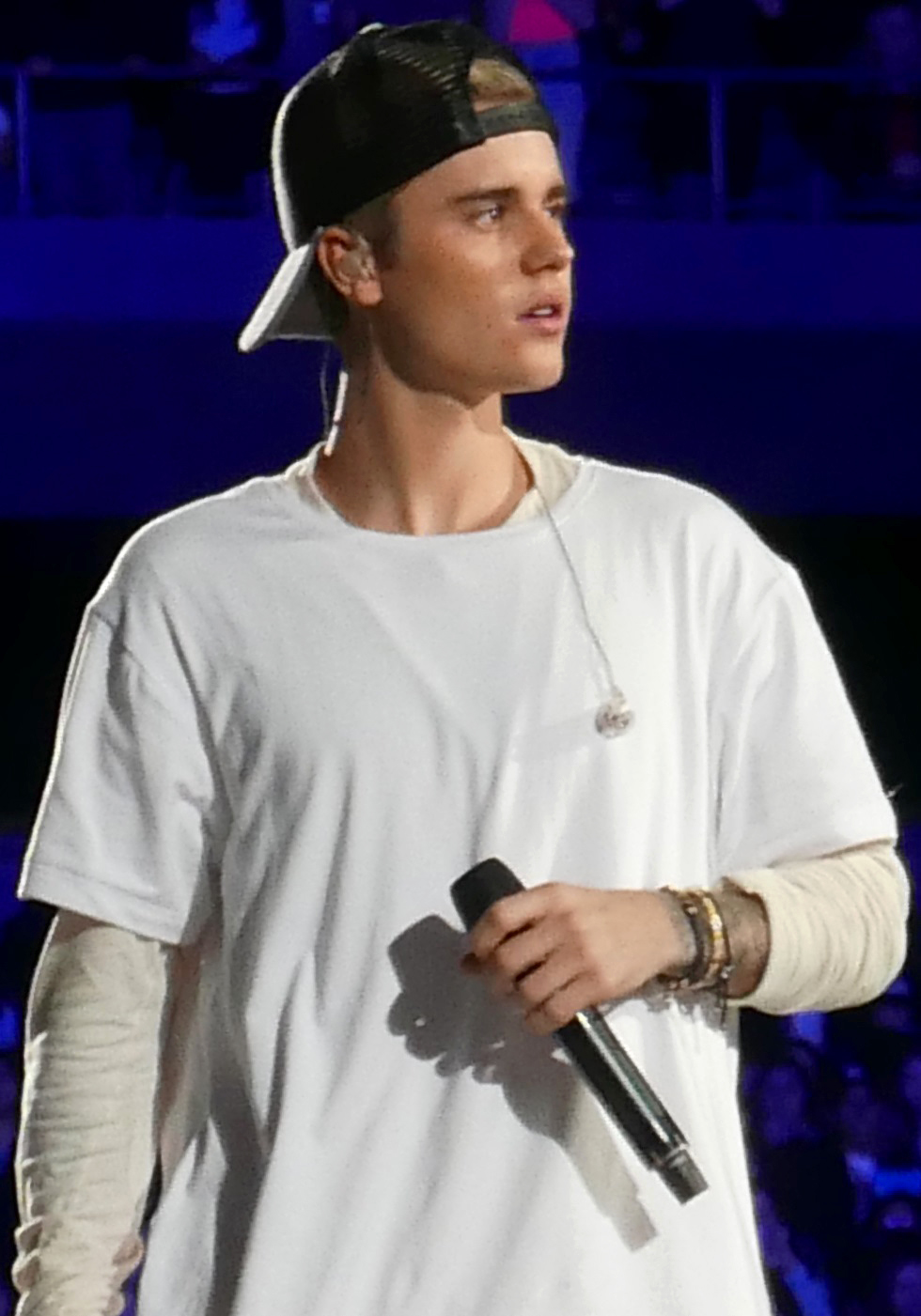
Justin Bieber is the most nominated artist of the category with eight.

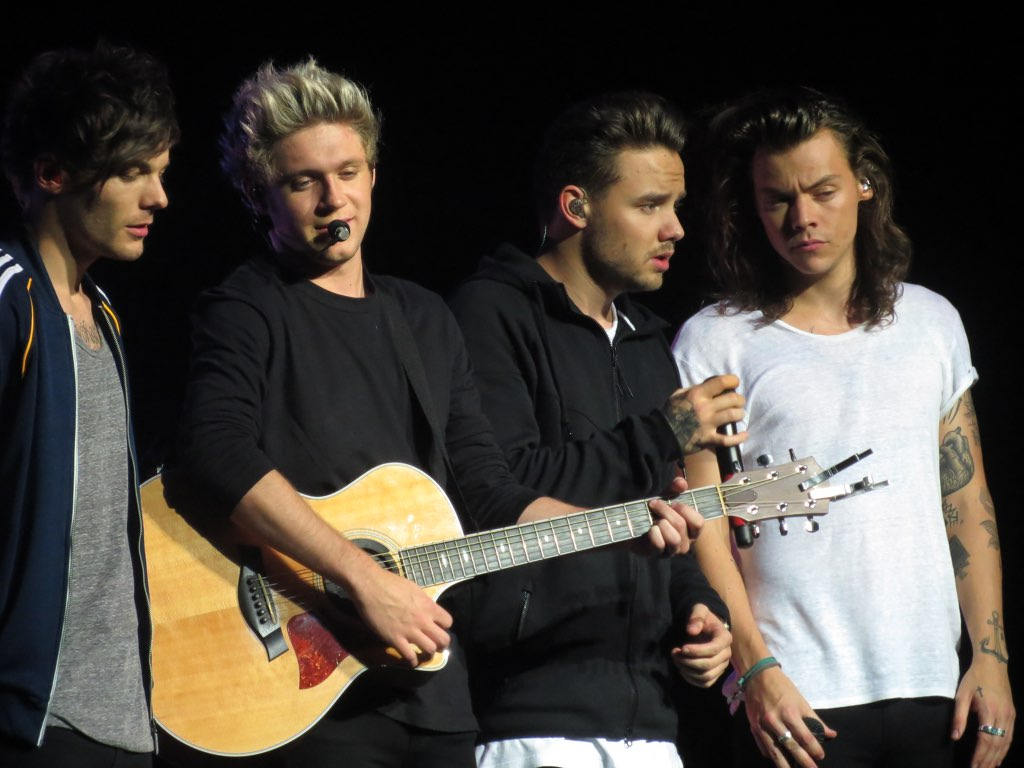
One Direction were the first recipients of the award with "Best Song Ever" in 2013.

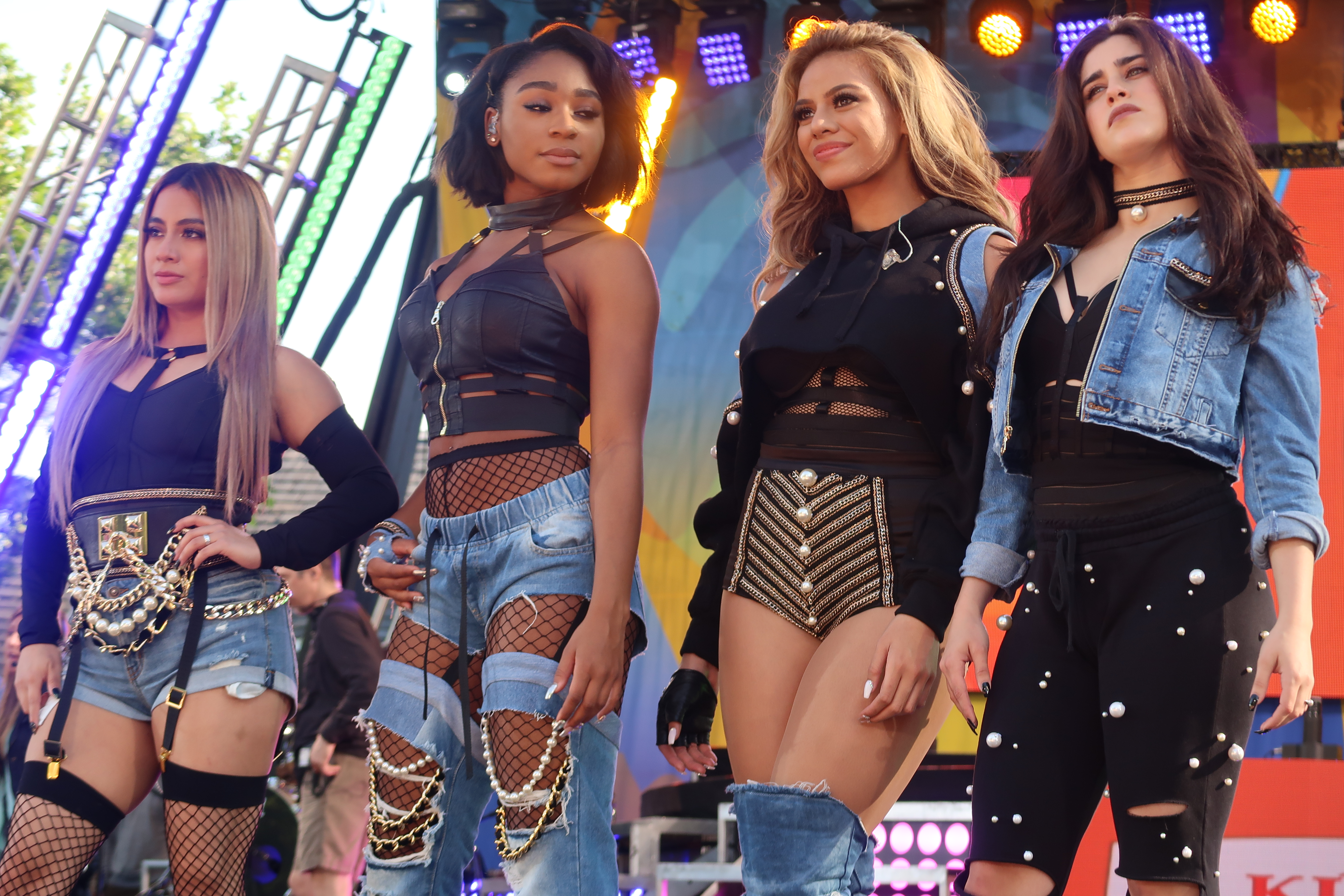
Fifth Harmony was the first girl group and the first female act to win the category with "All in My Head (Flex)" in 2016.

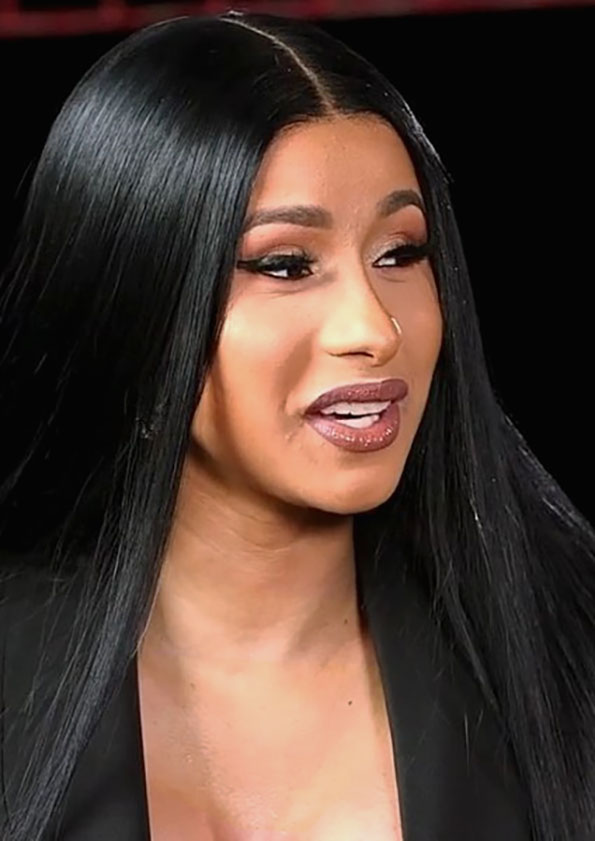
Cardi B received five nominations in the category, becoming the first and only female rapper to win with "I Like It" in 2018.

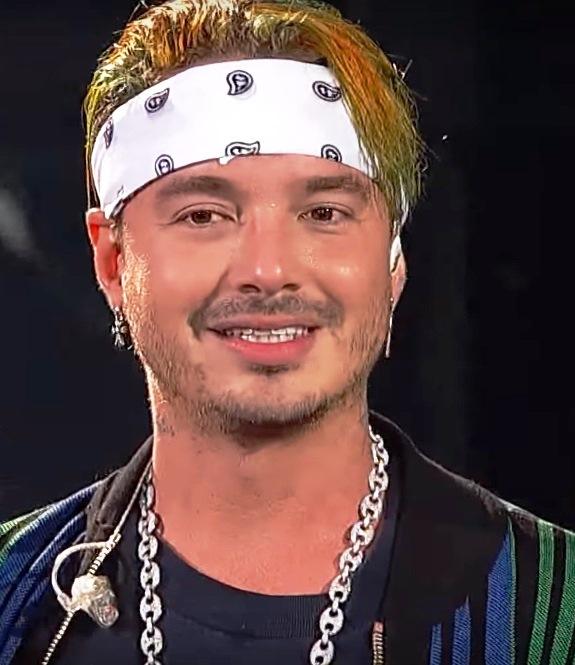
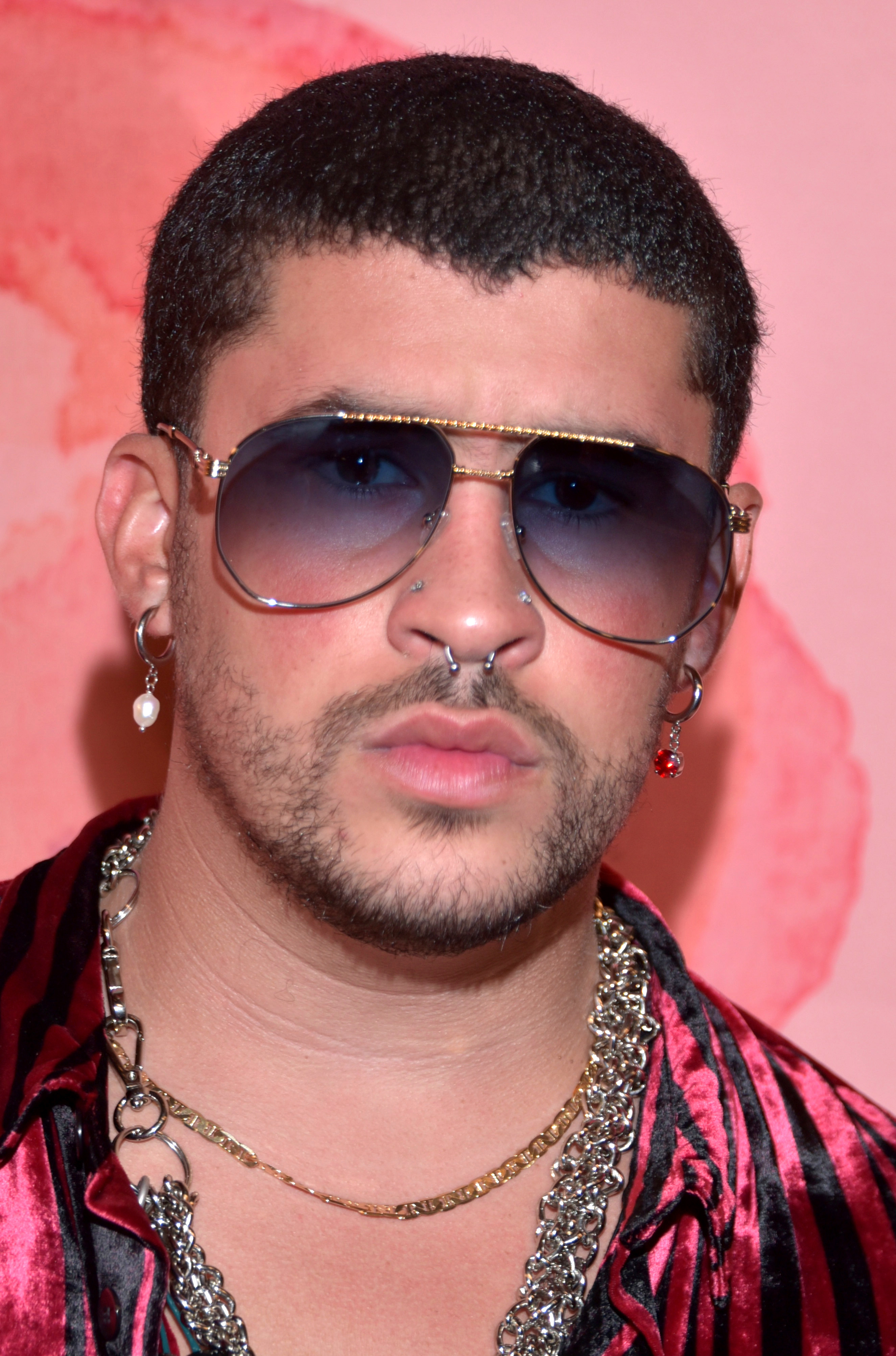
J Balvin (left) and Bad Bunny (right) were the first Latin artists to win the category with their Cardi B collaboration "I Like It" in 2018.

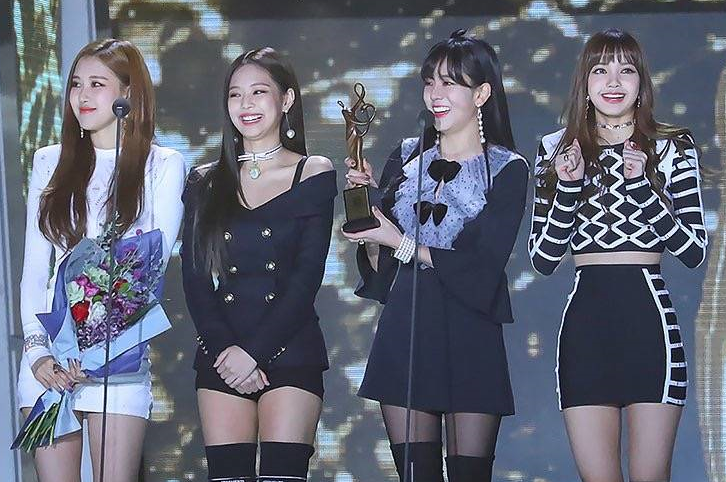
Blackpink was the first Korean act to win the category with "How You Like That" in 2020.

=== 2010s ===
Recipients
Year (Note: Each year is linked to the article about the MTV Video Music Awards held that year.)	Winner(s)	Video	Nominees	Ref.
2013	One Direction	"Best Song Ever"	Miley Cyrus – "We Can't Stop"; Daft Punk (featuring Pharrell Williams) – "Get Lucky"; Selena Gomez – "Come & Get It"; Calvin Harris (featuring Ellie Goulding) – "I Need Your Love"; Robin Thicke (featuring T.I and Pharrell) – "Blurred Lines"	
2014	—N/a			
2015	5 Seconds of Summer	"She's Kinda Hot"	Fetty Wap – "My Way"; Fifth Harmony – "Worth It"; Selena Gomez (featuring ASAP Rocky) – "Good for You"; David Guetta (featuring Nicki Minaj, Bebe Rexha & Afrojack) – "Hey Mama"; Demi Lovato – "Cool for the Summer"; Major Lazer – "Lean On"; OMI – "Cheerleader"; Silentó – "Watch Me (Whip/Nae Nae)"; Skrillex and Diplo (featuring Justin Bieber) – "Where Are Ü Now"; Taylor Swift – "Bad Blood"; The Weeknd – "Can't Feel My Face"	
2016	Fifth Harmony (featuring Fetty Wap)	"All in My Head (Flex)"	The Chainsmokers (featuring Halsey) – "Closer"; Drake (featuring WizKid and Kyla) – "One Dance"; Selena Gomez – "Kill Em with Kindness"; Calvin Harris (featuring Rihanna) – "This Is What You Came For"; Nick Jonas (featuring Ty Dolla Sign) – "Bacon"; Kent Jones – "Don't Mind"; Major Lazer (featuring Justin Bieber and MØ) – "Cold Water"; Sia – "Cheap Thrills"; Justin Timberlake – "Can't Stop the Feeling!"	
2017	Lil Uzi Vert	"XO Tour Llif3"	Camila Cabello (featuring Quavo) – "OMG"; DJ Khaled (featuring Rihanna and Bryson Tiller) – "Wild Thoughts"; Fifth Harmony (featuring Gucci Mane) – "Down"; Luis Fonsi and Daddy Yankee (featuring Justin Bieber) – "Despacito (Remix)"; Demi Lovato – "Sorry Not Sorry"; Shawn Mendes – "There's Nothing Holdin' Me Back"; Ed Sheeran – "Shape of You"	
2018	Cardi B, Bad Bunny and J Balvin	"I Like It"	DJ Khaled (featuring Justin Bieber, Chance the Rapper and Quavo) – "No Brainer"; Drake – "In My Feelings"; Calvin Harris and Dua Lipa – "One Kiss"; Juice Wrld – "Lucid Dreams"; Ella Mai – "Boo'd Up"; Maroon 5 (featuring Cardi B) – "Girls Like You"; Post Malone – "Better Now"	
2019	Ariana Grande and Social House	"Boyfriend"	The Chainsmokers and Bebe Rexha – "Call You Mine"; Miley Cyrus – "Mother's Daughter"; DaBaby – "Suge"; Billie Eilish – "Bad Guy"; Jonas Brothers – "Sucker"; Khalid – "Talk"; Lil Nas X (featuring Billy Ray Cyrus) – "Old Town Road"; Lil Tecca – "Ransom"; Lizzo – "Truth Hurts"; Shawn Mendes and Camila Cabello – "Señorita"; Post Malone (featuring Young Thug) – "Goodbyes"; Rosalía and J Balvin (featuring El Guincho) – "Con Altura"; Ed Sheeran and Justin Bieber – "I Don't Care"; Taylor Swift – "You Need to Calm Down"; Young Thug (featuring J. Cole and Travis Scott) – "The London"	

=== 2020s ===
Recipients
Year	Winner(s)	Video	Nominees	Ref.
2020	Blackpink	"How You Like That"	Cardi B (featuring Megan Thee Stallion) – "WAP"; Miley Cyrus – "Midnight Sky"; DaBaby (featuring Roddy Ricch) – "Rockstar"; DJ Khaled (featuring Drake) – "Popstar"; Doja Cat – "Say So"; Jack Harlow – "Whats Poppin"; Lil Baby (featuring 42 Dugg) – "We Paid"; Dua Lipa – "Break My Heart"; Megan Thee Stallion (featuring Beyoncé) – "Savage (Remix)"; Pop Smoke (featuring 50 Cent and Roddy Ricch) – "The Woo"; Saint Jhn – "Roses"; Saweetie – "Tap In"; Harry Styles – "Watermelon Sugar"; Taylor Swift – "Cardigan"; The Weeknd – "Blinding Lights"	
2021	BTS	"Butter"	Justin Bieber (featuring Daniel Caesar and Giveon) – "Peaches"; Camila Cabello – "Don't Go Yet"; DJ Khaled (featuring Lil Baby and Lil Durk) – "Every Chance I Get"; Doja Cat – "Need to Know"; Billie Eilish – "Happier Than Ever"; Giveon – "Heartbreak Anniversary"; The Kid Laroi with Justin Bieber – "Stay"; Lil Nas X (featuring Jack Harlow) – "Industry Baby"; Dua Lipa – "Levitating"; Lizzo (featuring Cardi B) – "Rumors"; Megan Thee Stallion – "Thot Shit"; Shawn Mendes and Tainy – "Summer of Love"; Normani (featuring Cardi B) – "Wild Side"; Olivia Rodrigo – "Good 4 U"; Ed Sheeran – "Bad Habits"	
2022	Jack Harlow	"First Class"	Bad Bunny and Chencho Corleone – "Me Porto Bonito"; Beyoncé – "Break My Soul"; Kane Brown – "Grand"; Doja Cat – "Vegas"; Future featuring Drake and Tems – "Wait for U"; Steve Lacy – "Bad Habit"; Latto and Mariah Carey featuring DJ Khaled – "Big Energy (Remix)"; Lizzo – "About Damn Time"; Post Malone featuring Doja Cat – "I Like You (A Happier Song)"; Marshmello and Khalid – "Numb"; Nicki Minaj – "Super Freaky Girl"; Charlie Puth featuring Jungkook of BTS – "Left and Right"; Rosalía – "Bizcochito"; Harry Styles – "Late Night Talking"; Nicky Youre and dazy – "Sunroof"	
2023	Jungkook (featuring Latto)	"Seven"	Beyoncé – "Cuff It"; Luke Combs – "Fast Car"; Doechii (featuring Kodak Black) – "What It Is (Block Boy)"; Doja Cat – "Paint the Town Red"; Billie Eilish – "What Was I Made For?"; Dua Lipa – "Dance the Night"; Fifty Fifty – "Cupid"; Gunna – "FukUMean"; Nicki Minaj and Ice Spice (with Aqua) – "Barbie World"; Olivia Rodrigo – "Vampire"; Troye Sivan – "Rush"; Taylor Swift (featuring Ice Spice) – "Karma"; SZA – "Kill Bill"; Tomorrow X Together and Jonas Brothers – "Do It Like That"; Yng Lvcas and Peso Pluma – "La Bebé (Remix)"	
2024	Taylor Swift (featuring Post Malone)	"Fortnight"	Ariana Grande – "We Can't Be Friends (Wait for Your Love)"; Benson Boone – "Beautiful Things"; Billie Eilish – "Birds of a Feather"; Chappell Roan – "Good Luck, Babe!"; Charli XCX and Billie Eilish – "Guess featuring Billie Eilish"; Eminem – "Houdini"; Future, Metro Boomin and Kendrick Lamar – "Like That"; GloRilla and Megan Thee Stallion – "Wanna Be"; Hozier – "Too Sweet"; Kendrick Lamar – "Not Like Us"; Post Malone featuring Morgan Wallen – "I Had Some Help"; Sabrina Carpenter – "Please Please Please"; Shaboozey – "A Bar Song (Tipsy)"; SZA – "Saturn"; Tommy Richman – "Million Dollar Baby"	
2025	Tate McRae	"Just Keep Watching"	Addison Rae – "Headphones On"; Alex Warren – "Ordinary"; Benson Boone – "Mystical Magical"; BigXthaPlug featuring Bailey Zimmerman – "All the Way"; Chappell Roan – "The Subway"; Demi Lovato – "Fast"; Doja Cat – "Jealous Type"; Huntrix: Ejae, Audrey Nuna and Rei Ami – "Golden"; Jessie Murph – "Blue Strips"; Justin Bieber – "Daisies"; Moliy, Silent Addy, Skillibeng and Shenseea – "Shake It to the Max (Fly) (remix)"; Morgan Wallen featuring Tate McRae – "What I Want"; Ravyn Lenae featuring Rex Orange County – "Love Me Not"; Sabrina Carpenter – "Manchild"; Sombr – "12 to 12"	
2026	Ariana Grande	"Hate That I Made You Love Me"	Bruno Mars – "Risk It All"; Charli XCX – "Camera"; Ella Langley – "Choosin' Texas"; Katseye – "Hootie Frutti"; Latto featuring Doja Cat – "Okayyy"; Morgan Wallen – "Been By Now"; Olivia Dean – "So Easy (To Fall in Love)"; Olivia Rodrigo – "Stupid Song"; Sabrina Carpenter – "House Tour"; Slayyyter – "Brand New Chanel$"; Sombr – "Homewrecker"; Stella Lefty – "Boston"; Tame Impala and Jennie – "Dracula"; Taylor Swift – "I Knew It, I Knew You"	

== Statistics ==
=== Artists with multiple wins ===
2 wins

- Ariana Grande
- Jungkook

=== Artists with multiple nominations ===
8 nominations

- Justin Bieber

7 nominations

- Doja Cat

6 nominations

- Taylor Swift

5 nominations

- Cardi B
- DJ Khaled
- Post Malone
- Taylor Swift
- Billie Eilish

4 nominations

- Drake
- Dua Lipa
- Megan Thee Stallion

3 nominations

- Beyoncé
- Miley Cyrus
- Selena Gomez
- Calvin Harris
- Shawn Mendes
- Nicki Minaj
- Lizzo
- Ed Sheeran
- Camila Cabello
- Fifth Harmony
- Jack Harlow
- Demi Lovato
- Ariana Grande
- Latto
- Morgan Wallen
- Olivia Rodrigo
- Sabrina Carpenter

2 nominations

- Future
- Jungkook
- Kendrick Lamar
- SZA
- The Weeknd
- Rihanna
- Bad Bunny
- Harry Styles
- Rosalía
- Lil Nas X
- Young Thug
- Ice Spice
- Giveon
- Jonas Brothers
- Pharrell Williams
- Khalid
- Lil Baby
- Roddy Ricch
- J Balvin
- Fetty Wap
- Quavo
- Major Lazer
- DaBaby
- The Chainsmokers
- Tate McRae
- Chappell Roan
- Benson Boone
- Charli XCX
- Sombr
