= Boyfriend (Ariana Grande and Social House song) =

2019 single by Ariana Grande and Social House

Single by Ariana Grande and Social House

from the EP Everything Changed...
- Released: August 2, 2019
- Recorded: May 2019
- Genre: Pop; R&B
- Length: 3:06
- Label: Republic
- Songwriters: Ariana Grande; Charles Anderson; Michael Foster; Edgar Barrera; Anthony M. Jones; Steven Franks; Tommy Brown
- Producers: Edgar Barrera; Steven Franks; Tommy Brown

Ariana Grande singles chronology
"Monopoly" (2019)	"Boyfriend" (2019)	"Don't Call Me Angel" (2019)

Social House singles chronology
"Haunt You" (2019)	"Boyfriend" (2019)	"Electric" (2020)

Music video
- "Boyfriend" on YouTube

"Boyfriend" is a song by American singer-songwriter Ariana Grande and American musical duo Social House. It was released by Republic Records on August 2, 2019. It is the second single from the latter's debut extended play, Everything Changed... (2019). It became Grande's 14th and Social House's first top 10 on the Billboard Hot 100. It also became the first song by a woman, and third overall, to top the Rolling Stone Top 100 Songs chart, achieving it in its debut week. It won the MTV Video Music Award for Song of Summer, and was nominated for the Grammy Award for Best Pop Duo/Group Performance.

== Background ==
The song was first teased by Grande on her social media on July 24, 2019, when she posted a picture of herself on a video set. She followed up the posts with pictures from the same video set, revealing the song to be a collaboration with Social House. Grande hinted at the title of the song on July 29, 2019, with the caption "u ain't my boyfriend". The first teaser was posted a day later. The cover art was revealed by Grande on her social media on July 30, 2019, and the song was simultaneously made available for pre-save.

== Composition ==
The song is written in the key of B♭ minor, and it follows the chord progression of G♭_{maj13}—F_{7}—B♭m_{11}—E♭m_{9}—F_{7}. Grande's vocals span from a low A♭_{3} to a high F_{5}.

== Critical reception ==
Billboard's Jason Lipshutz called "Boyfriend" an "elastic pop track, a lovably low-stakes ode to romantic attraction but resistance to traditional labels". Amanda Mitchell of O, The Oprah Magazine opined that the song's lyrics "will hit home for anyone who's ever wanted to be coupled-up, but also enjoyed the freedom of not being in a relationship. It's the theme song for those who fear commitment—despite wanting to be someone's girlfriend". Writing for Esquire, Gabrielle Bruney stated that it is "a completely undeniable bop", adding that it is "an effortlessly hooky R&B-pop hybrid" which "captures that torturous liminal phase in relationships, before boundaries and definitions have been set in stone, but when feelings are still very much on the line".

== Music video ==
The music video was directed by Hannah Lux Davis and was released alongside the song on August 2, 2019. In the video, Grande and Foster portray a dysfunctional couple seeking counseling from Anderson as they sing the song. Intermittent scenes show Grande and Foster at a party and both seeing the other flirt with other people. They each jealously fantasize about violently attacking their partner's other love interests: Grande tackles and beats one girl and pins another girl to a door by shooting an arrow into her palm; Foster kicks a guy in the face and pulls out his still-beating heart, giving it to Grande. Another sequence involves Grande pulling open her blazer and firing lasers shaped like pink hearts out of her bra, getting Foster's attention. The video ends with the couple passionately making out in the bathroom and subsequently destroying it. Anderson finds them, seemingly giving up on the couple and leaving them to their own devices. The video has since garnered over 267 million views as of May 2025.

== Accolades ==
Year	Organization	Award	Result	Ref.
2019	MTV Video Music Award	Song of Summer	Won	
2020	Grammy Awards	Best Pop Duo/Group Performance	Nominated	

== Live performances ==
The song was first performed live by Grande and Social House at Grande's performance at Lollapalooza on August 4, 2019, with Social House. Grande later added the song to the European leg of her Sweetener World Tour.

== Credits and personnel ==
Credits adapted from Tidal.

- Ariana Grande – vocals, songwriter, vocal producer, vocal arranger
- Charles Anderson – vocals, songwriter
- Michael Foster – vocals, songwriter
- Edgar Barrera – producer, songwriter, programmer
- Anthony M. Jones - producer, songwriter, programmer
- Steven Franks – producer, songwriter, programmer
- Tommy Brown – producer, songwriter, programmer
- Tarron Crayton – bass guitar
- Serban Ghenea – mixer, studio personnel
- John Hanes – mix engineer, studio personnel

== Charts ==
=== Weekly charts ===
Chart (2019)	Peak position
Argentina (Argentina Hot 100)	80
Australia (ARIA)	4
Austria (Ö3 Austria Top 40)	17
Belgium (Ultratop 50 Flanders)	33
Belgium (Ultratop 50 Wallonia)	18
Canada Hot 100 (Billboard)	5
China Airplay/FL (Billboard)	3
Colombia (National-Report)	69
Croatia (HRT)	12
Czech Republic Singles Digital (ČNS IFPI)	11
Denmark (Tracklisten)	20
Estonia (Eesti Ekspress)	3
Finland (Suomen virallinen lista)	12
France (SNEP)	53
Germany (GfK)	23
Greece (Billboard)	10
Hungary (Single Top 40)	3
Hungary (Stream Top 40)	4
Iceland (Tónlistinn)	1
Israel (Media Forest)	1
Ireland (IRMA)	3
Italy (FIMI)	57
Japan (Japan Hot 100)	38
Latvia (LAIPA)	3
Lithuania (AGATA)	3
Lebanon (The Official Lebanese Top 20)	13
Malaysia (RIM)	3
Mexico (Billboard Ingles Airplay)	36
Netherlands (Dutch Top 40)	33
Netherlands (Mega Top 50)	36
Netherlands (Single Top 100)	30
New Zealand (Recorded Music NZ)	7
Norway (VG-lista)	16
Poland Airplay (ZPAV)	62
Portugal (AFP)	19
Romania (Airplay 100)	96
Scotland Singles (Official Charts)	4
Singapore (RIAS)	2
Slovakia Singles Digital (ČNS IFPI)	1
South Korea (Gaon)	190
Spain (Promusicae)	64
Sweden (Sverigetopplistan)	18
Switzerland (Schweizer Hitparade)	13
UK Singles (Official Charts)	4
US Billboard Hot 100	8
US Adult Pop Airplay (Billboard)	23
US Dance Airplay (Billboard)	12
US Dance Club Songs (Billboard)	45
US Pop Airplay (Billboard)	8
US Rhythmic Airplay (Billboard)	10
US Rolling Stone Top 100	1

=== Year-end charts ===
Chart (2019)	Position
Canada (Canadian Hot 100)	77
Hungary (Stream Top 40)	74
Latvia (LAIPA)	89
Tokyo (Tokio Hot 100)	84
US Billboard Hot 100	98
US Mainstream Top 40 (Billboard)	44

== Certifications ==
Region	Certification	Certified units/sales
Australia (ARIA)	3× Platinum	210,000^{‡}
Austria (IFPI Austria)	Gold	15,000^{‡}
Brazil (Pro-Música Brasil)	Diamond	160,000^{‡}
Canada (Music Canada)	3× Platinum	240,000^{‡}
Denmark (IFPI Danmark)	Gold	45,000^{‡}
New Zealand (RMNZ)	2× Platinum	60,000^{‡}
Norway (IFPI Norway)	Gold	30,000^{‡}
Poland (ZPAV)	Platinum	50,000^{‡}
Portugal (AFP)	Gold	5,000^{‡}
United Kingdom (BPI)	Platinum	600,000^{‡}
United States (RIAA)	Platinum	1,000,000^{‡}
Streaming
Sweden (GLF)	Gold	6,000,000^{†}
^{‡} Sales+streaming figures based on certification alone.^{†} Streaming-only figures based on certification alone.

== Release history ==
Release dates and formats for "Boyfriend"
Region	Date	Format(s)	Label	Ref.
Various	August 2, 2019	Digital download; streaming	Republic	
Australia	August 2, 2019	Radio airplay	Republic	
Canada	August 2, 2019	Contemporary hit radio; hot adult contemporary radio	Republic	
Italy	August 2, 2019	Radio airplay	Universal	
United States	August 6, 2019	Contemporary hit radio; rhythmic contemporary radio	Republic	
Various	December 6, 2019	7-inch vinyl; 12-inch vinyl; cassette; CD	Republic	

== See also ==
- List of UK top-ten singles in 2019
- List of top 10 singles in 2019 (Australia)
- List of Billboard Hot 100 top-ten singles in 2019
- List of Rolling Stone Top 100 number-one songs of 2019
