= Magic in the Hamptons =

2018 single by Social House feat. Lil Yachty

Single by Social House featuring Lil Yachty
- Released: June 8, 2018
- Genre: Pop rap
- Length: 2:44
- Label: SB Projects; Interscope
- Songwriter(s): Charles Anderson; Michael Foster; Miles McCollum; Bianca Atterberry; Thomas Brown; Anton Göransson; Isabella Sjöstrand
- Producer(s): Foster; Göransson; TBHits

Social House singles chronology
"Magic in the Hamptons" (2018)	"Higher" (2018)

Lil Yachty singles chronology
"Pretender" (2018)	"Magic in the Hamptons" (2018)	"Who Want the Smoke?" (2018)

Music video
- "Magic in the Hamptons" on YouTube

"Magic in the Hamptons" is the debut single by American musical duo Social House, released on June 8, 2018 through SB Projects and Interscope Records. It features American rapper Lil Yachty. The song was produced by Mikey Foster of Social House, Anton Göransson and TBHits.

== Background ==
After finishing sessions one night, Social House was hanging out and had a few drinks with their friends Anton Göransson and Isabella Sjöstrand. They ended up writing a song that made them feel happy at the moment (which would become "Magic in the Hamptons"). The vocals were recorded in their bedroom closet. Their A&R found the song similar in style to that of Lil Yachty's music, so he sent it to record producer Coach K, who showed it to the rapper. Yachty quickly recorded and sent his verse to Social House. Neither member of the duo had been to the Hamptons before writing the song.

In an interview with The Prelude Press, Mikey Foster said the song is "about real love that can stand the test of time and make you feel young again." Scootie Anderson added, "It's an ode to real love. It's about a couple being so in love that they feel young again. It's about puppy love, the honeymoon phase in a relationship that never dies."

== Charts ==
Chart performance for "Magic in the Hamptons"
Chart (2018–2020)	Peak position
Canada (Canadian Hot 100)	91
Ireland (IRMA)	32
US Bubbling Under Hot 100 (Billboard)	25

== Certifications ==
Certifications for "Magic in the Hamptons"
Region	Certification	Certified units/sales
United Kingdom (BPI)	Silver	200,000^{‡}
United States (RIAA)	Gold	500,000^{‡}
^{‡} Sales+streaming figures based on certification alone.
