= 777 (Latto album) =

Studio album by Latto
- Released: March 25, 2022
- Recorded: 2020–2022
- Genre: Hip-hop
- Length: 32:54
- Labels: RCA; Streamcut
- Producers: Ant Clemons; Bankroll Got It; Beat Butcha; BongoByTheWay; BoogzDaBeast; Coop the Truth; D.A. Got That Dope; Diego Ave; Dis; Dr. Luke; FnZ; Hollywood Cole; jetsonmade; June James; Latto; Luke Crowder; Mike Dean; OG Parker; Pharrell Williams; Pooh Beatz; Romano; Sage Skolfield; Sean Solymar; Sonny Digital; TenRoc; Vaughn Oliver

Latto chronology
Queen of da Souf (2020)	777 (2022)	Sugar Honey Iced Tea (2024)

Singles from 777
- 1. "Big Energy" Released: September 24, 2021; 2. "Soufside" Released: November 5, 2021; 3. "Wheelie" Released: March 11, 2022; 4. "Sunshine" Released: April 26, 2022

777 is the second studio album by American rapper Latto. It was released through RCA Records and Streamcut on March 25, 2022. The album features guest appearances from 21 Savage, Lil Wayne, Childish Gambino, Lil Durk, Nardo Wick, and Kodak Black. Production on the album was handled by Sonny Digital, Dr. Luke, FnZ, jetsonmade, D.A. Got That Dope, and Pharrell Williams, among others. It serves as the follow-up to her debut studio album, Queen of da Souf (2020).

== Background ==
In an interview with Complex, Latto said that she was experimenting with various sounds and genres on the album to showcase her versatility, including pop, R&B, trap, and rhythmic vibes. She said that she had started working on it right after her previous album, Queen of da Souf (2020), and recorded the first song from the album in that year. She also explained why she chose the title of the album:

Seven is God's number, so it just started with that. From a younger age, seven has always been my favorite number. And then triple—it triumphs 666, or overcomes 666. It became a part of my brand when I changed my name to Latto in reference to the lottery and casino, hitting the jackpot is 777. But it already had a meaning to me. It just somehow aligned with my career.

About a week before the album was released, she sat down for an interview with The Breakfast Club, in which she claimed that a male artist featured on a song from the album tried to engage in sexual activity with her and make it hard for her to clear a sample. Fans assumed that this was Kodak Black, considering previous comments he had made related to the topic, but he later denied that it was him. Latto also denied that it was 21 Savage.

== Release and promotion ==
Latto announced the album and its release date alongside its cover art on March 14, 2022. A week later, she revealed the tracklist for her album.

=== Singles ===
The lead single of the album, titled "Big Energy", was released on September 24, 2021.

The second single of the album, titled "Soufside", was released on November 5.

The third single of the album, titled "Wheelie", featuring a guest appearances from an Atlanta-based rapper 21 Savage, was released on March 11, 2022.

"Sunshine", featuring guest appearances from fellow American rappers Lil Wayne and Childish Gambino, impacted US rhythmic contemporary radio as the album's fourth and final single on April 26.

== Music and lyrics ==
AllMusic wrote that Latto covers "the standard range of topics" such as "bedroom bragging" on "Wheelie" and "getting money and demolishing enemies" on "Trust No Bitch". It also noted that most of the songs are trap while Latto tries out different genres on some songs. "Sunshine" blends trap drums with gospel vocals. "Like a Thug" is R&B while "Real One" and "Big Energy" are pop.

== Critical reception ==
Professional ratings
Review scores
Source	Rating
AllMusic	3.5/5 stars
Clash	8/10
NME	4/5 stars
Pitchfork	6.5/10

Writing for Clash, Ana Lamond felt that "the tracklist weaves through Big Latto, the signature hard-hitting persona, whilst turning to the more sensual, R&B production that lends itself to a vulnerability" and "there's a sense that the riser is leaning into an increasingly diverse approach, welcoming a pop-centric commercial appeal", adding that "777 is daring and ambitious, paving the way for Latto's fortunes as she embraces the spheres outside of Atlanta rap" and "at the end of the day, she's got it tatted on her wrist...". Jordan Bassett of NME opined that "away from the Billboard-bothering singles, Alyssa Stephens [referring to Latto by her real name] dials down the braggadocio and dials up the introspection, though the overall mood is buoyant" and "it's a record that meets Stephens on the other side of criticism that has dogged her since she introduced her unintentionally offensive former moniker, Mulatto, as an eventual winner of reality show The Rap Game in 2016".

Pitchfork music critic Tyra Nicole Triche stated that "777 proves that Latto is a formidable force, though there's still work to do to realize her full potential" and "if she hasn't quite nailed down a winning sound, she's willing to take some big gambles". Tom Breihan of Stereogum wrote that 777 is "a sharp and canny piece of pop-rap". He noted that the album is "total major-label product" with all of the tracks sounding like "potential singles" because Latto is trying to make hits. He concluded that it is "pretty entertaining, in its low-stakes, low-commitment kind of way".

=== Mid-year lists ===
777 on mid-year lists
Publication	List	Rank	Ref.
Rolling Stone	Best Albums of 2022 So Far	30	
Consequence	The 12 Rap Albums of 2022 (So Far)	12	

=== Year-end lists ===
Publication	List	Rank	Ref.
HuffPost	12 Best Albums of 2022	—N/a	
Rolling Stone	100 Best Albums of 2022	76	
Rolling Stone	25 Best Hip-hop Albums of 2022	13	

== Track listing ==
777
No.	Title	Writer(s)	Length
1.	"777 Pt. 1"	Alyssa Stephens; Jocelyn Donald; Sonny Uwaezuoke	1:20
2.	"777 Pt. 2"	Stephens; Jaucquez Lowe; Diego Avendano; Joel Banks; Taylor Banks	2:03
3.	"Wheelie" (featuring 21 Savage)	Stephens; Sage Skolfield; Sean Solymar; Shéyaa Abraham-Joseph; Paul Beauregard; Kameron Cole; Joshua Goods; Jordan Houston; Markus Randle	2:50
4.	"Big Energy"	Stephens; Lowe; Adrian Belew; Christopher Frantz; Lukasz Gottwald; Randall Hammers; A1 LaFlare; Vaughn Oliver; Steven Stanley; Theron Thomas; Tina Weymouth	2:53
5.	"Sunshine" (featuring Lil Wayne and Childish Gambino)	Stephens; Skolfield; Solymar; Dwayne Carter, Jr.; Donald Glover; Anthony Clemons, Jr.; Philip Cornish; Luke Crowder; Uforo Ebong	3:26
6.	"Like a Thug" (featuring Lil Durk)	Stephens; Durk Banks; Eliot Dubock; Paris Jones; Tatiana Matthews; Cooper McGill; Sean Stein; Justin Zim	2:52
7.	"It's Givin"	Stephens; Donald; Isaac de Boni; Darryl Clemons; Michael Mule; Tahj Morgan	2:33
8.	"Stepper" (featuring Nardo Wick)	Stephens; Donald; D. Clemons; Horace Walls III; Ernest Adams; Abdallah Ahmad; Jeffrey Shannon	2:28
9.	"Trust No Bitch"	Stephens; David Doman; Finlay Thomas	2:34
10.	"Bussdown" (featuring Kodak Black)	Stephens; Lowe; Bill Kapri; Jason Cornet; Joshua Parker; Ivory Scott IV; Terrence Williams; Vanessa Carlton	2:46
11.	"Soufside"	Stephens; Lowe; Skolfield; Solymar; Radric Davis; LaDamon Douglas; June James	1:51
12.	"Sleep Sleep"	Stephens; Donald; Jahmal Gwin; Samuel Lindley; Erika Lockhart; Carl Mitchell; Quintin Saffold; Daen Simmons	2:51
13.	"Real One"	Stephens; Donald; Lowe; Pharrell Williams	2:27
Total length:			32:54

777 reissue
No.	Title	Writer(s)	Length
14.	"Big Energy" (remix; with Mariah Carey featuring DJ Khaled)	Stephens; Lowe; Belew; Frantz; Gottwald; Hammers; A1 LaFlare; Oliver; Stanley; T. Thomas; Weymouth; Carey	3:01
Total length:			35:55

=== Sample credits ===
- "Big Energy" contains a sample of "Genius of Love", as performed by Tom Tom Club. Its official remix additionally interpolates and contains a sample of Mariah Carey's "Fantasy".
- "Bussdown" interpolates "A Thousand Miles", written and performed by Vanessa Carlton.
- "Sleep Sleep" contains a sample of "Get It Wet", as performed by Twista, and was produced by the Legendary Traxster.

== Personnel ==
- Sonny Digital – production (1)
- Diego Ave – production (2)
- Bankroll Got It – production (2)
- Sage Skolfield – production (3, 11)
- Sean Solymar – production (3, 11)
- Hollywood Cole – production (3)
- Dr. Luke – production (4)
- Vaughn Oliver – production (4)
- BongoByTheWay – production (5)
- Luke Crowder – production (5)
- Dis – production (6)
- Beat Butcha – production (6)
- Coop the Truth – production (6)
- Pooh Beatz – production (7, 8)
- FnZ – production (7)
- JetsonMade – production (7)
- D.A. Got That Dope – production (9)
- OG Parker – production (10)
- Romano – production (10)
- TenRoc – production (10)
- June James – production (11)
- BoogzDaBeast – production (12)
- Pharrell Williams – production (13)

== Charts ==
=== Weekly charts ===
Chart performance for 777
Chart (2022)	Peak position
Canadian Albums (Billboard)	60
US Billboard 200	15
US Top R&B/Hip-Hop Albums (Billboard)	8

=== Year-end charts ===
Year-end chart performance for 777
Chart (2022)	Position
US Top R&B/Hip-Hop Albums (Billboard)	90

== Certifications ==
Certifications and sales for 777
Region	Certification	Certified units/sales
Canada (Music Canada)	Gold	40,000^{‡}
New Zealand (RMNZ)	Gold	7,500^{‡}
United States (RIAA)	Gold	500,000^{‡}
^{‡} Sales+streaming figures based on certification alone.
