= Muwop =

2020 single by Mulatto featuring Gucci Mane

Single by Mulatto featuring Gucci Mane

from the album Queen of da Souf
- Released: July 30, 2020
- Recorded: 2020
- Genre: Southern hip-hop; trap
- Length: 3:20
- Label: Streamcut; RCA
- Songwriters: Alyssa Stephens; Radric Davis; Anthony White; Bobby Session, Jr.; Ronny Wright; Keldrick Sapp
- Producer: J. White Did It

Mulatto singles chronology
"Kirk" (2020)	"Muwop" (2020)	"Make Em Say" (2020)

Gucci Mane singles chronology
"My Love" (2020)	"Muwop" (2020)	"No Luv" (2020)

Music video
- "Muwop" on YouTube

"Muwop" is a song by American rapper Latto (then known as Mulatto) featuring fellow American rapper Gucci Mane, released through Streamcut and RCA Records on July 30, 2020. Released as the second official single from Latto's debut album Queen of da Souf, the single was serviced to American rhythmic contemporary radio on August 25, 2020. The song was produced by J. White Did It and heavily samples the 2007 single "Freaky Gurl" by Gucci Mane, taking its instrumental and chorus. The song's title combines Latto's stage name at the time of its release and one of the nicknames used by Gucci Mane, "Guwop". "Muwop" peaked at number four on the Billboard Bubbling Under Hot 100 chart.

== Background and release ==
In March 2020, it was officially announced that Latto had signed with RCA Records. Following the announcement, Latto released the promotional singles "No Hook" and "He Say She Say" in April and May respectively. In July 2020, Latto recreated some of Gucci Mane's album covers, starting with The State vs. Radric Davis. Gucci reacted positively. Latto announced the single days later. Latto later appeared on Genius's YouTube show Verified, where she explained the lyrics to the song.

== Music video ==
A music video was released coinciding with the song's release in 1998. It was shot in Miami and directed by Arrad. The video starts with a kid telling her mother that Latto has arrived, and her mother says that Gucci Mane cannot afford a girlfriend. Latto raps in a mansion, seated in front of a group of women receiving pedicures from shirtless men, before they head out to the pool, where Gucci Mane is. He and Latto head to the front of the mansion, as he raps his verse. The video ends with a tribute to Breonna Taylor.

== Charts ==
Chart (2020)	Peak position
US Bubbling Under Hot 100 (Billboard)	4
US Hot R&B/Hip-Hop Songs (Billboard)	40
US Rhythmic Airplay (Billboard)	21

== Certifications ==
Region	Certification	Certified units/sales
United States (RIAA)	Platinum	1,000,000^{‡}
^{‡} Sales+streaming figures based on certification alone.

== Release history ==
Region	Date	Format(s)	Label(s)	Ref.
Various	July 30, 2020	Digital download; streaming	Streamcut; RCA	
United States	August 25, 2020	Rhythmic contemporary	RCA	
United States	August 25, 2020	Urban adult contemporary	RCA	
