= Bitch from da Souf =

2019 song by Latto

Single by Latto

from the album Queen of Da Souf
- Released: January 11, 2019
- Genre: Southern hip hop
- Length: 2:24
- Label: Streamcut; Pittstop Ent.
- Songwriters: Alyssa Stephens; Joel Banks; Taylor Banks
- Producer: Bankroll Got It

Latto singles chronology
"Bitch from da Souf" (2019)	"Pretty Girl" (remix) (2019)

Music video
- "Bitch from da Souf" on YouTube
- "Bitch from da Souf" (remix) on YouTube

"Bitch from da Souf" is the debut single by American rapper Latto (then known as "Mulatto"), released in January 2019. Produced by Bankroll Got It, it is the lead single from her second EP Big Latto (2019). The song is considered Latto's breakout hit; its success led to her signing to RCA Records. On December 4, 2019, a remix of the song was released, featuring fellow female rappers Saweetie and Trina, as the lead single from Latto's debut studio album Queen of Da Souf (2020).

== Composition ==
The Fader has described the song has an "anthem for women from below the Mason-Dixon line." With sex references, Latto calls herself a "real ass, rich ass bitch from the Souf".

== Music video ==
The music video of the song was released on January 11, 2019, and the music video for the remix was released on March 24, 2020.

== Charts ==
Chart (2019–2020)	Peak position
US Billboard Hot 100	95
US Hot R&B/Hip-Hop Songs (Billboard)	37
US R&B/Hip-Hop Airplay (Billboard)	13

== Certifications ==
Region	Certification	Certified units/sales
Canada (Music Canada)	Gold	40,000^{‡}
United States (RIAA)	2× Platinum	2,000,000^{‡}
^{‡} Sales+streaming figures based on certification alone.
