= Queen of da Souf =

Studio album by Mulatto
- Released: August 21, 2020
- Recorded: 2019–2020
- Genre: Hip hop
- Length: 31:24
- Labels: RCA; Streamcut
- Producers: Bankhead; Bankroll Got It; Bijan Amir; BricksDaMane; Diego Ave; Ghost-Kid Da Produca; Hitmaka; IAmXayy; Jae Roc; Johnny Dutra; J. White Did It; Murda Beatz; Pooh Beatz; BOADRAY; Rice n' Peas; Robot Scott; RTJ; SkipOnDaBeat; Tha Genius; ThaOnlySensei; London Jae

Mulatto chronology
Hit the Latto (2019)	Queen of da Souf (2020)	777 (2022)

Singles from Queen of da Souf
- 1. "Bitch from da Souf (Remix)" Released: December 4, 2019; 2. "Muwop" Released: July 30, 2020; 3. "On God" Released: September 10, 2020; 4. "In n Out" Released: October 15, 2020; 5. "Sex Lies" Released: November 27, 2020

Queen of da Souf is the debut studio album by American rapper Latto, released under the previous stage name Mulatto. It was released on August 21, 2020, by RCA Records and Streamcut. The album was supported by four singles: "Bitch from da Souf (Remix)" (featuring Saweetie and Trina), "Muwop" (featuring Gucci Mane), "On God", and "In n Out" (featuring City Girls); alongside two promotional singles: "No Hook" and "He Say She Say". The album features guest appearances from other artists such as 21 Savage and 42 Dugg. The album debuted at number 44 on the Billboard 200. The album's extended version was released on December 11, 2020. The album was later certified gold by the Recording Industry Association of America (RIAA).

== Background ==
In 2019, Latto rose to prominence with her single, "Bitch from da Souf". Not only did the song later receive a remix with feature guest appearances from fellow American rappers Saweetie and Trina, but the remix would be featured on her extended play (EP), titled Hit the Latto (2019). The success of the remix led her to sign a record deal with RCA Records in early 2020. Following her signing a record deal after its release of the remix, the single peaked at number 95 on the US Billboard Hot 100, becoming a certified gold by the Recording Industry Association of America (RIAA). Within a day prior to the album's announcement, it was revealed that Latto would be included on XXL's Freshman Class of 2020.

On August 12, 2020, Latto went on her social media accounts to announce the release of her debut studio album, titled Queen of da Souf, while revealing the album cover artwork, alongside the release date. Three days later, Latto revealed the track listing for the album, but replaced all unknown guest appearances with emojis, opting for her fans to guess the features. Latto revealed the features on August 19, which includes the rap duo City Girls and Georgian-native rapper 21 Savage.

== Singles ==
The album's lead single, "Bitch from da Souf" was released in January 2019 and became Latto's breakout hit. The remix version, featuring Saweetie and Trina, was released on December 4, 2019.

"Muwop", featuring Gucci Mane, was released on July 30, 2020, as the album's official second single after Latto recreated Mane's album covers on her social media. The song samples Mane's 2007 single "Freaky Gurl" and was released alongside its music video. The single was serviced to US Rhythmic radio on August 25, 2020.

The album's third single, "On God", had a music video released on Lyrical Lemonade's YouTube account on September 10, 2020.

"In n Out", featuring American rap duo City Girls, was released as the album's fourth single and received a music video which was released on October 15, 2020.

"Sex Lies", featuring Lil Baby, was released as the first single from the extended version of the album and the fifth overall. A music video was premiered on December 11, 2020.

=== Promotional singles ===
Her first song, titled "No Hook", was first released as the album's first single, but instead was its promotional single on April 23, 2020. The song was Latto's first official release since announcing that she had signed to RCA Records and was released alongside its music video. "No Hook" tells Latto's come up story to stardom in a single verse, hence the title. The second song, titled "He Say She Say", was released alongside a "quarantine style" music video as the album's second promotional single in May 2020.

=== Other songs ===
The music video for the opening track, "Youngest and Richest", was premiered on the release date of the album. A music video for the extended version album track, "Spend It", was released on December 22, 2020. The video portrays Latto going to a local Walmart and purchasing essential items for the community.

== Music and lyrics ==
According to the BrooklynVegan, "Queen of da Souf is full of sex-positive anthems that are overflowing with charisma and confidence". On "Muwop", Latto "twists Gucci Mane’s 2006 hit, “Freaky Gurl” with a feminine flare." On "No Hook", she "bravely talks about her pregnancy scares, her terrible relationships, and her rough come-up". On "Bitch from da Souf Remix", the rappers "trade off and spit bars representative of their respective hometowns–Atlanta, Miami and the Bay Area."

== Critical reception ==
Professional ratings
Review scores
Source	Rating
AllMusic	3.5/5 stars
Ratings Game Music	C

Fred Thomas of AllMusic rated the album 3.5 out of 5 stars. He commented that it "taps into the same irrepressible swagger and irreverent charm of Latto's runaway hits "No Hook," and "B*tch from Da Souf" and pads out the material with plentiful features from established artists." Quincy of Ratings Game Music gave the album a C rating. He wrote that "Mulatto has a bright future and the aura of someone that can end up being one of the greats."

Michael Penn of VMP wrote that Latto shows her versatility by adjusting to featuring artists' styles and choosing beats that suit her attitude. Alphonse Pierre of Pitchfork criticized the album, which "is held back by production that seems like it was chosen by someone who hasn't listened to Atlanta rap in at least half a decade."

=== Year-end lists ===
Publication	List	Rank	Ref.
Genius	50 Best Albums of 2020	46	
The Source	20 Best Hip-hop Albums of 2020	—N/a	

== Track listing ==
Standard edition
No.	Title	Writer(s)	Length
1.	"Youngest and Richest"	Alyssa Stephens; Joel Banks; Taylor Banks	1:45
2.	"Muwop" (featuring Gucci Mane)	Stephens; Radric Davis; Keldrick Sapp; Bobby Session, Jr.; Anthony White; Ronny Wright	3:20
3.	"In n Out" (featuring City Girls)	Stephens; Caresha Brownlee; Jatavia Johnson; Jocelyn Donald; Johnny Dutra; Derrick Grey; Shane Lindstrom	3:15
4.	"He Say She Say"	Stephens; Mark Bankhead, Jr.; Randy Turner, Jr.; Bijan Amirkhani	2:25
5.	"Pull Up" (featuring 21 Savage)	Stephens; Shéyaa Abraham-Joseph; J. Banks; T. Banks; Diego Avendano; Jaucquez Lowe; Christian "Hitmaka" Ward; Fletcher Redd; Germán Valdés	2:36
6.	"Toya Turnup Talks (Skit)"	Stephens; J. Banks; T. Banks; Avendano; Craig Love; Deonjelo Holmes; Jonathan Smith; Eric Jackson, Jr.	0:36
7.	"On God"	Stephens; J. Banks; T. Banks; Avendano; Love; Holmes; Smith; Jackson; Donald; Charles Hugo; Pharrell Williams; Joshua Woods	1:53
8.	"Look Back at It"	Stephens; Darryl Clemons; Charles Driggers; Jordan Holt-May; Julian Taylor	2:47
9.	"No Hook"	Stephens; Bankhead; Turner; Tracy Maxwell, Jr.	1:43
10.	"Off Top" (featuring 42 Dugg)	Stephens; Dion Hayes; Lowe; Ward; Edgar Ferrera	2:16
11.	"My Body"	Stephens; Paul Dawson; Scott Fitzgerald; Alvin Isaacs II; Keith Sweat; Gerald Thomas; Alicia Williams	2:58
12.	"Blame Me"	Stephens; Driggers; Scott Carter; Kevin Price; Kevin White; Michael Woods II	2:06
13.	"Bitch from da Souf" (Remix) (featuring Saweetie and Trina)	Stephens; Diamonté Harper; Katrina Taylor; J. Banks; T. Banks; Matthew Banks	3:44
Total length:			31:24

Extended version
No.	Title	Writer(s)	Length
14.	"Queen"	Stephens; Dutra; Ahmar Bailey	2:16
15.	"Sex Lies" (featuring Lil Baby)	Stephens; Dominique Jones; Clemons; Steven Alexander; Nija Charles; Tahj Morgan	2:42
16.	"Step It Up"	Stephens; K-So Jaynes; Javar Rockamore; Roman Rondiak	2:41
17.	"Stank"	Stephens; Lowe; Clemons; J. Taylor; Carlos Goodwin	2:30
18.	"Spend It"	Stephens; J. Banks; T. Banks; Avendano; Holt-May	2:32

== Personnel ==
- Bankroll Got It – production (1, 5–7, 13, 18)
- Boadray – production (2, 6, 9, 13)
- Diego Ave – production (5–7, 18)
- Mark Bankhead, Jr. – production (4, 9)
- RTJ – production (4, 9)
- Hitmaka – production (5, 10)
- BricksDaMane – production (8, 12)
- Pooh Beatz – production (8, 15, 17)
- Johnny Dutra – production (3, 14)
- IAmXayy – production (8, 17)
- J. White Did It – production (2)
- Murda Beatz – production (3)
- Bijan Amir – production (4)
- Jae Roc – production (5)
- ThaOnlySensei – production (9)
- SkipOnDaBeat – production (10)
- Tha Genius – production (11)
- Ghost-Kid Da Produca – production (11)
- Go Grizzly – production (12)
- Rice N’ Peas – production (12)
- Robot Scott – production (12)
- Kid Hazel – production (14)
- JetsonMade – production (15)
- DJ Shawdi P – production (15)
- The Loopholes – production (16)
- London Jae – production (17)
- Los the Producer – production (17)

== Charts ==
Chart performance for Queen of da Souf
Chart (2020)	Peak position
US Billboard 200	44
US Top R&B/Hip-Hop Albums (Billboard)	25

== Certifications ==
Certifications for Queen of da Souf
Region	Certification	Certified units/sales
United States (RIAA)	Gold	500,000^{‡}
^{‡} Sales+streaming figures based on certification alone.
