= 2022 MTV Video Music Awards =

2022 edition of the MTV Video Music Awards

- Date: Sunday, August 28, 2022; 8:00–11:19 p.m. EDT
- Venue: Prudential Center, Newark, New Jersey
- Country: United States
- Hosted by: LL Cool J Nicki Minaj; Jack Harlow (Note: Officially referred to as emcees by MTV, the trio performed typical hosting duties such as introducing presenters and performers.)

Highlights
- Most awards: Jack Harlow (4)
- Most nominations: Doja Cat; Jack Harlow; Harry Styles (8 each)
- Website: mtv.com/vma

Television/radio coverage
- Network: MTV; The CW; MTV2; VH1; BET; BET Her; Nick at Nite; CMT; Comedy Central; Paramount Network; TV Land; Pop TV; Logo TV; Channel 5 (UK); MTV mobile app and MTV.com
- Produced by: Bruce Gillmer; Jesse Ignjatovic
- Directed by: Liz Clare

The 2022 MTV Video Music Awards were held at the Prudential Center in Newark, New Jersey on August 28, 2022. The show was hosted by LL Cool J, Nicki Minaj, and Jack Harlow. Nicki Minaj received the Video Vanguard Award, presented to her by her fans. Red Hot Chili Peppers received the Global Icon Award which was presented to them by Cheech & Chong.

== Performances ==
List of musical performances
Artist(s)	Song(s)
Pre-show
Saucy Santana	"Booty" "I'm Too Much"
Yung Gravy	"Betty (Get Money)"
Dove Cameron	"Boyfriend" "Breakfast"
Main show
Jack Harlow; Fergie	"First Class" "Glamorous"
Lizzo	"About Damn Time" "2 Be Loved (Am I Ready)"
Blackpink	"Pink Venom"
J Balvin; Ryan Castro	"Nivel de Perreo"
Khalid; Marshmello	"Numb"
Nicki Minaj	Michael Jackson Video Vanguard Medley "All Things Go" "Roman's Revenge" "Monster" "Beez in the Trap" "Chun-Li" "Moment 4 Life" "Super Bass" "Anaconda" "Super Freaky Girl"
Eminem; Snoop Dogg	"From the D 2 the LBC"
Red Hot Chili Peppers	Global Icon Medley "Black Summer" "Can't Stop"
Anitta	"Envolver" "Movimento da Sanfoninha" "Bola Rebola" "Vai Malandra" "Lobby"
Kane Brown	"Grand" (Note: From the Toyota Stage in Fort Lee)
Måneskin	"Supermodel"
Bad Bunny	"Tití Me Preguntó" (Note: From Yankee Stadium)
Panic! at the Disco	"Don't Let the Light Go Out"
Extended Play Stage (Presented by Doritos)
Conan Gray	"Disaster" "Memories"
Flo Milli	"Conceited" "Bedtime"
JID	"Dance Now" "Surround Sound"
Lauren Spencer-Smith	"Fingers Crossed" "Flowers"

== Presenters ==
Presenters were announced on August 26. Nessa Diab and Kevan Kenney hosted the 90-minute pre-show event, while Tate McRae served as special celebrity correspondent. Murda Beatz acted as the pre-show House DJ.

=== Pre-show ===
- Kevan Kenney – presented Best Alternative and Best Metaverse Performance
- Tate McRae – presented Push Performance of the Year

=== Main show ===
- Johnny Depp – intermittently appeared throughout the ceremony in pre-recorded segments as the Moon Person
- Offset and DJ Khaled – presented Best Collaboration
- Avril Lavigne – announced the finalists for Best New Artist and presented the award later in the night
- Latto – introduced Blackpink
- Lili Reinhart – presented Best Longform Video
- Offset – introduced Conan Gray and the Extended Play Stage
- Chlöe – introduced Marshmello and Khalid
- Jimmy Fallon – presented Album of the Year
- Members of Nicki Minaj's fanbase, the Barbz – presented the Video Vanguard Award to Minaj
- Sofia Carson – presented Best K-Pop
- Cheech & Chong – introduced the Red Hot Chili Peppers and presented the Global Icon Award to them
- Bebe Rexha – presented Video for Good
- Blackpink – introduced Anitta
- Jack Harlow (emcee) and Druski – introduced Kane Brown
- Ashley Graham – presented Best Latin
- Dixie D'Amelio – introduced Måneskin
- Becky G – presented Best Hip Hop
- Dove Cameron – presented Song of Summer
- Nicki Minaj (emcee) – presented Artist of the Year
- Carmelo Anthony – presented the Artist of the Year award to Bad Bunny at Yankee Stadium
- Joel Madden – presented Best Rock
- Billy Eichner – introduced Panic! at the Disco
- LL Cool J and Nicki Minaj (emcees) – presented Video of the Year

== Winners and nominees ==
Nominations were announced on July 26, 2022. Jack Harlow, Kendrick Lamar and Lil Nas X had the most nominations with seven each, followed by Doja Cat and Harry Styles having six nominations each. Nominees for Song of Summer, Group of the Year, and Album of the Year were announced on August 19. Voting for Group of the Year and Song of Summer ran from August 22–25 and August 25–27 respectively, while voting for Album of the Year ran from August 27 until the show, via MTV's Instagram stories. After the second round of categories was announced, the nominations for Doja Cat, Harlow and Styles increased to eight each, making them the artists with the most nominations. Harlow was the most awarded nominee with four wins, followed by Lil Nas X, Styles and Taylor Swift having three each.

Winners are listed first and highlighted in bold.

List of winners and nominees for the 2022 MTV Video Music Awards
Video of the Year (presented by Burger King)	Song of the Year
**Taylor Swift – All Too Well: The Short Film**; Doja Cat – "Woman"; Drake (featuring Future and Young Thug) – "Way 2 Sexy"; Ed Sheeran – "Shivers"; Harry Styles – "As It Was"; Lil Nas X and Jack Harlow – "Industry Baby"; Olivia Rodrigo – "Brutal"	**Billie Eilish – "Happier Than Ever"**; Adele – "Easy on Me"; Doja Cat – "Woman"; Elton John and Dua Lipa – "Cold Heart (Pnau remix)"; Lizzo – "About Damn Time"; The Kid Laroi and Justin Bieber – "Stay"
Artist of the Year	Best New Artist (presented by EXTRA Gum)
**Bad Bunny**; Drake; Ed Sheeran; Harry Styles; Jack Harlow; Lil Nas X; Lizzo	**Dove Cameron**; Baby Keem; Gayle; Latto; Måneskin; Seventeen
Push Performance of The Year	Best Collaboration
**Seventeen – "Rock With You"**; Griff – "One Night"; Remi Wolf – "Sexy Villain"; Nessa Barrett – "I Hope Ur Miserable Until Ur Dead"; Mae Muller – "Better Days"; Gayle – "ABCDEFU"; Shenseea – "R U That"; Omar Apollo – "Tamagotchi"; Wet Leg – "Chaise Longue"; Muni Long – "Baby Boo"; Doechii – "Persuasive"	**Lil Nas X and Jack Harlow – "Industry Baby"**; Drake (featuring Future and Young Thug) – "Way 2 Sexy"; Elton John and Dua Lipa – "Cold Heart (Pnau remix)"; Megan Thee Stallion and Dua Lipa – "Sweetest Pie"; Post Malone and The Weeknd – "One Right Now"; Rosalía (featuring The Weeknd) – "La Fama"; The Kid Laroi and Justin Bieber – "Stay"
Best Pop	Best Hip-Hop
**Harry Styles – "As It Was"**; Billie Eilish – "Happier Than Ever"; Doja Cat – "Woman"; Ed Sheeran – "Shivers"; Lizzo – "About Damn Time"; Olivia Rodrigo – "Traitor"	**Nicki Minaj (featuring Lil Baby) – "Do We Have a Problem?"**; Eminem and Snoop Dogg – "From the D 2 the LBC"; Future (featuring Drake and Tems) – "Wait for U"; Kendrick Lamar – "N95"; Latto – "Big Energy"; Pusha T – "Diet Coke"
Best R&B	Best K-Pop
**The Weeknd – "Out of Time"**; Alicia Keys – "City of Gods (Part II)"; Chlöe – "Have Mercy"; H.E.R. – "For Anyone"; Normani (featuring Cardi B) – "Wild Side"; Summer Walker, SZA and Cardi B – "No Love" (Extended Version)	**Lisa – "Lalisa"**; BTS – "Yet to Come (The Most Beautiful Moment)"; Itzy – "Loco"; Seventeen – "Hot"; Stray Kids – "Maniac"; Twice – "The Feels"
Best Latin	Best Rock
**Anitta – "Envolver"**; Bad Bunny – "Tití Me Preguntó"; Becky G and Karol G – "Mamiii"; Daddy Yankee – "Remix"; Farruko – "Pepas"; J Balvin and Skrillex – "In da Getto"	**Red Hot Chili Peppers – "Black Summer"**; Foo Fighters – "Love Dies Young"; Jack White – "Taking Me Back"; Muse – "Won't Stand Down"; Shinedown – "Planet Zero"; Three Days Grace – "So Called Life"
Best Alternative	Video for Good
**Måneskin – "I Wanna Be Your Slave"**; Avril Lavigne (featuring Blackbear) – "Love It When You Hate Me"; Imagine Dragons and JID – "Enemy"; Machine Gun Kelly (featuring Willow) – "Emo Girl"; Panic! at the Disco – "Viva Las Vengeance"; Twenty One Pilots – "Saturday"; Willow and Avril Lavigne (featuring Travis Barker) – "Grow"	**Lizzo – "About Damn Time"**; Kendrick Lamar – "The Heart Part 5"; Latto – "Pussy"; Rina Sawayama – "This Hell"; Stromae – "Fils de joie"
Group of the Year	Song of Summer
**BTS**; Blackpink (Note: Several news outlets, including Entertainment Tonight and Teen Vogue, reported that Blackpink won Group of the Year several hours before the award was announced. The tweets and articles were deleted or changed, without acknowledgment of the false reporting, once MTV officially announced that BTS won.); City Girls; Foo Fighters; Imagine Dragons; Måneskin; Red Hot Chili Peppers; Silk Sonic	**Jack Harlow – "First Class"**; Bad Bunny and Chencho Corleone – "Me Porto Bonito"; Beyoncé – "Break My Soul"; Charlie Puth (featuring Jungkook) – "Left and Right"; Doja Cat – "Vegas"; Future (featuring Drake and Tems) – "Wait for U"; Harry Styles – "Late Night Talking"; Kane Brown – "Grand"; Latto and Mariah Carey (featuring DJ Khaled) – "Big Energy (Remix)"; Lizzo – "About Damn Time"; Marshmello and Khalid – "Numb"; Nicki Minaj – "Super Freaky Girl"; Nicky Youre and dazy – "Sunroof"; Post Malone (featuring Doja Cat) – "I Like You (A Happier Song)"; Rosalía – "Bizcochito"; Steve Lacy – "Bad Habit"
Album of the Year	Best Metaverse Performance
**Harry Styles – Harry's House**; Adele – 30; Bad Bunny – Un Verano Sin Ti; Billie Eilish – Happier Than Ever; Drake – Certified Lover Boy	**Blackpink: The Virtual (PUBG)**; BTS (Minecraft); Charli XCX (Roblox); Justin Bieber – An Interactive Virtual Experience (Wave); Rift Tour (featuring Ariana Grande) (Fortnite); Twenty One Pilots Concert Experience (Roblox)
Best Longform Video	Best Direction
**Taylor Swift – All Too Well: The Short Film**; Billie Eilish – Happier Than Ever: A Love Letter to Los Angeles; Foo Fighters – Studio 666; Kacey Musgraves – Star-Crossed; Madonna – Madame X; Olivia Rodrigo – Driving Home 2 U	**Taylor Swift – All Too Well: The Short Film (Director: Taylor Swift)**; Baby Keem and Kendrick Lamar – "Family Ties" (Director: Dave Free); Billie Eilish – "Happier Than Ever" (Director: Billie Eilish); Ed Sheeran – "Shivers" (Director: Dave Meyers); Harry Styles – "As It Was" (Director: Tanu Muino); Lil Nas X and Jack Harlow – "Industry Baby" (Director: Christian Breslauer)
Best Art Direction	Best Choreography
**Lil Nas X and Jack Harlow – "Industry Baby" (Art Director: Alex Delgado)**; Adele – "Oh My God" (Art Directors: NuCalifornia); Doja Cat – "Get Into It (Yuh)" (Art Director: Matt Sokoler); Drake (featuring Future and Young Thug) – "Way 2 Sexy" (Art Director: Keith Raywood); Kacey Musgraves – "Simple Times" (Art Directors: K. K. Barrett and Alan Petherick); Megan Thee Stallion and Dua Lipa – "Sweetest Pie" (Art Director: Tyler Evans)	**Doja Cat – "Woman" (Choreographer: "Fullout Cortland" (Cortland Brown))**; BTS – "Permission to Dance" (Choreographers: Big Hit Music Performance Directing Team); FKA Twigs (featuring The Weeknd) – "Tears in the Club" (Choreographers: Sean Bankhead and Zoï Tatopoulos); Harry Styles – "As It Was" (Choreographer: Yoann Bourgeois); Lil Nas X and Jack Harlow – "Industry Baby" (Choreographer: Sean Bankhead); Normani (featuring Cardi B) – "Wild Side" (Choreographer: Sean Bankhead)
Best Cinematography	Best Editing
**Harry Styles – "As It Was" (Director of Photography: Nikita Kuzmenko)**; Baby Keem and Kendrick Lamar – "Family Ties" (Director of Photography: Bruce Cole); Camila Cabello (featuring Ed Sheeran) – "Bam Bam" (Director of Photography: David Bolen); Kendrick Lamar – "N95" (Director of Photography: Adam Newport-Berra); Normani (featuring Cardi B) – "Wild Side" (Director of Photography: Nikita Kuzmenko); Taylor Swift – All Too Well: The Short Film (Director of Photography: Rina Yang)	**Rosalía – "Saoko" (Editors: Valentin Petit and Jon Echeveste)**; Baby Keem and Kendrick Lamar – "Family Ties" (Editor: Neal Farmer); Doja Cat – "Get Into It (Yuh)" (Editor: Mike Diva); Olivia Rodrigo – "Brutal" (Editor: Alyssa Oh from Rock Paper Scissors); Taylor Swift – All Too Well: The Short Film (Editor: Ted Guard); The Weeknd – "Take My Breath" (Editor: Nick Rondeau)
Best Visual Effects
**Lil Nas X and Jack Harlow – "Industry Baby" (Visual Effects: Cameo FX)**; Billie Eilish – "Happier Than Ever" (Visual Effects: Ingenuity Studios); Coldplay and BTS – "My Universe" (Visual Effects: AMGI, BUF, Ingenuity, Rodeo FX and Territory Studio); Kendrick Lamar – "The Heart Part 5" (Visual Effects: Deep Voodoo); Megan Thee Stallion and Dua Lipa – "Sweetest Pie" (Visual Effects: Mário Dubec at UPP); The Kid Laroi and Justin Bieber – "Stay" (Visual Effects: Digital Axis)
Michael Jackson Video Vanguard Award (Note: While Michael Jackson's name was included in press releases announcing that Nicki Minaj would receive the award, it was not mentioned during the ceremony broadcast.)
**Nicki Minaj**
Global Icon Award
**Red Hot Chili Peppers**

== Artists with multiple wins and nominations ==
Artists who received multiple awards
Wins	Artist
4	Jack Harlow
3	Harry Styles
3	Lil Nas X
3	Taylor Swift
2	Nicki Minaj
2	Red Hot Chili Peppers

Artists who received multiple nominations
Nominations	Artist
8	Doja Cat
8	Harry Styles
8	Jack Harlow
7	Drake
7	Kendrick Lamar
7	Lil Nas X
6	Billie Eilish
5	BTS
5	Dua Lipa
5	Ed Sheeran
5	Future
5	Lizzo
5	Taylor Swift
5	The Weeknd
4	Baby Keem
4	Bad Bunny
4	Cardi B
4	Justin Bieber
4	Latto
4	Olivia Rodrigo
3	Adele
3	Foo Fighters
3	Måneskin
3	Megan Thee Stallion
3	Normani
3	Rosalía
3	Seventeen
3	The Kid Laroi
3	Young Thug
2	Avril Lavigne
2	Blackpink
2	Elton John
2	Gayle
2	Imagine Dragons
2	Kacey Musgraves
2	Nicki Minaj
2	Post Malone
2	Red Hot Chili Peppers
2	Tems
2	Twenty One Pilots
2	Willow

== Music Videos with multiple wins and nominations ==
Music Videos that received multiple awards
Wins	Artist(s)	Music Video
3	Lil Nas X & Jack Harlow	"Industry Baby"
3	Taylor Swift	All Too Well: The Short Film
2	Harry Styles	"As It Was"

Music Videos that received multiple nominations
Nominations	Artist(s)	Music Video
6	Lil Nas X & Jack Harlow	"Industry Baby"
5	Harry Styles	"As It Was"
5	Taylor Swift	All Too Well: The Short Film
4	Billie Eilish	"Happier Than Ever"
4	Doja Cat	"Woman"
4	Lizzo	"About Damn Time"
3	Baby Keem & Kendrick Lamar	"Family Ties"
3	Drake (featuring Future and Young Thug)	"Way 2 Sexy"
3	Ed Sheeran	"Shivers"
3	Megan Thee Stallion & Dua Lipa	"Sweetest Pie"
3	Normani (featuring Cardi B)	"Wild Side"
3	The Kid Laroi & Justin Bieber	"Stay"
2	Doja Cat	"Get Into It (Yuh)"
2	Elton John & Dua Lipa	"Cold Heart (Pnau remix)"
2	Future (featuring Drake and Tems)	"Wait for U"
2	Kendrick Lamar	"The Heart Part 5"
2	Kendrick Lamar	"N95"
2	Olivia Rodrigo	"Brutal"
