= Planet Her =

- Standard edition cover (Note: The cover artwork of the deluxe edition features the term "deluxe" on the image's upper edge.)

Studio album by Doja Cat
- Released: June 25, 2021
- Recorded: April 2020 – May 2021
- Studios: The Sound Factory (Los Angeles); Westlake (Los Angeles); Doja Cat and Y2K's home studio (Los Angeles)
- Genres: Pop; hip-hop; R&B
- Length: 44:06
- Labels: Kemosabe; RCA
- Producers: Doja Cat; Yeti Beats; Al Shux; Aaron Bow; Rogét Chahayed; Digi; Mayer Hawthorne; Mike Hector; Linden Jay; Dr. Luke; Kurtis McKenzie; Sully; Tizhimself; Y2K

Doja Cat chronology
Hot Pink (2019)	Planet Her (2021)	Scarlet (2023)

Singles from Planet Her
- 1. "Kiss Me More" Released: April 9, 2021; 2. "You Right" Released: June 25, 2021; 3. "Need to Know" Released: August 31, 2021; 4. "Woman" Released: October 1, 2021; 5. "Get Into It (Yuh)" Released: March 11, 2022

Planet Her is the third studio album by American rapper and singer Doja Cat. It was released on June 25, 2021, by Kemosabe Records and RCA Records. Titled after a fictional planet created by Doja Cat, it is an album stylistically influenced by pop, hip-hop, and R&B. Lyrically, the album touches on femininity, solitude, romance, and sexuality, among other topics.

The album features guest appearances from Young Thug, Ariana Grande, The Weeknd, JID, and SZA, with Eve and Gunna featuring on the deluxe edition. Doja Cat served as Planet Her's executive producer alongside frequent collaborator Yeti Beats. Both worked with producers Al Shux, Dr. Luke, Aaron Bow, Rogét Chahayed, Mayer Hawthorne, Kurtis McKenzie, and Y2K, among others.

Five singles were released in support of Planet Her: "Kiss Me More", "You Right", "Need to Know", "Woman", and "Get into It (Yuh)", all of which charted within the top 20 of the US Billboard Hot 100. It reached number one in New Zealand and spent four non-consecutive weeks at its peak of number two on the US Billboard 200 chart. Landing inside the top ten of thirteen countries, it finished 2021 as the world's tenth best-selling album that year. Planet Her was positively received by most music critics, who praised the sonic versatility and vocal deliveries. The deluxe of the album was nominated for Album of the Year and Best Pop Vocal Album at the 64th Annual Grammy Awards.

== Background and recording ==
Doja Cat released her second studio album Hot Pink in November 2019, and spent most of 2020 promoting its singles. In August 2020, she told MTV that her then-untitled third studio album would incorporate multiple music genres and that each song had its own "personality". Later in September 2020, Doja Cat revealed that her third studio album was complete and "all ready" for release. She also told iHeartRadio in December that it has a number of features and collaborations, and that each song has a "different kind of vibe" to one another.

I think in the beginning, I was just trying to be solid and be what a pop artist already was: what I'd seen on TV and what I thought was the right thing to do. But as I move on into this Planet Her era, I want to introduce things to people as opposed to just re-create and rehash. It's just more inspiring to start from a more innovative spot.

— Doja Cat in an interview, Billboard.

Half of the album was written in Hawaii in February 2019, where Doja Cat was on vacation with her manager and co-writer Lydia Asrat, recovering from a recent breakup. Recording for the album mostly took place under the lockdown constraints of the COVID-19 pandemic, largely between Doja Cat and American record producer Y2K's home studio, and the Sound Factory and Westlake Recording Studios in Los Angeles, California with American recording engineer Rian Lewis. Lewis claims that Doja Cat produced all her own vocals from inside the booth "with impeccable precision and intention," and that "every harmony, every massive stack, every backing vocal in a character voice... those are all her ideas, 100%." Doja Cat previewed the album tracks "Payday", "Ain't Shit" and "Love to Dream" while on Instagram livestreams in April 2020, May 2020 and May 2021 respectively. She recorded the final vocals for the opening track, "Woman", a month before the album was released.

In April 2021, shortly after confirming its title, Doja Cat said that Planet Her is her first album that "feels fully her own" and that as opposed to trying "to be a certain kind of pop star, she's simply embodying one". She said that like her previous record Hot Pink (2019), each song would be distinctly different from one another, yet there would be more cohesion on Planet Her as opposed to Hot Pink. Before its release, Doja Cat expressed her excitement about releasing R&B music and "exploring different lanes", ultimately describing the album as "unbelievable".

However, in 2023 Doja Cat ended up describing the album, along with the previous outing Hot Pink, as "mediocre pop" and "a cash grab".

== Concept and title ==
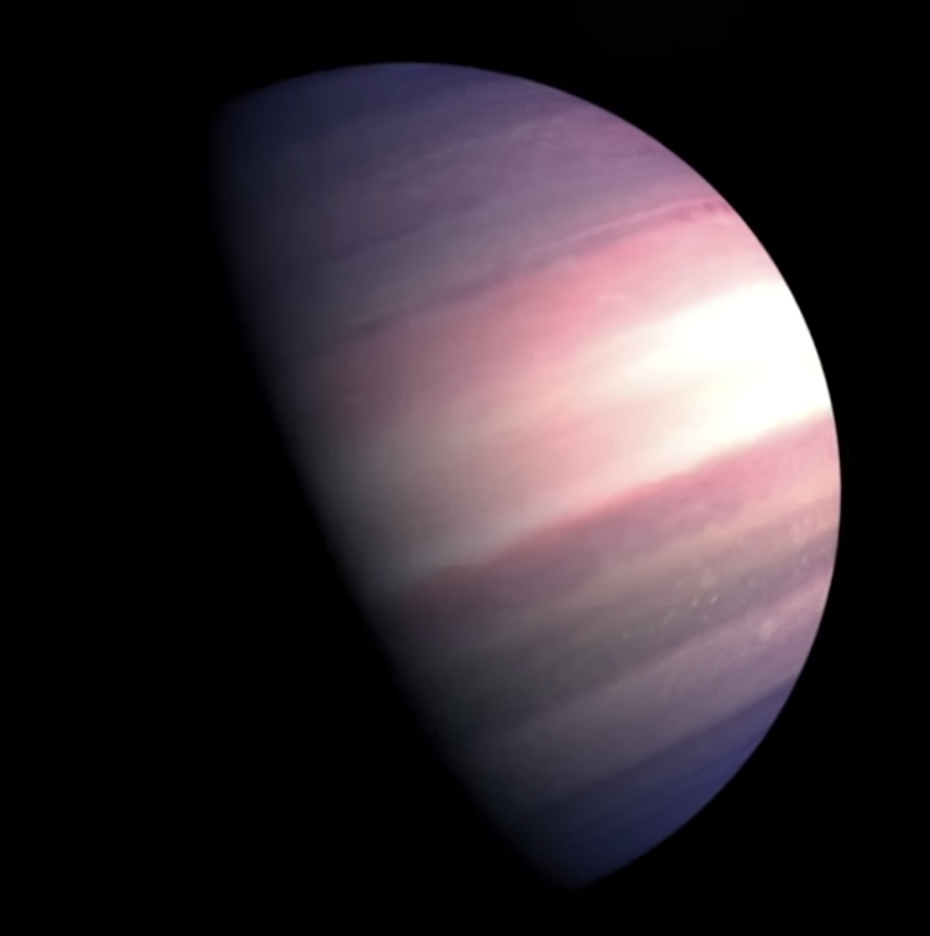
Doja Cat was inspired by the "lush looks" of TOI 1338b while envisioning the visual Planet Her concept.

Doja Cat has explained that Planet Her is "the center of the universe" where "all races of space exist and its where all species can kind of be in harmony there". She noted that by naming the album Planet Her, she was "just trying to be cute" and clarified that it is not a planet for women nor a "feminist thing". The music videos for the singles from the album all occur on different locations on the planet, and aim to explore the respective aspects of these locations and what they mean. In an interview with iHeartRadio, she described the album as the most visually captivating project she has ever done, and noted that, because the album focuses on relationships, "it's not a huge statement, not a political statement. It's just Planet Her, for girls".

I wanted to kind of go outside of what I understood [or] what I knew as pop aesthetic or rap aesthetic [et cetera]. I wanted to quite literally travel outside of the planet. When it comes to the videos and choice of words and melodies and combinations musically, I wanted it to feel different. I wanted it to feel otherworldly. So, I just named it Planet Her.

— Doja Cat on the inspiration behind the album title in an interview with MTV News.

Creative director Brett Alan Nelson revealed that he initially felt worried when Doja Cat told him that she wanted the record to "feel space age", however he explained further: "We're doing a style of futurism that feels fresh. We don't know what our actual future holds, so we are making what Doja Cat's future is."

=== Cover artwork ===
The album cover was shot by American commercial photographer David LaChapelle. It finds Doja Cat "floating in a sea of outer space". Her body is covered with sparkles. There were a number of different photographs taken amongst different sets, yet Doja Cat chose the final shot as it was her initial idea and felt set on it from the start. Although it appears as if she is flying in the image, Doja Cat claims that she is submerged in rock after having fell from space, but said that it is "left for your interpretation".

=== Reception ===
Insider interpreted through the album's music and lyrics that "Planet Her" is a place where "midday skies are streaked with pink and orange" and where "following your sexual urges is uncomplicated and morally good, where the feminine is divine and it's summer year-round." Rolling Stone described the planet as an "exquisitely strange and spectacularly camp world" and noted that "there's a bit of cheeky, sci-fi B movie references in the presentation but the content [of the album] itself is pristine pop fun."

By reflecting the everyday into science fiction contexts that incorporate video game, comic book and cyberpunk imagery, Doja manages to conquer these landscapes, her psychedelic qualities on full display. This manages to solve the divide between Afro-futurism's darker side and suburban leisure's levity: Doja Cat sees the future as the possibility for utopia and connects it to its roots in current iconography.

— John Wohlmacher in an album review for Beats Per Minute.

== Composition ==
"Naked"
One of the primary topics explored in Planet Her is that of lust. In the second track "Naked", Doja Cat invites her partner to remove both of their clothes. Delivered in a "frisky" and "high-energy" tone, her singing is accompanied by a reggaeton beat and driven by pulsing bass.

Planet Her is primarily a pop, hip-hop, and R&B record. It incorporates musical elements from a wide range of genres, such as afrobeats, reggaeton, hyperpop,, trap and pop-rap. The album opens with a string of "funky," "fun" and "upbeat" tracks and towards the second half, the tempo mostly slows down for the more "introspective" tracks and Doja Cat "drifts from her usual raunchy lyricism to try out lovesick lullabies and heartbreak ballads, allowing the music to slow and a newfound vulnerability to emerge."

The opening track, "Woman", is "an empowering, unabashed ode to womanhood and feminine diversity" which also explores the thoughts, emotions and woes of being a woman. It's a bright, sexy and high-energy afrobeat song. In the lyrics, Doja Cat also details how patriarchy often tries to create competition by putting women against each other. The next track "Naked" features a reggaeton rhythm and is led by a "sultry" and "high-energy" vocal performance. Both "Woman" and "Naked" are driven by steel drums and pulsing bass.

"Been Like This"
Set to pitched background vocals and a trap-style rhythm, "Been Like This" is a melancholic ballad where Doja Cat introspects about an unhealthy relationship. Billboard described the song as having rap and R&B elements, as well as the "slickest combination" of Doja Cat's various musical styles.

The third track, "Payday", celebrates Doja Cat's wealth and fame in a high register, as she sings "I just can't believe I got what I wanted all my life". "Get Into It (Yuh)" is a tribute to rapper Nicki Minaj, whom Doja Cat pays respect to by saying "Thank you Nicki, I love you!" towards the end of the song, and references her debut single "Massive Attack". "Need to Know" is a "grinding sex jam" sung over an "icy" trap and R&B instrumental. Throughout the song, Doja Cat's "dense triplet flow is layered over futuristic disco production. "I Don't Do Drugs" featuring American singer Ariana Grande was described as a "masterclass in the airy R&B vibe" found in most of Grande's work. Its "candy-coated" production is driven by "whimsical xylophone" and "exploding bass". "Love to Dream" is a wistful space-age pop and R&B ballad driven by a downcast, distorted guitar lead and Doja Cat's high "crystalline falsetto" vocals.

"You Right", a duet with Canadian singer the Weeknd is a slow, seductive song inspired by classic 1990s R&B. It's been described as a "sexy, atmospheric slow-burn" driven by "slick and twinkling keyboards". Over the gentle trap beat and through pitched down vocals of "Been Like This", Doja Cat processes her shifting feelings for a partner after noticing how they've changed and become more toxic, making it one of the most reflective on the album. "Options" featuring American rapper JID is a "solid rap song" which features 808s. "Ain't Shit" was noted to feature Doja Cat's "rapped eye rolls", a "falsetto refrain", and a "fed up attitude of the opposite sex". The sparkly, midtempo production on "Imagine" combines a trap bassline with traditional East Asian music. The penultimate song, "Alone", recalls a 2000s blend of pop and R&B. The final track on the standard edition, "Kiss Me More" featuring American singer SZA, is a disco-influenced ode to kissing. It has been described as "breezy", "flirtatious" and "cheeky".

== Release and promotion ==
Doja Cat first introduced the term "Planet Her" in August 2020 during the opening sequence of her performance at the 2020 MTV Video Music Awards, where she impersonated a television commentator and stated "Performing live on Planet Her is Doja Cat. Enjoy!". In late December 2020, she began subliminally teasing the album on Twitter by repeatedly tweeting the phrase "Planet Her 2021" over the course of a few weeks. On January 5, 2021, Doja Cat followed eight musicians on the platform and subsequently tweeted "Following them for a reason. Guess why.", alluding to imminent collaborations with the followed artists.

The title of the album, Planet Her, was confirmed in an interview with American magazine V in March 2021. The existence of the track "Kiss Me More", featuring SZA, was confirmed in the same interview. In the following month, Doja Cat revealed that the song "You Right" with the Weeknd would serve as the second single from Planet Her in a cover story interview with Billboard. The existence of the track "Need to Know" was also revealed at the same time. After announcing the release of this song as a promotional single on June 9, Doja Cat then used social media to announce the album's release date and reveal the artwork and track listing on June 10. The album was made available for pre-order on June 11, the same day "Need to Know" was released.

Planet Her was issued worldwide on June 25, 2021, at midnight local time, by Kemosabe and RCA Records, Doja Cat's third to be released under this contract. The standard edition has only yet been released on digital download and streaming formats, with a limited release of only a few thousand CDs on Doja Cat's online store. A deluxe edition of the album was released two days later on June 27, to digital download and streaming formats. The deluxe edition was released on CD format internationally on December 10, 2021. An LP format of the deluxe edition was released on May 27, 2022.

=== Singles ===
"Kiss Me More" with SZA, was released as the lead single off the album on April 9, 2021. The song was serviced to contemporary hit radio, rhythmic contemporary radio and adult contemporary radio formats in the United States, as well as on contemporary hit radio formats in Russia and Italy. It topped the charts in New Zealand, Malaysia and Singapore, and also reached the top 5 in over a dozen countries such as the United States (No. 3), Canada (No. 5), the United Kingdom (No. 3), Australia (No. 2) and Ireland (No. 2). The song also became Doja Cat's second-ever song to reach number one on both Billboard's US Rhythmic and Top 40 radio charts. It has been awarded certification status in half a dozen countries, including double platinum in the United Kingdom from the British Phonographic Industry (BPI), and platinum in Australia from the Australian Recording Industry Association (ARIA).

"You Right" with the Weeknd was released as the second official single in tandem with Planet Her and its Quentin Deronzier-directed music video on June 25, 2021. The song debuted at number 11 in the United States, Australia, and Ireland, and peaked within the top 10 in Canada (No. 10), New Zealand (No. 6), and the United Kingdom (No. 9).

"Need to Know" was initially released as the first promotional single from the record on June 11, 2021, after having been announced two days earlier. After gaining traction on TikTok, it impacted rhythmic contemporary radio as the album's third single on August 31, 2021. Its corresponding music video was directed by duo Miles & AJ and features cameo appearances from Canadian musician Grimes and American actress Ryan Destiny. With little to no airplay, the song debuted at number 29 on the Billboard Global 200 as well as within the top 40 of countries such as Australia, New Zealand, Ireland, the United Kingdom, and the United States. It eventually peaked at number eight in the United States, becoming Doja Cat's fourth top ten hit (second from the album), outperforming "You Right", which was intended to be the "more important single".

The track "Woman" had started gaining popularity on TikTok in August 2021 after a dance challenge was created by Tracy Joseph. This brought the track to re-enter at the US Billboard Hot 100 at 84, peaking at #7 in May 2022, the third top 10 from the album; a sleeper hit. and debut on the UK Singles Chart at 26. It earned even higher chart placements across Europe. It was eventually released as the fourth single, impacting Italian contemporary radio on October 1, 2021, and US rhythmic contemporary radio on January 11, 2022.

The song "Get Into It (Yuh)" followed a similar resurgence with choreography from TikTok user David Vu, which helped it re-enter the Hot 100 at number 75. It was sent to Italian radio stations as the fifth single from the album on March 11, 2022, as well as US rhythmic contemporary radio on March 29, 2022, and US contemporary hit radio on April 5, 2022.

==== Other songs ====
While on Instagram livestream in August 2020, Doja Cat hinted at her plans of releasing the song "Ain't Shit" as a single under the title "N.A.S", but this release failed to materialize. She had previewed the song on another Instagram livestream in early April 2020, and it soon gained traction on the video-sharing platform TikTok. With its continued success on the platform following the album's release, it became the highest-charting non-single, debuting at 24 on the US Billboard Hot 100. As of August 19, 2021, the album tracks "Ain't Shit" and "Get Into It (Yuh)" had amassed 655.7 thousand and 176.4 thousand user-created videos on TikTok.

=== Live performances ===
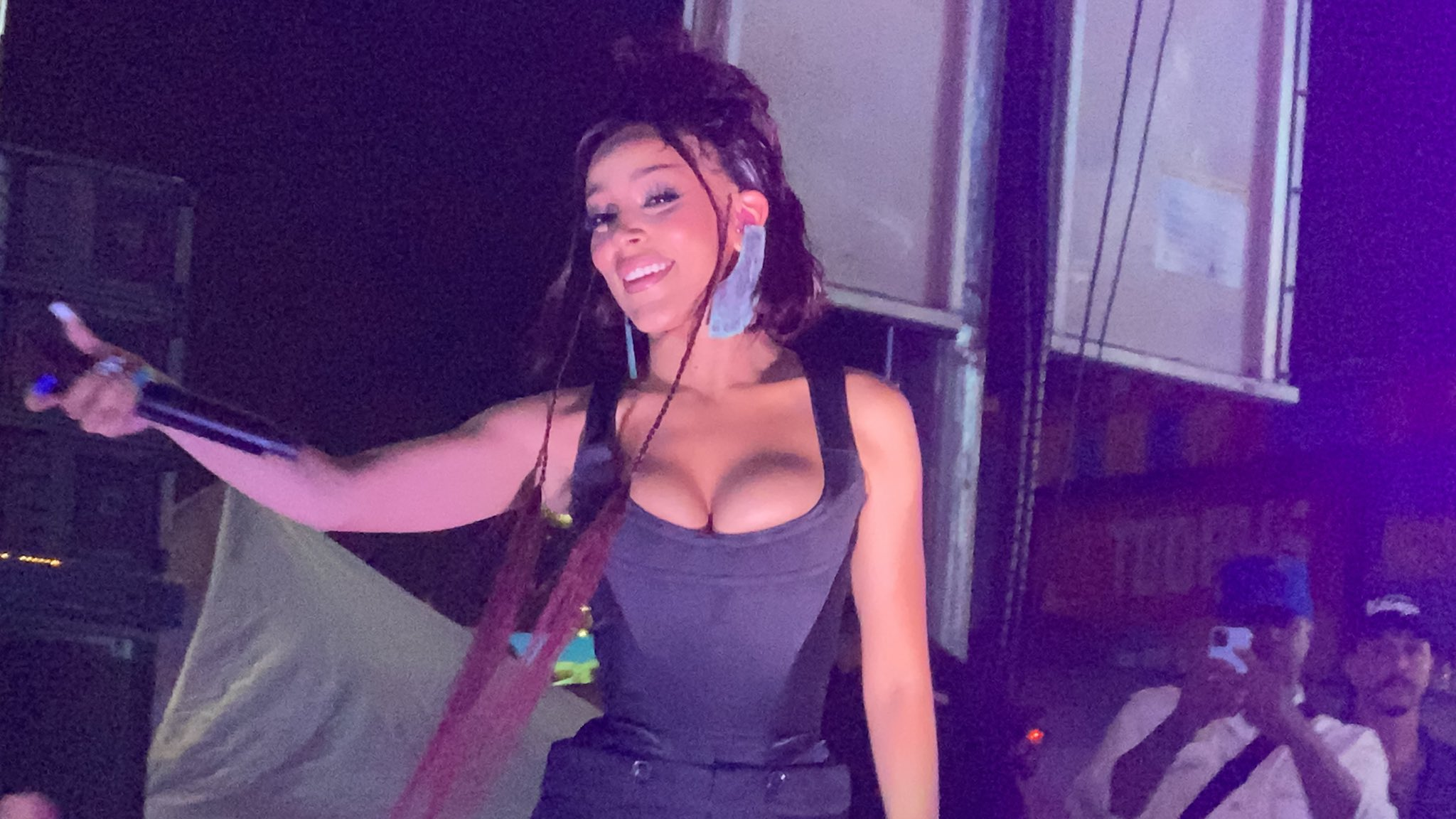
Doja Cat performed five songs from Planet Her for the first time in the pictured Coney Island concert on July 4, 2021.

Doja Cat performed a solo version of "Kiss Me More" for the first time at Triller's inaugural Fight Club event in April 2021. At the 2021 Billboard Music Awards in May 2021, Doja Cat and SZA performed the song together. Doja Cat again performed a solo version of the song within a medley at the 2021 iHeartRadio Music Awards later that month. During a solo virtual concert as part of American Express's "Unstaged" campaign in June 2021, SZA performed her verse from the song as well as the introduction and chorus usually sung by Doja Cat. She performed it in the same manner during a solo virtual concert as part of Grey Goose's "In Dream" campaign on July 2, 2021.

To celebrate both the release of Planet Her and Independence Day, American live music company The Day Party hosted a Doja Cat concert at Coney Art Walls in New York City on July 4, 2021. It was here where she performed five songs from the record, notably debuting "Get Into It (Yuh)", "Ain't Shit", "Need to Know" and "Woman". On July 10, she continued to celebrate the album release at a private nightclub in Miami, where she notably slipped and fell while on stage and earned praise for playing it off and carrying on with the performance. Throughout July and August 2021, music video network company Vevo conducted a series of Doja Cat performances of songs from Planet Her, all filmed on a set with gold structures amongst a Californian desert; her performance of album track "Ain't Shit" was published on July 3, followed by a performance of "Love to Dream" on July 6, and then "Need to Know" on August 6. Doja Cat performed six Planet Her tracks during a set at the Made in America Festival in Philadelphia. While suspended in the air at the 2021 MTV Video Music Awards ceremony later that month, she performed "Been Like This" for the first time, followed by a solo version of "You Right" featuring her additional verse from the extended mix.

== Critical reception ==
Professional ratings
Aggregate scores
Source	Rating
AnyDecentMusic?	6.7/10
Metacritic	76/100
Review scores
Source	Rating
AllMusic	4/5 stars
The A.V. Club	C+
Clash	7/10
Entertainment Weekly	B+
Evening Standard	4/5 stars
Exclaim!	9/10
The Guardian	3/5 stars
NME	4/5 stars
Pitchfork	7.8/10
Rolling Stone	4/5 stars

According to the review aggregator Metacritic, Planet Her received "generally favorable reviews" based on a weighted average score of 76 out of 100 from 14 critic scores. Rolling Stone wrote that despite it being her third record, Planet Her "feels like a debut". Exclaim! wrote that it has "no skips" and that it "showcases many sides to Doja but remains cohesive". The New Yorker expressed that it brings her "genre fluidity into perfect synthesis, building upon the pop-rap legacy established by her predecessor Nicki Minaj," noting that "Doja relishes stimulation, from paydays to addictive intimacy." The New York Times described the record as "outlandish, eccentric, lustrous, mercenarily maximalist pop".

Brandon Yu of Mic wrote that Planet Her "crystallizes her effortless, playful energy into a delightfully shape-shifting work. [...] she manages to execute a varied set of identity-swapping performances in a way that feels like a natural mark of her studied, eclectic talents rather than an exercise in chasing trends." Safy-Hallan Farah of Pitchfork described Planet Her as "a kaleidoscope of pop versatility that benefits greatly from a market that currently values eclecticism. It feels both premeditated and casual, well-crafted yet trenchantly frivolous." Farah wrote that Doja Cat "entertains and enthralls with minimal effort, especially in her delivery" as she "skates" on the record's "impeccable" production. She noted that above all else, Doja Cat's "candy-sweet melodies are the star" of the record. Using "Ain't Shit" as an example, Nick Levine of NME wrote that Doja Cat's lyrics "possess a plain-speaking power," while stressing that "it's not so much what she says, but the way that she says it." Beats Per Minute described Planet Her as "the type of pop album there should be more of: both playful and psychedelic, rich in intelligent production, and filled with charismatic and chameleonic performances," noting that Doja Cat "understands the appeal of both the pop-star spectre and syrupy production; everything on Planet Her is contained and refined, but never polished to a fault. She inhabits different characters and moods, her voice never wavering or coming across as too thin for what she attempts."

Alexis Petridis of The Guardian described Planet Her as a "light, summery, really well-produced and impressively concise record" with "music that plays to Doja Cat's strengths. She can genuinely sing as well as rap – she doesn't sound out of her depth duetting with Grande," noting that she's a skilled lyricist on "flippant and funny" topics rather than essaying weighty topics. He wrote that the album has "music with enough room for a degree of experimentation" but, however, was perplexed by how "an artist so evidently concerned with not taxing her listeners' attention spans" could get away with the "tedi[ous]" string of "insubstantial ballads". Craig Jenkins of Vulture described Planet Her as Doja Cat's best album to date and described her as "our new ice-cool pop-queen supreme". Gabrielle Sanchez of The A.V. Club wrote that the record "lacks the originality Doja made her name on" as she "loses herself in the pop space" with "predictable, uninspired sounds". Cinquemani of Slant Magazine felt that, other than "Kiss Me More", the rest of the album "leans heavily" on contemporary sounds, making it "hard to differentiate it from any number of other recent R&B efforts".

== Commercial performance ==
In the United States, Planet Her became Doja Cat's highest-charting album as it debuted at number two on the Billboard 200 after moving 109,000 album-equivalent units. It additionally topped the Billboard Top R&B Albums chart, and in the following week, propelled up to number one on the US Top R&B/Hip-Hop Albums chart and remained at number two on the Billboard 200 after moving 68,000 units. When the album spent a third consecutive week at number two, it became the first album to spend its first three weeks at number two on the chart since The Pinkprint (2014) by Nicki Minaj in 2015. Planet Her spent another five weeks within the top 5 of the Billboard 200 with over 55,000 units earned each week; it re-peaked at number two in its eight-week on chart, moving 1,000 units less than Billie Eilish's Happier Than Ever (2021). On March 21, 2022, Planet Her became the first album by a female rapper in history to spend 33 weeks in Billboard 200’s Top 10.

Commenting on the album's stable run on the Billboard 200, Billboard writer Kyle Denis said "Planet Her and its singles have unequivocally solidified Doja Cat as one of the defining pop stars of [Generation Z] era", bolstered by the TikTok appeal of her music, her "A-list" collaborations, "exciting" television performances, and social media presence.

In Australia, Planet Her opened at number 3 where it remained at for another two weeks, while dethroning Call Me if You Get Lost on its second week on the Top 40 Hip-Hop/R&B Albums chart, where it stayed at number one for yet another week. It spent eight consecutive weeks in the top 3 of the New Zealand Albums Chart, reaching number one its eighth week charting. In the United Kingdom, Planet Her debuted at number three on the UK Albums Chart where it remained for another week before dropping to number five in its third week. It was certified Silver by the British Phonographic Industry (BPI) in early September 2021, denoting 60,000 sales in the country. On the Irish Albums Chart it debuted at number four and remained in this position for another two weeks, before peaking at number 3 in its fourth week.

With over 1,510,000 album-equivalent units sold in the US in 2021, MRC Data ranked Planet Her the biggest R&B album of the year and sixth best-selling album overall. According to the International Federation of the Phonographic Industry (IFPI), it was the tenth best-selling album of the year on all platforms worldwide in 2021, despite having a limited physical release.

== Accolades ==
=== Industry awards ===
Doja Cat received eight nominations at the 64th Annual Grammy Awards, six coming from the album, including Album of the Year and Best Pop Vocal Album for Planet Her; Song of the Year, Record of the Year and Best Pop Duo/Group Performance for "Kiss Me More" featuring SZA; and Best Melodic Rap Performance for "Need to Know". "Kiss Me More" also won in the "Best Collaboration" categories at the 2021 American Music Awards, the 2021 MTV Video Music Awards, and the 2021 MTV Europe Music Awards. The album received a nomination for Album of the Year at the BET Awards 2022. Subsequently, "Woman" was nominated thrice at the 65th Annual Grammy Awards (as the song was a sleeper hit) for Record of the Year, Best Pop Solo Performance, and Best Music Video.

Awards and nominations for Planet Her
Organization	Year	Award	Result	Ref.
BET Awards	2022	Album of the Year	Nominated	
Billboard Music Awards	2022	Top Billboard 200 Album	Nominated	
Billboard Music Awards	2022	Top R&B Album	Won	
American Music Awards	2021	Favorite R&B Album	Won	
ARIA Music Awards	2021	Best International Artist (Planet Her)	Nominated	
Soul Train Music Awards	2021	Album of the Year	Nominated	
Grammy Awards	2022	Album of the Year (Note: Credited to the album's standard deluxe version.)	Nominated	
Grammy Awards	2022	Best Pop Vocal Album	Nominated	
People's Choice Awards	2021	The Album of 2021	Nominated	
XXL Awards	2022	Album of the Year	Nominated	

=== Year-end lists ===
Planet Her appeared on many year-end best-of lists of 2021 ranked by critics and publications.

Select Year-end rankings of Planet Her
Publication	List	Rank	Ref.
Billboard	The 50 Best Albums of 2021	5	
Consequence	Top 50 Albums of 2021	13	
Gigwise	The 51 Best Albums of 2021	45	
Los Angeles Times	The 10 best albums of 2021	8	
The New York Times	Jon Caramanica's Best Albums of 2021	12	
NME	The 50 Best Albums of 2021	50	
NPR Music	The 50 Best Albums of 2021	31	
People	The Top 10 Albums of 2021	7	
Rolling Stone	The 50 Best Albums of 2021	21	
Rolling Stone	The 20 Best Hip-Hop Albums of 2021	6	
Slant Magazine	The 50 Best Albums of 2021	29	

== Track listing ==
Standard edition
No.	Title	Lyrics	Music	Producer(s)	Length
1.	"Woman"	Amala Dlamini; Jidenna Mobisson; Lydia Asrat	David Sprecher; Linden Jay; Aaron Horn; Ainsley Jones	Yeti Beats; Linden Jay; Aynzli Jones^{[a]}; Crate Classics^{[a]}	2:52
2.	"Naked"	Dlamini	Kurtis McKenzie; Alexander Shuckburgh; Marcus Joons; Daniel Tjäder	Kurtis McKenzie; Al Shux	3:43
3.	"Payday" (featuring Young Thug)	Dlamini; Jeffery Lamar Williams	Ari Starace	Y2K	3:33
4.	"Get Into It (Yuh)"	Dlamini	Starace; Sheldon Cheung	Y2K; Sully	2:18
5.	"Need to Know"	Dlamini	Lukasz Gottwald	Dr. Luke	3:30
6.	"I Don't Do Drugs" (featuring Ariana Grande)	Dlamini; Grande	Starace; Cheung	Y2K; Sully	3:09
7.	"Love to Dream"	Dlamini	McKenzie; Jamil Chammas; Khaled Rohaim; Maciej Margol-Gromada; Siddharth Mallick	McKenzie; Digi; Khaled Rohaim	3:36
8.	"You Right" (with the Weeknd)	Dlamini; Abel Tesfaye	Gottwald	Dr. Luke	3:06
9.	"Been Like This"	Dlamini	Gerard A. Powell II; Aaron Booe; Sprecher; Margaux Whitney	Tizhimself; Aaron Bow; Yeti Beats^{[b]}	2:57
10.	"Options" (featuring JID)	Dlamini; Destin Route	Starace; Andrew Cohen	Y2K; Mayer Hawthorne	2:39
11.	"Ain't Shit"	Dlamini	Powell; Rogét Chahayed; Sprecher; McKenzie	Tizhimself; Rogét Chahayed; Yeti Beats^{[b]}; McKenzie^{[b]}	2:54
12.	"Imagine"	Dlamini	Powell; Michael Hector	Tizhimself; Mike Hector	2:28
13.	"Alone"	Dlamini	Sprecher; Jay; Antwoine Collins; Geordan Reid-Campbell; Laura Roy	Yeti Beats; Jay^{[a]}; Troy Nöka^{[b]}	3:48
14.	"Kiss Me More" (featuring SZA)	Dlamini; Solána Rowe	Sprecher; Chahayed; Powell; Gottwald; Stephen Kipner; Terry Shaddick; Carter Lang	Chahayed; Yeti Beats; Tizhimself^{[b]}; Carter Lang^{[b]}	3:28
Total length:					44:06

Deluxe edition
No.	Title	Lyrics	Music	Producer(s)	Length
15.	"You Right" (extended; with the Weeknd)	Dlamini; Tesfaye	Gottwald	Dr. Luke	4:08
16.	"Up and Down"	Dlamini	McKenzie; Margol-Gromada; Lee Stashenko	McKenzie; Margol-Gromada; Fallen	2:31
17.	"Tonight" (featuring Eve)	Dlamini; Taneisha Jackson; Eve Jihan Cooper	Gottwald; Rob Tewlow	Dr. Luke; Reef	2:48
18.	"Ride"	Dlamini	Sprecher; Ilana Armida	Bandana; Yeti Beats; Ilana Armida	2:56
19.	"Why Why" (featuring Gunna)	Dlamini; Sergio Giavanni Kitchens	Starace; Chueng	Y2K; Sully	2:58
Total length:					59:28

=== Notes ===
- ^{^[a]} indicates a co-producer
- ^{^[b]} indicates a miscellaneous producer
- On clean versions of the album, "Ain't Shit" is excluded from the tracklist, due to the explicit nature of the chorus.

=== Sampling credits ===
- "Naked" samples "Here In Iowa" (2015), written by Marcus Erik Joons and Daniel Gustav Peter Tjaeder, and performed by Korallreven.
- "Kiss Me More" interpolates "Physical" (1981), written by Steve Kipner and Terry Shaddick, and performed by Olivia Newton-John.

== Credits and personnel ==
=== Performers ===
- Doja Cat – lead vocals
- The Weeknd – featured vocals (track 8, 15)
- Young Thug – featured vocals (track 3)
- Ariana Grande – featured vocals (track 6)
- JID – featured vocals (track 10)
- SZA – featured vocals (track 14)
- Eve – featured vocals (track 17)
- Gunna – featured vocals (track 19)
- Aynzli Jones – background vocals (track 1)
- Jidenna – background vocals (track 1)
- Victoria Monét – background vocals (track 6)

=== Technical ===
- Doja Cat – executive production, vocal production, vocal engineering
- Yeti Beats – executive production
- Mike Bozzi – mastering (tracks 1, 2, 5, 8, 9, 11, 13, 14)
- Dale Becker – mastering (tracks 3, 4, 6, 7, 10, 12)
- Jesse Ray Ernster – mixing (tracks 1, 2)
- Jeff Ellis – mixing (tracks 3, 4, 6, 7, 10, 12)
- Serban Ghenea – mixing (tracks 5, 8, 14)
- Clint Gibbs – mixing (track 9)
- Neal H Pogue – mixing (tracks 11, 13)
- Katrina Maria Ernster – engineering (tracks 1, 2)
- Kayla Reagan – engineering (tracks 3, 4, 6, 7, 10, 12)
- John Hanes – engineering (tracks 5, 8, 14)
- Joe Visciano – engineering (track 14)
- Noah "MixGiant" Glassman – assistant engineering (tracks 1, 2)
- Connor Hedge – assistant engineering (tracks 3, 4, 6, 7, 10, 12)
- Fili Filizzola – assistant engineering (tracks 3, 4, 6, 7, 10, 12)
- Hector Vega – assistant engineering (tracks 3, 4, 6, 7, 10, 12)
- Rob Moreno – assistant engineering (tracks 3, 6, 11)
- Davide Cinci – assistant engineering (tracks 12–14)
- Rian Lewis – recording (tracks 1–4, 6, 8, 11–14)

== Charts ==
=== Weekly charts ===
Chart performance for Planet Her
Chart (2021–2022)	Peak position
Australian Albums (ARIA)	2
Austrian Albums (Ö3 Austria)	6
Belgian Albums (Ultratop Flanders)	6
Belgian Albums (Ultratop Wallonia)	14
Canadian Albums (Billboard)	2
Danish Albums (Hitlisten)	3
Dutch Albums (Album Top 100)	3
Finnish Albums (Suomen virallinen lista)	5
French Albums (SNEP)	13
German Albums (Offizielle Top 100)	29
Icelandic Albums (Tónlistinn)	5
Irish Albums (Official Charts)	3
Italian Albums (FIMI)	14
Lithuanian Albums (AGATA)	1
New Zealand Albums (RMNZ)	1
Norwegian Albums (VG-lista)	2
Portuguese Albums (AFP)	4
Scottish Albums (Official Charts)	58
Slovak Albums (ČNS IFPI)	90
Spanish Albums (Promusicae)	13
Swedish Albums (Sverigetopplistan)	2
Swiss Albums (Schweizer Hitparade)	11
UK Albums (Official Charts)	3
US Billboard 200	2
US Top R&B/Hip-Hop Albums (Billboard)	1
US Indie Store Album Sales (Billboard)	2

Chart (2025–2026)	Peak position
Portuguese Albums (AFP) Deluxe version	55

=== Year-end charts ===
2021 year-end chart performance for Planet Her
Chart (2021)	Position
Australian Albums (ARIA)	8
Austrian Albums (Ö3 Austria)	62
Belgian Albums (Ultratop Flanders)	54
Belgian Albums (Ultratop Wallonia)	111
Canadian Albums (Billboard)	18
Danish Albums (Hitlisten)	17
Dutch Albums (Album Top 100)	15
French Albums (SNEP)	82
Icelandic Albums (Tónlistinn)	18
Irish Albums (IRMA)	17
Italian Albums (FIMI)	93
New Zealand Albums (RMNZ)	5
Norwegian Albums (VG-lista)	7
Spanish Albums (PROMUSICAE)	78
Swedish Albums (Sverigetopplistan)	35
UK Albums (OCC)	18
US Billboard 200	20
US Top R&B/Hip-Hop Albums (Billboard)	8

2022 year-end chart performance for Planet Her
Chart (2022)	Position
Australian Albums (ARIA)	6
Belgian Albums (Ultratop Flanders)	64
Belgian Albums (Ultratop Wallonia)	125
Canadian Albums (Billboard)	9
Danish Albums (Hitlisten)	37
Dutch Albums (Album Top 100)	40
French Albums (SNEP)	106
Icelandic Albums (Tónlistinn)	23
Lithuanian Albums (AGATA)	6
New Zealand Albums (RMNZ)	5
Norwegian Albums (VG-lista)	20
Spanish Albums (PROMUSICAE)	89
Swedish Albums (Sverigetopplistan)	68
UK Albums (OCC)	24
US Billboard 200	11
US Top R&B/Hip-Hop Albums (Billboard)	3

2023 year-end chart performance for Planet Her
Chart (2023)	Position
Australian Albums (ARIA)	55
French Albums (SNEP)	194
New Zealand Albums (RMNZ)	38
US Billboard 200	56
US Top R&B/Hip-Hop Albums (Billboard)	21

2024 year-end chart performance for Planet Her
Chart (2024)	Position
Australian Hip Hop/R&B Albums (ARIA)	28
US Billboard 200	114
US Top R&B/Hip-Hop Albums (Billboard)	59

== Certifications and sales ==
Certifications and sales for Planet Her
Region	Certification	Certified units/sales
Australia (ARIA)	2× Platinum	140,000^{‡}
Brazil (Pro-Música Brasil)	Diamond	160,000^{‡}
Canada (Music Canada)	2× Platinum	160,000^{‡}
Denmark (IFPI Danmark)	2× Platinum	40,000^{‡}
France (SNEP)	Platinum	100,000^{‡}
Iceland (FHF)	—	1,757
Italy (FIMI)	Platinum	50,000^{‡}
Mexico (AMPROFON)	Platinum+Gold	210,000^{‡}
New Zealand (RMNZ)	5× Platinum	75,000^{‡}
Norway (IFPI Norway)	Platinum	20,000^{‡}
Poland (ZPAV)	2× Platinum	40,000^{‡}
Portugal (AFP)	Gold	3,500^{‡}
Singapore (RIAS)	Gold	5,000^{*}
Sweden (GLF)	Platinum	30,000^{‡}
Switzerland (IFPI Switzerland)	Gold	10,000^{‡}
United Kingdom (BPI)	Platinum	300,000^{‡}
United States (RIAA)	2× Platinum	3,000,000
^{*} Sales figures based on certification alone.^{‡} Sales+streaming figures based on certification alone.

== Release history ==
Release dates and formats for Planet Her
Region	Date	Format(s)	Version	Label	Ref.
Various	June 25, 2021	Digital download; streaming	Standard	Kemosabe; RCA (Note: Except for the UK, where Ministry of Sound releases music by Doja Cat.)	
Various	June 25, 2021	Limited edition CD	Standard	Kemosabe; RCA	
Various	June 27, 2021	Digital download; streaming	Deluxe	Kemosabe; RCA	
Various	December 10, 2021	CD	Deluxe	Kemosabe; RCA	
Japan	January 19, 2022	CD	Deluxe	Sony Music	
Various	May 27, 2022	LP	Deluxe	Kemosabe; RCA	

== See also ==
- List of 2021 albums
- List of Billboard number-one R&B/hip-hop albums of 2021
- List of number-one albums from the 2020s (New Zealand)
- List of UK top-ten albums in 2021
