= Woman (Doja Cat song) =

2021 single by Doja Cat

Single by Doja Cat

from the album Planet Her
- Released: October 1, 2021
- Recorded: 2020
- Studio: The Sound Factory (Los Angeles, California)
- Genre: Afrobeats
- Length: 2:52
- Label: Kemosabe; RCA
- Songwriters: Amala Zandile Dlamini; Jidenna Mobisson; Lydia Asrat; David Sprecher; Linden Jay; Aaron Horn; Ainsley Jones
- Producers: Linden Jay; Aynzli Jones; Yeti Beats; Crate Classics

Doja Cat singles chronology
"Need to Know" (2021)	"Woman" (2021)	"Handstand" (2021)

Music video
- "Woman" on YouTube

"Woman" is a song by American rapper and singer Doja Cat from her third studio album Planet Her (2021). It has been described as an Afrobeats track infused with pop, R&B, and reggae inflections, with the lyrical themes of divine femininity and feminism. After gaining popularity in Europe, where it entered the top 10 in countries like Greece, France, Denmark, Switzerland, Lithuania and Portugal, the song impacted Italian radio airplay as the album's fourth single on October 1, 2021. It was sent to American mainstream and rhythmic contemporary radios on December 14, 2021. The song was a sleeper success, spending several months on the charts before slowly climbing to the top 10. For the chart dated May 7, 2022, the song reached number seven on the Billboard Hot 100, nearly a year after it debuted.

== Composition ==
Music journalists have called the song "an empowering, unabashed ode to womanhood and feminine diversity" which also "explores the thoughts, emotions and woes of being a woman". A bright, high-energy Afrobeats song, it has also been described as a fusion of pop, R&B, and reggae. It was co-written by American rapper Jidenna who also provides background vocals to the track. In the lyrics, Doja Cat also details how patriarchy often tries to create competition by putting women against each other, and thus makes a reference to Regina George from Mean Girls (2004). Critics compared her vocal delivery on the track to that of Rihanna (whom she name-drops in the song), and her rap delivery to that of Kendrick Lamar.

== Critical reception ==
Rosemary Akpan of Exclaim! wrote that "in typical Doja fashion, she's still able to deliver her usual quick-witted bars, complemented by a catchy chorus."

== Music video ==
The song's music video was released on December 3, 2021. It takes inspiration from Michael Jackson's video "Remember the Time." It stars Teyana Taylor alongside actress and model Guetcha. The plot elements and setting of the video take inspiration from the film Dune. In collaboration with Girls Who Code, "Woman" became the first codable music video in which fans will be able to make their own edits in JavaScript, Python or CSS using DojaCode.

== Accolades ==
Awards and nominations for "Woman"
Organization	Year	Category	Result	Ref.
BET Awards	2022	BET Her Award	Nominated	
BET Hip-Hop Awards	2022	Impact Track	Nominated	
iHeartRadio Titanium Awards	2022	1 Billion Total Audience Spins on iHeartRadio Stations	Won	
MTV Video Music Awards	2022	Video of the Year	Nominated	
MTV Video Music Awards	2022	Song of the Year	Nominated	
MTV Video Music Awards	2022	Best Pop Video	Nominated	
MTV Video Music Awards	2022	Best Choreography	Won	
MTV Europe Music Awards	2022	Best Video	Nominated	
Soul Train Music Awards	2022	Best Dance Performance	Nominated	
BMI Pop Awards	2023	Award-Winning Song	Won	
BMI R&B/Hip-Hop Awards	2023	Award-Winning Song	Won	
Grammy Awards	2023	Record of the Year	Nominated	
Grammy Awards	2023	Best Pop Solo Performance	Nominated	
Grammy Awards	2023	Best Music Video	Nominated	
iHeartRadio Music Awards	2023	Song of the Year	Nominated	
iHeartRadio Music Awards	2023	TikTok Bop of the Year	Nominated	

== Charts ==
=== Weekly charts ===
Weekly chart performance for "Woman"
Chart (2021–2022)	Peak position
Argentina Hot 100 (Billboard)	77
Australia (ARIA)	16
Austria (Ö3 Austria Top 40)	17
Belgium (Ultratop 50 Flanders)	30
Belgium (Ultratop 50 Wallonia)	10
Canada Hot 100 (Billboard)	12
Canada AC (Billboard)	41
Canada CHR/Top 40 (Billboard)	2
Canada Hot AC (Billboard)	20
Croatia International (HRT)	47
Czech Republic Singles Digital (ČNS IFPI)	13
Denmark (Tracklisten)	9
Dominican Republic (SODINPRO)	32
Finland (Suomen virallinen lista)	17
France (SNEP)	8
Germany (GfK)	18
Global 200 (Billboard)	11
Greece International (IFPI)	5
Hungary (Rádiós Top 40)	25
Hungary (Single Top 40)	21
Hungary (Stream Top 40)	16
Iceland (Tónlistinn)	19
India International Singles (IMI)	5
Ireland (IRMA)	11
Israel (Media Forest)	12
Italy (FIMI)	59
Lithuania (AGATA)	7
Luxembourg (Billboard)	20
Malaysia (RIM)	12
Netherlands (Dutch Top 40)	30
Netherlands (Single Top 100)	12
New Zealand (Recorded Music NZ)	9
Norway (VG-lista)	20
Panama (PRODUCE)	25
Paraguay (SGP)	97
Peru (UNIMPRO)	30
Portugal (AFP)	6
Romania (Airplay 100)	79
San Marino (SMRRTV Top 50)	35
Singapore (RIAS)	8
Slovakia Airplay (ČNS IFPI)	39
Slovakia Singles Digital (ČNS IFPI)	11
South Africa (TOSAC)	28
Spain (Promusicae)	79
Sweden (Sverigetopplistan)	44
Switzerland (Schweizer Hitparade)	7
UK Singles (Official Charts)	13
US Billboard Hot 100	7
US Adult Contemporary (Billboard)	26
US Adult Pop Airplay (Billboard)	32
US Dance Airplay (Billboard)	11
US Hot R&B/Hip-Hop Songs (Billboard)	2
US Pop Airplay (Billboard)	1
US R&B/Hip-Hop Airplay (Billboard)	38
US Rhythmic Airplay (Billboard)	1
US Rolling Stone Top 100	39

=== Year-end charts ===
2021 year-end chart performance for "Woman"
Chart (2021)	Position
Belgium (Ultratop Wallonia)	64
Canada (Canadian Hot 100)	99
Denmark (Tracklisten)	91
France (SNEP)	65
Germany (Official German Charts)	95
Global 200 (Billboard)	99
Hungary (Stream Top 40)	60
Netherlands (Single Top 100)	64
Portugal (AFP)	40
Switzerland (Schweizer Hitparade)	60
UK Singles (OCC)	79
US Hot R&B/Hip-Hop Songs (Billboard)	69

2022 year-end chart performance for "Woman"
Chart (2022)	Position
Australia (ARIA)	42
Belgium (Ultratop Flanders)	138
Belgium (Ultratop Wallonia)	81
Canada (Canadian Hot 100)	28
Chile (Monitor Latino)	89
France (SNEP)	98
Global 200 (Billboard)	22
Hungary (Stream Top 40)	100
Iceland (Tónlistinn)	63
Lithuania (AGATA)	25
New Zealand (Recorded Music NZ)	33
Puerto Rico (Monitor Latino)	57
Switzerland (Schweizer Hitparade)	67
UK Singles (OCC)	87
US Billboard Hot 100	21
US Hot R&B/Hip-Hop Songs (Billboard)	9
US Mainstream Top 40 (Billboard)	13
US Rhythmic (Billboard)	5

== Certifications ==
Certifications for "Woman"
Region	Certification	Certified units/sales
Australia (ARIA)	4× Platinum	280,000^{‡}
Austria (IFPI Austria)	Platinum	30,000^{‡}
Belgium (BRMA)	Platinum	40,000^{‡}
Brazil (Pro-Música Brasil)	3× Diamond	480,000^{‡}
Canada (Music Canada)	7× Platinum	560,000^{‡}
Denmark (IFPI Danmark)	Platinum	90,000^{‡}
France (SNEP)	Diamond	333,333^{‡}
Germany (BVMI)	Gold	200,000^{‡}
Italy (FIMI)	Platinum	100,000^{‡}
Mexico (AMPROFON)	3× Platinum+Gold	490,000^{‡}
New Zealand (RMNZ)	4× Platinum	120,000^{‡}
Norway (IFPI Norway)	Gold	30,000^{‡}
Poland (ZPAV)	2× Platinum	100,000^{‡}
Portugal (AFP)	3× Platinum	30,000^{‡}
Spain (Promusicae)	Platinum	60,000^{‡}
United Kingdom (BPI)	2× Platinum	1,200,000^{‡}
United States (RIAA)	3× Platinum	3,000,000^{‡}
Streaming
Greece (IFPI Greece)	Platinum	2,000,000^{†}
Sweden (GLF)	Platinum	8,000,000^{†}
^{‡} Sales+streaming figures based on certification alone.^{†} Streaming-only figures based on certification alone.

== Release history ==
Release dates and formats for "Woman"
Region	Date	Format(s)	Label(s)	Ref.
Italy	October 1, 2021	Radio airplay	Sony	
United States	December 14, 2021	Contemporary hit radio; rhythmic radio	Kemosabe; RCA	
