= You Right =

2021 single by Doja Cat and the Weeknd

Single by Doja Cat and the Weeknd

from the album Planet Her
- Released: June 25, 2021
- Genre: R&B
- Length: 3:06 (standard version); 4:08 (extended version)
- Label: Kemosabe; RCA
- Songwriters: Amala Dlamini; Abel Tesfaye; Lukasz Gottwald
- Producer: Dr. Luke

Doja Cat singles chronology
"Dick" (2021)	"You Right" (2021)	"Need to Know" (2021)

The Weeknd singles chronology
"Save Your Tears" (remix) (2021)	"You Right" (2021)	"Better Believe" (2021)

Music video
- "You Right" on YouTube

"You Right" is a song by American rapper and singer Doja Cat and Canadian singer-songwriter the Weeknd, from Doja Cat's third studio album, Planet Her. It was released through Kemosabe and RCA Records on June 25, 2021, as the second single of the album, which was released on the same day. The song officially impacted American contemporary hit radio and rhythmic contemporary radio on June 29. The track received acclaim from music critics. Commercially, the song reached the top 15 in eleven countries and reached number 12 on the Billboard Global 200 chart.

== Background and recording ==
Doja Cat had expressed her desire for the Weeknd to feature on her third studio album, Planet Her, during the recording process, initially having showed him one song that she herself thought was "the perfect song." According to Doja Cat, that song "ended up not working," however after playing him the original solo version of "You Right," which was already complete with two verses, he became "obsessed" with it and they replaced one of those solo verses with his own. An extended version of the song featuring Doja Cat's original second verse appeared as the fifteenth track on the deluxe edition of Planet Her, which was released on June 26.

"...he was obsessed with it and that's kind of all I wanted was a very good reaction [...] It's a beautiful, beautiful song."

— Doja Cat on recording "You Right" with the Weeknd.

The song's existence and its status as the "steamy second single" was announced on April 22, 2021, in a Billboard cover story interview with Doja Cat, in which the Weeknd had contributed the statement: "Doja is a star, and has created a unique universe you just want to lose yourself in. She's got such drive and vast creative vision that we will be seeing her impact for a very long time to come." During a red carpet interview at the 2021 Billboard Music Awards in late May, Doja Cat once again confirmed that "You Right" would be the second single from Planet Her following "Kiss Me More." The song marks the second collaboration between Doja Cat and the Weeknd, following the remix of the Weeknd's 2020 single "In Your Eyes."

== Critical reception ==
Vulture, during its review of Planet Her, described "You Right" as a song that serves to channel the feelings of self-pity. Fred Thomas of AllMusic found the song to be "slick cosmic R&B." Writing for Entertainment Weekly, Leah Greenblatt called "You Right" a "slow-rolling infidelity anthem," featuring the "dark-lord 3 a.m. energy" of the Weeknd. In an NME article, Nick Levine called the song a "dreamy duet" between Doja Cat and the Weeknd, but noted the presence of Dr. Luke as a producer, who "became a music industry pariah in 2014 after being accused of emotional abuse and sexual assault by Kesha," calling it "telling" that he was now credited as "Dr. Luke" instead of the pseudonym "Tyson Trax" used on "Say So." Safy-Hallan Farah of Pitchfork wrote that the "longing and yearning" of Doja Cat's pre-chorus "segues effortlessly into a resigned hook."

== Accolades ==
Awards and nominations for "You Right"
Year	Organization	Award	Result	Ref(s)
2021	MTV Video Music Awards	Best Visual Effects	Nominated	

== Music video ==
The music video was filmed in June 2021, directed by Quentin Deronzier. The music video for "You Right" was released on the day before the single. Doja Cat appeared on an episode of YouTube Originals' Released series leading up to the release. In the music video, Doja Cat is in a Greek goddess-like kingdom amongst the clouds. She sings about her temptations to cheat on her boyfriend (played by model Chris Petersen) with the Weeknd, who tries to convince Doja Cat into having the affair.

The music video is heavily influenced by astrology, with Doja Cat and the Weeknd paying homage to their respective astrological signs. Doja Cat is a Libra, which is represented by the scales. In the beginning of the video, Doja Cat appears with her wig shaped as the zodiac's symbol, as she sings in the middle of a large balance scale. The Weeknd is an Aquarius, which is represented by the water bearer. When he appears in the video, he pours water from the zodiac's cup onto Doja Cat.

== Credits and personnel ==
- Doja Cat – songwriting, vocals
- The Weeknd – songwriting, vocals
- Dr. Luke – songwriting, production
- John Hanes – engineering
- Rian Lewis – engineering
- Serban Ghenea – mixing
- Mike Bozzi – mastering

== Charts ==
=== Weekly charts ===
Weekly chart performance for "You Right"
Chart (2021–2022)	Peak position
Australia (ARIA)	11
Austria (Ö3 Austria Top 40)	53
Canada Hot 100 (Billboard)	10
Canada CHR/Top 40 (Billboard)	13
Canada Hot AC (Billboard)	40
France (SNEP)	120
Germany (GfK)	54
Global 200 (Billboard)	12
Greece International (IFPI)	15
Hungary (Single Top 40)	24
India International Singles (IMI)	12
Ireland (IRMA)	11
Lebanon (OLT20)	7
Lithuania (AGATA)	15
Malaysia (RIM)	20
Mexico (Billboard Mexican Airplay)	45
Netherlands (Single Top 100)	59
New Zealand (Recorded Music NZ)	6
Norway (VG-lista)	30
Portugal (AFP)	26
Singapore (RIAS)	12
Slovakia (Singles Digitál Top 100)	47
South Africa (RISA)	5
Sweden (Sverigetopplistan)	53
Switzerland (Schweizer Hitparade)	38
UK Singles (Official Charts)	9
US Billboard Hot 100	11
US Adult Contemporary (Billboard)	24
US Adult Pop Airplay (Billboard)	12
US Dance Airplay (Billboard)	12
US Hot R&B/Hip-Hop Songs (Billboard)	2
US Pop Airplay (Billboard)	5
US R&B/Hip-Hop Airplay (Billboard)	28
US Rhythmic Airplay (Billboard)	1

=== Year-end charts ===
2021 year-end chart performance for "You Right"
Chart (2021)	Position
Canada (Canadian Hot 100)	56
Global 200 (Billboard)	135
US Billboard Hot 100	43
US Hot R&B/Hip-Hop Songs (Billboard)	17
US Mainstream Top 40 (Billboard)	24
US Rhythmic (Billboard)	12

2022 year-end chart performance for "You Right"
Chart (2022)	Position
Global 200 (Billboard)	140
US Billboard Hot 100	45
US Adult Top 40 (Billboard)	44
US Hot R&B/Hip-Hop Songs (Billboard)	36

== Certifications ==
Certifications for "You Right"
Region	Certification	Certified units/sales
Australia (ARIA)	2× Platinum	140,000^{‡}
Brazil (Pro-Música Brasil)	2× Diamond	320,000^{‡}
Canada (Music Canada)	5× Platinum	400,000^{‡}
Denmark (IFPI Danmark)	Gold	45,000^{‡}
France (SNEP)	Gold	100,000^{‡}
Italy (FIMI)	Gold	50,000^{‡}
Mexico (AMPROFON)	2× Platinum	280,000^{‡}
New Zealand (RMNZ)	2× Platinum	60,000^{‡}
Norway (IFPI Norway)	Gold	30,000^{‡}
Poland (ZPAV)	Platinum	50,000^{‡}
Portugal (AFP)	Gold	5,000^{‡}
Spain (Promusicae)	Gold	30,000^{‡}
United Kingdom (BPI)	Platinum	600,000^{‡}
United States (RIAA)	2× Platinum	2,000,000^{‡}
Streaming
Greece (IFPI Greece)	Gold	1,000,000^{†}
Sweden (GLF)	Gold	4,000,000^{†}
^{‡} Sales+streaming figures based on certification alone.^{†} Streaming-only figures based on certification alone.

== Release history ==
Release dates and formats for "You Right"
Region	Date	Format(s)	Label(s)	Ref.
Various	June 24, 2021	Streaming	Kemosabe; RCA	
United States	June 29, 2021	Contemporary hit radio; rhythmic contemporary radio	Kemosabe; RCA	
United States	July 13, 2021	Urban contemporary radio	Kemosabe; RCA	
United States	November 8, 2021	Adult contemporary radio; hot adult contemporary radio; modern adult contemporary radio	Kemosabe; RCA	
