= Get Into It (Yuh) =

2021 song by Doja Cat

Single by Doja Cat

from the album Planet Her
- Released: March 11, 2022
- Recorded: May 2021
- Studio: The Sound Factory (Los Angeles, California)
- Genre: Hip hop
- Length: 2:19
- Label: Kemosabe; RCA
- Songwriters: Doja Cat; Ari Starace; Sheldon Cheung
- Producers: Y2K; Sully

Doja Cat singles chronology
"Freaky Deaky" (2022)	"Get Into It (Yuh)" (2022)	"Vegas" (2022)

Music video
- "Get Into It (Yuh)" on YouTube

"Get Into It (Yuh)" is a song by American rapper and singer Doja Cat from her third studio album Planet Her (2021). Doja co-wrote the track with its producers, Y2K and Sully. It was released through Kemosabe and RCA Records alongside the parent album as an album track. Following the album's release, it entered various international music charts due to going viral on the video-sharing app TikTok. Following premiere of the music video on January 31, 2022, the song was released to radio as the album's fifth and final single on March 11, 2022.

== Composition and lyrics ==
A "squeaky swag" rap song featuring "glitchy", "twinkling" and "quirky" production influenced by dancehall and bubblegum, "Get into It (Yuh)" is a tribute to rapper Nicki Minaj, whom Doja Cat thanks directly for "paving the way for her polished pop-rap career" by saying "Thank you Nicki, I love you!" towards the end of the song. Throughout the song she borrows the unique rapid-fire flow Minaj commonly used in her early career and even interpolates the lyric "Got that big rocket launcher" from her 2010 debut single "Massive Attack". Shortly after the release of the song, Minaj revealed in a fan's Twitter Space conversation that Doja Cat had originally asked her to feature on the song, but Minaj passed on the collaboration due to thinking she could not bring anything unique and improve the song. She had asked Doja's team to send her another song, but they never did.

== Critical reception ==
"Get Into It (Yuh)" received acclaim upon release, reviewers often comparing it to Nicki Minaj's work and Playboi Carti. Consequence described the track as "swaggering", while Clash dubbed it "playful". DIY cites the track as a "vibe-heavy" highlight, complimenting Doja Cat's "fiery rapping style". Sputnikmusic was less positive, dubbing the song's production as an "excuse for grating repetitiousness".

English singer Charli XCX named "Get Into It (Yuh)" the song of the year that "absolutely no one [would] top ... in 2021".

=== Accolades ===
Critical rankings for "Get Into It (Yuh)"
Publication	Accolade	Rank	Ref.
Entertainment Weekly	The 10 Best Songs of 2021	10	
The Tab	Best Songs of 2021	17	
Pitchfork	The 100 Best Songs of 2021	94	
Pitchfork	38 Best Rap Songs of 2021	Placed	

== Commercial performance ==
"Get Into It (Yuh)" debuted on the US Billboard Hot 100 at number 93 in the week of July 10, 2021. A dance—choreographed by David Vu on TikTok, uploaded in late July—fueled a boost in streaming, causing the track to re-enter the chart at 75 roughly two months later on the week of August 28, 2021. Following its release to US radio as a single, the song reached a new peak of number 20 in July 2022. In addition to its success in the United States, the track has also reached the top 40 in Canada, Australia, and New Zealand.

== Music video ==
The music video was filmed in October 2021, directed by Mike Diva. The video features Dane DiLiegro as the Alien overlord. In November 2021, Marketing Dive and PR Newswire reported that a music video for the song was under production in association with Lifewtr. An accompanying trailer for the music video was released on January 28, 2022. The video was later released to YouTube on January 31, 2022.

== Charts ==
=== Weekly charts ===
Weekly chart performance for "Get Into It (Yuh)"
Chart (2021–2022)	Peak position
Australia (ARIA)	30
Canada Hot 100 (Billboard)	39
Canada CHR/Top 40 (Billboard)	27
France (SNEP)	190
Global 200 (Billboard)	41
Greece International (IFPI)	33
Ireland (IRMA)	34
Lithuania (AGATA)	68
New Zealand (Recorded Music NZ)	18
Portugal (AFP)	82
South Africa (TOSAC)	32
Sweden Heatseeker (Sverigetopplistan)	19
UK Singles (Official Charts)	41
US Billboard Hot 100	20
US Adult Pop Airplay (Billboard)	39
US Dance Airplay (Billboard)	10
US Hot R&B/Hip-Hop Songs (Billboard)	7
US Pop Airplay (Billboard)	4
US Rhythmic Airplay (Billboard)	2

=== Year-end charts ===
2021 year-end chart performance for "Get Into It (Yuh)"
Chart (2021)	Position
US Hot R&B/Hip-Hop Songs (Billboard)	85

2022 year-end chart performance for "Get Into It (Yuh)"
Chart (2022)	Position
Global 200 (Billboard)	200
US Billboard Hot 100	68
US Hot R&B/Hip-Hop Songs (Billboard)	43
US Mainstream Top 40 (Billboard)	24
US Rhythmic (Billboard)	10

== Certifications ==
Certifications for "Get into It (Yuh)"
Region	Certification	Certified units/sales
Australia (ARIA)	2× Platinum	140,000^{‡}
Brazil (Pro-Música Brasil)	Diamond	160,000^{‡}
Canada (Music Canada)	3× Platinum	240,000^{‡}
France (SNEP)	Gold	100,000^{‡}
New Zealand (RMNZ)	2× Platinum	60,000^{‡}
Poland (ZPAV)	Gold	25,000^{‡}
United Kingdom (BPI)	Gold	400,000^{‡}
United States (RIAA)	2× Platinum	2,000,000^{‡}
^{‡} Sales+streaming figures based on certification alone.

== Release history ==
Release dates and formats for "Get Into It (Yuh)"
Region	Date	Format	Label(s)	Ref.
Italy	March 11, 2022	Radio airplay	Sony	
United States	March 29, 2022	Rhythmic contemporary radio	Kemosabe; RCA	
United States	April 5, 2022	Contemporary hit radio	Kemosabe; RCA	
