= Vegas (Doja Cat song) =

2022 single by Doja Cat

Single by Doja Cat

from the album Elvis: Original Motion Picture Soundtrack
- Released: May 6, 2022
- Genre: Hip hop
- Length: 3:02
- Label: Kemosabe; RCA
- Songwriters: Amala Dlamini; Rogét Chahayed; David Sprecher; Jerry Leiber; Mike Stoller
- Producers: Chahayed; Yeti Beats

Doja Cat singles chronology
| "Get Into It (Yuh)" (2022) | "Vegas" (2022) | "I Like You (A Happier Song)" (2022) |

Music video
- "Vegas" on YouTube

"Vegas" is a song by American rapper and singer Doja Cat. It was released through Kemosabe Records and RCA Records as the lead single from the soundtrack for Baz Luhrmann's Elvis Presley biopic, Elvis, on May 6, 2022. The official music video for the song was released on June 2, 2022. It became Doja Cat's seventh top-ten single on the US Billboard Hot 100 and received a nomination at the 65th Annual Grammy Awards for Best Rap Performance and a nomination at 2023 MTV Movie & TV Awards for Best Song.

== Composition ==
The song's lyrics refer to a man who was an "underwhelming lover" whom Doja Cat feels "never deserved her attention". Produced by Rogét Chahayed and Yeti Beats, it samples Shonka Dukureh's recording of the song "Hound Dog", which was written by Jerry Leiber and Mike Stoller, first recorded by Big Mama Thornton (who Dukureh plays in the film) in 1952 and notably covered by Presley.

== Critical reception ==
Writing for Consequence, Carys Anderson felt that Doja Cat "lives up to the challenge" of Luhrmann "pairing historical content with modern music", calling it "Ain't Shit" meets "Hound Dog". Wongo Okon of Uproxx remarked that Doja "raps with a vengeance".

== Commercial performance ==
"Vegas" peaked at number ten on the US Billboard Hot 100, becoming Doja's seventh top-ten single. The song also reached number one on the Pop Songs chart, making it the first solo soundtrack song to reach the top of that chart since Justin Timberlake's "Can't Stop the Feeling!" in 2016. It also makes her the artist with the most number ones on Pop Songs this decade among women.

== Live performances ==
Prior to its official release, Doja Cat performed "Vegas" for the first time during the 2022 Coachella Valley Music and Arts Festival. She was joined by Shonka Dukureh, who performed the sample she provided for the song.

== Music video ==
The music video was released on June 2, 2022. It is directed by child., and features a cameo by Dukureh, who portrays Big Mama Thornton in Elvis.

== Charts ==
=== Weekly charts ===
Weekly chart performance
| Chart (2022–2023) | Peak position |
|---|---|
| Australia (ARIA) | 4 |
| Canada Hot 100 (Billboard) | 14 |
| Canada CHR/Top 40 (Billboard) | 2 |
| Canada Hot AC (Billboard) | 30 |
| CIS Airplay (TopHit) | 138 |
| Global 200 (Billboard) | 28 |
| Greece International (IFPI) | 22 |
| Hungary (Single Top 40) | 19 |
| Iceland (Tónlistinn) | 18 |
| Ireland (IRMA) | 15 |
| Japan Hot Overseas (Billboard Japan) | 8 |
| Lithuania (AGATA) | 15 |
| Netherlands (Single Tip) | 19 |
| New Zealand (Recorded Music NZ) | 3 |
| Portugal (AFP) | 100 |
| Romania (UPFR) | 10 |
| Romania Airplay (Media Forest) | 4 |
| Romania TV Airplay (Media Forest) | 3 |
| South Africa Streaming (TOSAC) | 18 |
| Switzerland (Schweizer Hitparade) | 93 |
| Turkey (Radiomonitor Türkiye) | 9 |
| UK Singles (Official Charts) | 24 |
| US Billboard Hot 100 | 10 |
| US Adult Pop Airplay (Billboard) | 23 |
| US Dance Airplay (Billboard) | 10 |
| US Hot Rap Songs (Billboard) | 2 |
| US Pop Airplay (Billboard) | 1 |
| US Rhythmic Airplay (Billboard) | 1 |

=== Year-end charts ===
Year-end chart performance
| Chart (2022) | Position |
|---|---|
| Australia (ARIA) | 33 |
| Canada (Canadian Hot 100) | 38 |
| Global 200 (Billboard) | 128 |
| New Zealand (Recorded Music NZ) | 32 |
| US Billboard Hot 100 | 47 |
| US Hot Rap Songs (Billboard) | 7 |
| US Mainstream Top 40 (Billboard) | 22 |
| US Rhythmic (Billboard) | 44 |

| Chart (2023) | Position |
|---|---|
| US Hot Rap Songs (Billboard) | 15 |
| US Mainstream Top 40 (Billboard) | 31 |
| US Radio Songs (Billboard) | 64 |

== Certifications ==
Certifications for "Vegas"
| Region | Certification | Certified units/sales |
|---|---|---|
| Australia (ARIA) | 2× Platinum | 140,000^{‡} |
| Austria (IFPI Austria) | Gold | 15,000^{‡} |
| Brazil (Pro-Música Brasil) | Diamond | 160,000^{‡} |
| Canada (Music Canada) | 2× Platinum | 160,000^{‡} |
| Denmark (IFPI Danmark) | Gold | 45,000^{‡} |
| France (SNEP) | Gold | 100,000^{‡} |
| New Zealand (RMNZ) | 2× Platinum | 60,000^{‡} |
| Poland (ZPAV) | Gold | 25,000^{‡} |
| United Kingdom (BPI) | Gold | 400,000^{‡} |
| United States (RIAA) | 3× Platinum | 3,000,000^{‡} |
^{‡} Sales+streaming figures based on certification alone.

== Release history ==
Release history and formats for "Vegas"
| Region | Date | Format(s) | Label(s) | Ref. |
|---|---|---|---|---|
| Various | May 6, 2022 | Digital download; streaming | Kemosabe; RCA | |
| Italy | May 13, 2022 | Radio airplay | Sony | |
| United States | July 12, 2022 | Contemporary hit radio | Kemosabe; RCA | |
| United States | August 16, 2022 | Rhythmic contemporary | Kemosabe; RCA | |
