= MTV Video Music Award for Song of the Year =

Annual music video award

- "Swim" by BTS is the most recent recipient.
- Country: United States
- Presented by: MTV
- First award: 2018
- Currently held by: BTS – "Swim" (2026)

Highlights
- Most nominations: Bruno Mars (4)
- Website: VMA website

The MTV Video Music Award for Song of the Year is given at the annual MTV Video Music Awards. It was first introduced at the 2018 MTV Video Music Awards.

Post Malone and 21 Savage were the first recipients of the award in 2018. Bruno Mars has the most nominations in the category with four.

== Recipients ==
† Marks Winners of the MTV Video Music Award for Video of the Year

*Marks Nominees of the MTV Video Music Award for Video of the Year

=== 2010s ===
Recipients
| Year (Note: Each year is linked to the article about the MTV Video Music Awards held that year.) | Winner(s) | Video | Nominees | Ref. |
|---|---|---|---|---|
| 2018 | Post Malone (featuring 21 Savage) | "Rockstar" | Camila Cabello (featuring Young Thug) – "Havana"†; Drake – "God's Plan"*; Dua Lipa – "New Rules"; Bruno Mars (featuring Cardi B) – "Finesse (Remix)"*; Ed Sheeran – "Perfect" | |
| 2019 | Lil Nas X (featuring Billy Ray Cyrus)* | "Old Town Road (Remix)"* | Drake – "In My Feelings"; Ariana Grande — "Thank U, Next"*; Jonas Brothers — "Sucker"*; Lady Gaga and Bradley Cooper – "Shallow"; Taylor Swift — "You Need to Calm Down"† | |

=== 2020s ===
Recipients
| Year | Winner(s) | Video | Nominees | Ref. |
|---|---|---|---|---|
| 2020 | Lady Gaga with Ariana Grande* | "Rain on Me"* | Doja Cat – "Say So"; Billie Eilish – "Everything I Wanted"*; Megan Thee Stallion – "Savage"; Post Malone – "Circles"; Roddy Ricch – "The Box" | |
| 2021 | Olivia Rodrigo | "Drivers License" | 24kGoldn (featuring Iann Dior) – "Mood"; BTS – "Dynamite"; Cardi B (featuring Megan Thee Stallion) – "WAP"*; Dua Lipa – "Levitating"; Bruno Mars, Anderson .Paak, and Silk Sonic – "Leave the Door Open" | |
| 2022 | Billie Eilish | "Happier Than Ever" | Adele – "Easy on Me"; Doja Cat – "Woman"*; Elton John and Dua Lipa – "Cold Heart (Pnau remix)"; The Kid Laroi and Justin Bieber – "Stay"; Lizzo – "About Damn Time" | |
| 2023 | Taylor Swift | "Anti-Hero"† | Miley Cyrus – "Flowers"*; Steve Lacy – "Bad Habit"; Rema and Selena Gomez – "Calm Down"; Olivia Rodrigo – "Vampire"*; Sam Smith and Kim Petras – "Unholy"*; SZA – "Kill Bill"* | |
| 2024 | Sabrina Carpenter | "Espresso" | Beyoncé – "Texas Hold 'Em"; Jack Harlow – "Lovin on Me"; Kendrick Lamar – "Not Like Us"; Taylor Swift (featuring Post Malone) – "Fortnight"†; Teddy Swims – "Lose Control" | |
| 2025 | Rosé and Bruno Mars | "APT."* | Alex Warren – "Ordinary"; Billie Eilish – "Birds of a Feather"*; Doechii – "Anxiety"; Ed Sheeran – "Sapphire"; Gracie Abrams – "I Love You, I’m Sorry"; Lady Gaga and Bruno Mars – "Die with a Smile"*; Lorde – "What Was That"; Tate McRae – "Sports Car"; The Weeknd and Playboi Carti – "Timeless"* | |
| 2026 | BTS | "Swim" | Ella Langley – "Choosin' Texas"; Huntrix: Ejae, Audrey Nuna, Rei Ami – "Golden"; Madonna & Sabrina Carpenter – "Bring Your Love"; Olivia Dean – "Man I Need"; PinkPantheress and Zara Larsson – "Stateside"; Raye – "Where Is My Husband!" | |

== Artists with multiple nominations ==
4 nominations

- Bruno Mars

3 nominations

- Dua Lipa
- Post Malone
- Taylor Swift
- Billie Eilish
- Lady Gaga

2 nominations

- Ariana Grande
- Cardi B
- Doja Cat
- Drake
- Megan Thee Stallion
- Olivia Rodrigo
- Sabrina Carpenter
- BTS
