= Need to Know (Doja Cat song) =

2021 single by Doja Cat

Single by Doja Cat

from the album Planet Her
- Released: August 31, 2021
- Genre: Trap
- Length: 3:30
- Label: Kemosabe; RCA
- Songwriters: Amala Dlamini; Lukasz Gottwald
- Producer: Dr. Luke

Doja Cat singles chronology
| "You Right" (2021) | "Need to Know" (2021) | "Woman" (2021) |

Music video
- "Need to Know" on YouTube

"Need to Know" is a song by American rapper and singer Doja Cat, from her third studio album, Planet Her (2021). Written by Doja Cat and producer Dr. Luke, the song was initially released through Kemosabe and RCA Records on June 11, 2021, as the sole promotional single from the album, and impacted American rhythmic contemporary radio stations on August 31, as the third single. A melodic trap song characterized by raunchy lyrics and atmospheric instrumentation, it received critical acclaim for Doja Cat's versatility in her vocal delivery.

"Need to Know" was nominated for Best Melodic Rap Performance at the 64th Annual Grammy Awards. Commercially, the song reached the top 10 in eight countries, including the United States and Australia, where it has been awarded quadruple platinum certifications from both the Recording Industry Association of America (RIAA) and Australian Recording Industry Association (ARIA). The accompanying music video explores the futuristic environment of the fictional "Planet Her" and features cameo appearances from Grimes and Ryan Destiny.

== Background and release ==
In April 2021, the song was confirmed after being mentioned during a cover story interview with Billboard. On June 9, 2021, Doja Cat officially announced the release of "Need to Know" via a futuristic teaser on her Instagram, with the faint melody of the song briefly heard in the short clip. Shortly after the teaser was published, Doja Cat noted in a tweet that the song "isn't even the next single" and it was "just some shit before the next more important single comes out for you to enjoy". The song was officially released to streaming platforms at midnight local time on June 11, 2021. Shortly before the song's release, Doja Cat had officially announced the release of the parent album Planet Her, and revealed its track listing and album art. In August 2021, she performed the song in a pre-recorded video for Vevo. "Need to Know" impacted rhythmic contemporary radio in the United States, as the album's third single on August 31, 2021.

== Composition and lyrics ==
"Need to Know" is a trap song with elements of bass-heavy R&B, and disco. Written by Doja Cat and its producer Dr. Luke, the song was described as a "grinding sex jam", driven by a "crisp" rhythm of "trap snares", and "sharp" drums, over "a hard-knocking bass" and atmospheric, "neon-lit", futuristic synthesizers. Doja Cat delivers her "usual blend of ethereal vocals and melodically harsh raps", as well as "shrill" background vocals. Lyrically, she explores her pursuit of a new love interest or sexual partner whilst trying to determine if they have mutual agreement and understanding. A celebration of sexuality, Doja Cat fantasizes about her sexual desires. In the song, she makes a reference to the Pokémon species Alakazam, by equating her ability to trigger her partner's bodily reflexes to telekinesis.

"Need to Know"
A trap-pop song, the instrumentation of "Need to Know" is characterized by "atmospheric" synthesizers, a "hard-knocking" bassline and "sharp" drums, paired with "ethereal" singing and "melodically harsh" rapping.

She recalled to have been inebriated while writing the song in studio.

The song was considered distinguishable by its "raunchy" lyrics in which the rapper describes her "bedroom antics". Some critics described the track as "seductive" and "fiery", noting that Doja Cat "turns up the heat" and "takes it to the bedroom". Paris Close of iHeartRadio commented that she delivers "a salvo of erotic verses nonstop, only stopping to catch her breath in soft, sensual whispers and climactic coos". Jon Blistein of Rolling Stone noted that Doja Cat's rap verses "lean into delightfully lurid punchlines". Imogen Lawlor of Vinyl Chapters wrote that her "triplet flow is layered over... disco production, segueing seamlessly into a[n]... electronic UFO melody".

== Reception ==
"Need to Know" was released to widespread critical acclaim. Vulture crowned "Need to Know" as the best song of 2021 and deemed it "the best showcase of all the talents [Doja Cat]'s possessed for years", praising her "vocal contortionism" and "overflowing charisma". In an album review for Uproxx, Bianca Gracie crowned "Need to Know" as the best song on Planet Her and described it as "an otherworldly joyride driven by the mad scientist that is Doja Cat", whom she proclaimed was "in true alien form" as she simultaneously channeled "a raunchy freak, cooing baby, helium sucker, and frantic spitter over a galaxy of ice-cold trap melodies." Meaghan Garvey of Billboard said that the song celebrates Doja Cat's femininity and revels in her sense of humor. Writing for the same magazine, Jason Lipshutz noted that "Need to Know" is "rife with thinly veiled innuendos and sexual demands" and it "features one of Doja Cat's most liberated vocal performances -- singing, rapping, pleading, crooning, remaining singular in her delivery and utterly fearless on the microphone". In Billboard's review of the album, Billboard staff deemed the song "a prime example of how Doja doesn’t solely rely on the shock value of her lyrics to make her songs click; the theatricality of her delivery and vocal performances are what truly carry this song and the rest of Planet Her.".

In 2021, "Need to Know" was nominated for the MTV Video Music Award for Song of the Summer. The following year, the song received a nomination at the 64th Annual Grammy Awards for Best Melodic Rap Performance.

== Commercial performance ==
As a promotional single, "Need to Know" debuted at number 38 on the US Billboard Hot 100, falling 28 spots to number 66 the following week. In November 2021, the song rose to the top 10 of the Hot 100 for the first time, reaching number 9 and giving Doja Cat her fourth top 10. It peaked at number eight the following week, re-peaking again at that position on the chart dated January 18, 2022. That month, the song also became Doja Cat's fourth song to top Billboard's Rhythmic radio chart in 2021, surpassing Drake as the artist with the most number ones that year. It also topped the Pop Airplay chart in February 2022. In July 2022, the song was certified triple platinum by the Recording Industry Association of America (RIAA) for amassing 3,000,000 certified units in the US.

Elsewhere, "Need to Know" peaked at number nine in the ARIA Singles Chart in Australia, where it is certified triple platinum by the Australian Recording Industry Association (ARIA). In the United Kingdom, "Need to Know" debuted at number 37 on the UK Singles Chart in its opening week, becoming her seventh top 40 hit. The song peaked at number 11 and had sold over 278,618 units in the country by October 2021, and later earned a platinum certification in the country from the British Phonographic Industry (BPI) in November 2022.

== Music video ==
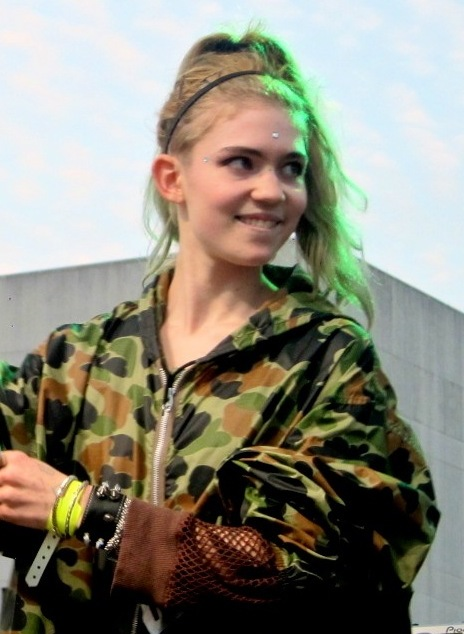
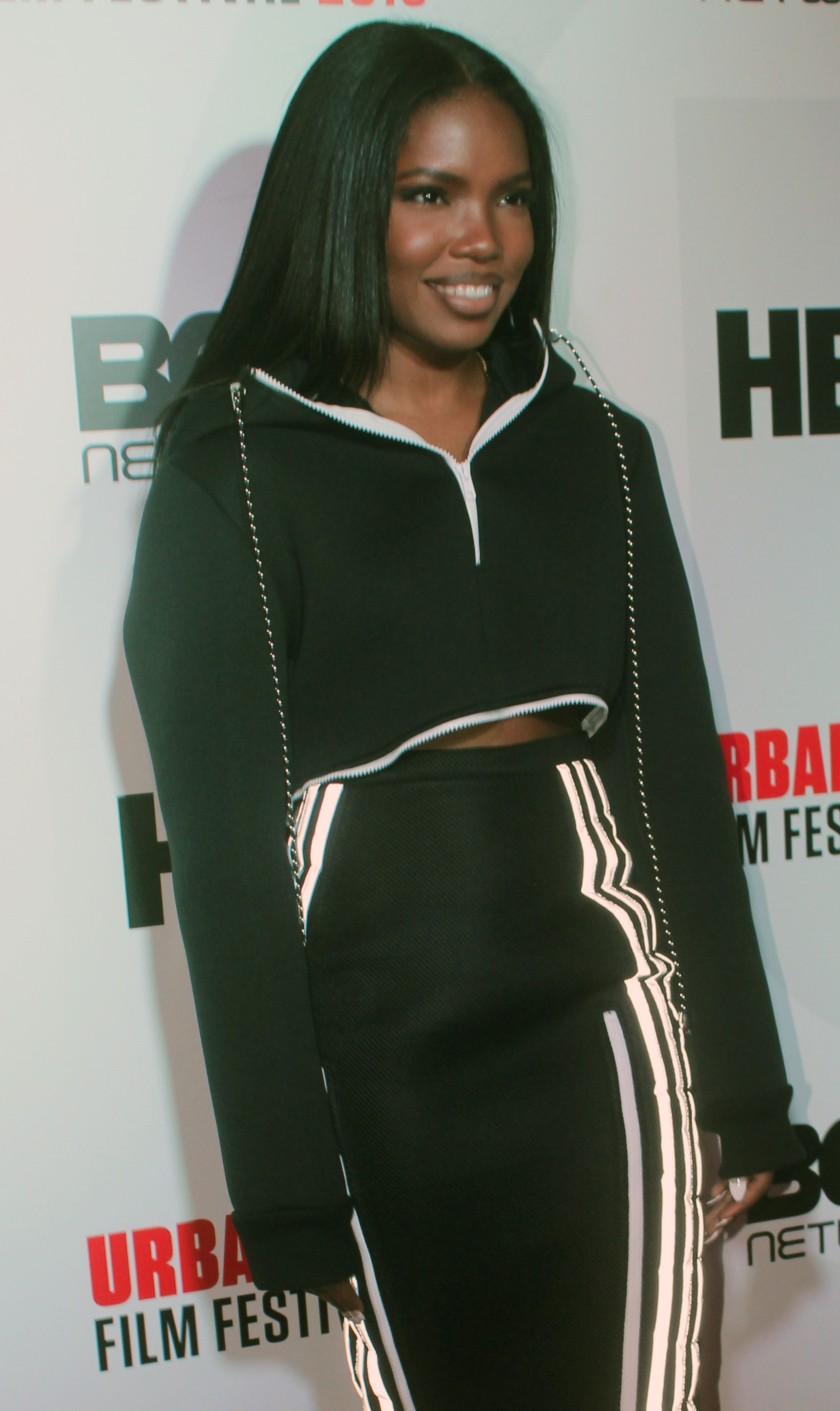
Grimes (left) and Ryan Destiny (right) both make cameo appearances in the music video.

Having been teased in the prior social media announcement, the accompanying music video was uploaded to YouTube soon after the song was released on streaming platforms at midnight local time on June 11, 2021. It was recorded over the course of a day and was directed by duo Miles Cable & AJ Favicchio with support from their production company SixTwentySix Productions. The video takes place in the futuristic city environment of the fictional "Planet Her", and follows a blue-tinted alien Doja Cat alongside a group of female alien friends played by actresses Jazelle Straka-Braxton and Josephine Pearl Leewhich, with cameo appearances from Canadian musician Grimes and American actress Ryan Destiny. Ana Diaz of Polygon compared Doja Cat's alien persona to Aayla Secura from the Star Wars franchise.

The video opens with the camera flying through a 3D-animated, futuristic cityscape, before settling on a scenic shot of Doja Cat playing video games on a PlayStation 5 in her underwear while drinking and lounging around with her group of friends in a 1970s-inspired apartment. The scene then changes to the group inside a flying "self-driving convertible pod" Uber. They arrive at a private, underground club hosting a variety of cyborgs and aliens, where the group dances and take shots of smoky vapor-like alcohol. Doja Cat begins to flirt with a man (played by Cameron Saffle) whom she shares a dance with before giving him a lap dance in a private room. While later parting ways outside the club at the end of the video, she whispers something into his ear which makes his eyes light up. Heran Mamo from Billboard posed the question, "Is he an alien? Or is he human?", to which Doja Cat indirectly responded on Twitter that he was a cyborg pretending to be human.

Miles & AJ revealed that Doja Cat and her team came up with the concept for the video and maintained creative control. Referring to Grimes, The A.V. Club noted that "given the futuristic nature of the music video, it only makes sense to bring in an artist who seems like they're from another planet". Grimes revealed that she agreed to take part in the video without even asking what it was beforehand, writing that the shoot was "insanely fun". Doja Cat and her directors used Blade Runner (1982) and The Fifth Element (1997) as reference points while creating the music video. The set for the music video was built by production designer Jonathan Chu, as opposed to the conventional usage of a green screen. Doja Cat's creative team hired Melissa Stearn as part of a team of approximately twenty artists to handle prosthetics for the video, while the animators led by visual effects artist Daichi Sakane used Unreal Engine 4.26 to render the cityscape sequences. The art direction team for the practical scenes was led by John Richoux, with assistance from production designer Jonathan Chu.

== Charts ==
=== Weekly charts ===
Weekly chart performance for "Need to Know"
| Chart (2021–2022) | Peak position |
|---|---|
| Australia (ARIA) | 9 |
| Austria (Ö3 Austria Top 40) | 37 |
| Canada Hot 100 (Billboard) | 16 |
| Canada CHR/Top 40 (Billboard) | 23 |
| Czech Republic Singles Digital (ČNS IFPI) | 25 |
| Denmark (Tracklisten) | 14 |
| Dominican Republic (SODINPRO) | 50 |
| Finland (Suomen virallinen lista) | 19 |
| France (SNEP) | 73 |
| Germany (GfK) | 53 |
| Global 200 (Billboard) | 6 |
| Greece International (IFPI) | 8 |
| Hungary (Stream Top 40) | 22 |
| Iceland (Tónlistinn) | 16 |
| India International Singles (IMI) | 6 |
| Ireland (IRMA) | 8 |
| Italy (FIMI) | 73 |
| Lithuania (AGATA) | 12 |
| Malaysia (RIM) | 9 |
| Netherlands (Single Top 100) | 53 |
| New Zealand (Recorded Music NZ) | 5 |
| Norway (VG-lista) | 14 |
| Panama (PRODUCE) | 30 |
| Peru (UNIMPRO) | 51 |
| Portugal (AFP) | 13 |
| Singapore (RIAS) | 8 |
| Slovakia (Singles Digitál Top 100) | 14 |
| South Africa (TOSAC) | 11 |
| Sweden (Sverigetopplistan) | 44 |
| Switzerland (Schweizer Hitparade) | 29 |
| UK Singles (Official Charts) | 11 |
| UK Hip Hop/R&B (Official Charts) | 3 |
| US Billboard Hot 100 | 8 |
| US Adult Pop Airplay (Billboard) | 33 |
| US Dance Airplay (Billboard) | 12 |
| US Pop Airplay (Billboard) | 1 |
| US R&B/Hip-Hop Airplay (Billboard) | 40 |
| US Rhythmic Airplay (Billboard) | 1 |

=== Year-end charts ===
2021 year-end chart performance for "Need to Know"
| Chart (2021) | Position |
|---|---|
| Australia (ARIA) | 57 |
| Canada (Canadian Hot 100) | 54 |
| Global 200 (Billboard) | 68 |
| Hungary (Stream Top 40) | 98 |
| New Zealand (Recorded Music NZ) | 47 |
| Portugal (AFP) | 75 |
| UK Singles (OCC) | 88 |
| US Billboard Hot 100 | 46 |
| US Rhythmic (Billboard) | 48 |

2022 year-end chart performance for "Need to Know"
| Chart (2022) | Position |
|---|---|
| Global 200 (Billboard) | 64 |
| US Billboard Hot 100 | 18 |
| US Mainstream Top 40 (Billboard) | 8 |
| US Rhythmic (Billboard) | 4 |

== Certifications ==
Certifications for "Need to Know"
| Region | Certification | Certified units/sales |
|---|---|---|
| Australia (ARIA) | 4× Platinum | 280,000^{‡} |
| Austria (IFPI Austria) | Gold | 15,000^{‡} |
| Brazil (Pro-Música Brasil) | 3× Diamond | 480,000^{‡} |
| Canada (Music Canada) | 5× Platinum | 400,000^{‡} |
| Denmark (IFPI Danmark) | Gold | 45,000^{‡} |
| France (SNEP) | Platinum | 200,000^{‡} |
| Italy (FIMI) | Gold | 35,000^{‡} |
| Mexico (AMPROFON) | 2× Platinum+Gold | 350,000^{‡} |
| New Zealand (RMNZ) | 3× Platinum | 90,000^{‡} |
| Norway (IFPI Norway) | Gold | 30,000^{‡} |
| Poland (ZPAV) | Platinum | 50,000^{‡} |
| Portugal (AFP) | Platinum | 10,000^{‡} |
| Spain (Promusicae) | Gold | 30,000^{‡} |
| Switzerland (IFPI Switzerland) | Gold | 10,000^{‡} |
| United Kingdom (BPI) | Platinum | 600,000^{‡} |
| United States (RIAA) | 4× Platinum | 4,000,000^{‡} |
Streaming
| Greece (IFPI Greece) | Platinum | 2,000,000^{†} |
| Sweden (GLF) | Gold | 4,000,000^{†} |
^{‡} Sales+streaming figures based on certification alone.^{†} Streaming-only figures based on certification alone.

== Release history ==
Release dates and formats for "Need to Know"
| Region | Date | Format(s) | Label(s) | Ref. |
|---|---|---|---|---|
| Various | June 11, 2021 (Note: Release as a promotional single.) | Digital download; streaming | Kemosabe; RCA | |
| United States | August 31, 2021 | Rhythmic radio | Kemosabe; RCA | |
