= Ain't Shit =

- Vevo's "Official Live Performance" cover

Song by Doja Cat

from the album Planet Her
- Released: June 25, 2021
- Recorded: 2020
- Studio: The Sound Factory (Los Angeles, California)
- Genre: Hip hop; R&B
- Length: 2:54
- Label: Kemosabe; RCA
- Songwriters: Amala Zandile Dlamini; David Sprecher; Kurtis McKenzie; Rogét Chahayed; Tizhimself
- Producers: Tizhimself; Chahayed

Official live performance video
- "Ain't Shit (Live)" on YouTube

"Ain't Shit" is a song by American rapper and singer Doja Cat from her third studio album Planet Her (2021). It was released through Kemosabe and RCA Records alongside the parent album as an album track. Originally under the title "Niggas Ain't Shit" and "N.A.S.", the song was teased and anticipated months prior after being previewed by Doja Cat on an Instagram livestream in early April 2020.

The song was produced by Tizhimself and Rogét Chahayed with additional production from Yeti Beats and Kurtis McKenzie, all of whom are also credited as co-writers alongside Doja Cat. "Ain't Shit" is the only song excluded from the clean version of its parent album due to the chorus's explicit nature. Commercially, the song debuted within the top 30 of the Billboard Hot 100 as an album track.

== Background ==
In April 2020, Doja Cat played the song in its entirety while on an Instagram livestream, before the preview gained traction on the video-sharing platform TikTok. Doja Cat hinted at the release of this song under the acronymic title "N.A.S." in August 2020, yet this did not happen. Many believed that this title aimed to earn "subtle digs" at American rapper Nas, who had dissed her on his single "Ultra Black" earlier that month.

== Composition and lyrics ==
Over an R&B rhythm, Doja Cat sings angrily about "immature, unfaithful men who have wronged and hurt her". "Ain't Shit" is characterized by its refrain in which she sings the line "niggas ain't shit!" in a high, falsetto register", as well as its one-liners and "rapped eye-rolls". Throughout the song, Doja Cat "rips through biting rap verses with a venomous flow that is counterbalanced by more restrained sung verses".

== Critical reception ==
The A.V. Club and Loud and Quiet considered the song a highlight from the record. Uproxx and Consequence praised it for the humor and personality in its lyrics, while Insider wrote that it recalls what initially attracted Doja Cat's fanbase when her comedic novelty song "Mooo!" went viral in 2018. Loud and Quiet described it as a "fuck you anthem" and praised its "gratifyingly childish insults" and Doja Cat's "villainous delivery". Elly Watson of DIY praised the song's "effortless bad-bitch energy". Nick Levine of NME wrote that Doja Cat's lyrics "possess a plain-speaking power," stressing that "it's not so much what she says, but the way that she says it."

== Live performance ==
In July 2021, Doja Cat first officially performed "Ain't Shit" in a pre-recorded video for Vevo on a set with gold structures amongst a Californian desert.

== Commercial performance ==
"Ain't Shit" debuted at number 24 on the Billboard Hot 100 in the opening week of Planet Her, becoming the highest charting non-single from the record. It earned similar placements in Canada, Ireland, and the United Kingdom. The song also reached the top ten in New Zealand.

== Charts ==
=== Weekly charts ===
Weekly chart performance for "Ain't Shit"
| Chart (2021) | Peak position |
|---|---|
| Australia (ARIA) | 70 |
| Canada Hot 100 (Billboard) | 27 |
| Global 200 (Billboard) | 24 |
| Ireland (IRMA) | 22 |
| Lithuania (AGATA) | 22 |
| New Zealand (Recorded Music NZ) | 8 |
| Portugal (AFP) | 53 |
| South Africa (RISA) | 13 |
| Sweden Heatseeker (Sverigetopplistan) | 9 |
| UK Singles (Official Charts) | 29 |
| US Billboard Hot 100 | 24 |
| US Hot R&B/Hip-Hop Songs (Billboard) | 10 |

=== Year-end charts ===
Year-end chart performance for "Ain't Shit"
| Chart (2021) | Position |
|---|---|
| Global 200 (Billboard) | 158 |
| US Hot R&B/Hip-Hop Songs (Billboard) | 48 |

== Certifications ==
Certifications for "Ain't Shit"
| Region | Certification | Certified units/sales |
|---|---|---|
| Australia (ARIA) | 2× Platinum | 140,000^{‡} |
| Brazil (Pro-Música Brasil) | Diamond | 160,000^{‡} |
| Canada (Music Canada) | 3× Platinum | 240,000^{‡} |
| New Zealand (RMNZ) | 2× Platinum | 60,000^{‡} |
| Poland (ZPAV) | Gold | 25,000^{‡} |
| United Kingdom (BPI) | Gold | 400,000^{‡} |
| United States (RIAA) | 2× Platinum | 2,000,000^{‡} |
^{‡} Sales+streaming figures based on certification alone.
