= Linden Jay =

British record producer

- Born: Linden Jay Berelowitz
- Origin: London, England
- Genres: Soul, pop, R&B, electronic, hip hop
- Occupations: Record producer, songwriter
- Labels: AWAL
- Website: www.lindenjay.com

Linden Jay Berelowitz, known professionally as Linden Jay is an English electronic and pop music songwriter, record producer and musician from North London. He is best known for producing Doja Cat's single "Woman", for which Jay was nominated for a Grammy Award, and Joji's single "Like You Do".

== Career ==
Linden grew up in North London and attended Berklee College of Music studying jazz and the drums. He later signed a deal with Electric Feel publishing in 2022. Linden has been credited as a record producer and co-writer on many artists records including: Kelis, Stormzy, Sampha, Duke Dumont, The Kid Laroi, 24K Golden, Benee, James Bay, Grentperez, Duckwrth, Channel Tres, Loyle Carner, Reuben James and Flatbush Zombies. He is also in the band FARR and has his own solo project.

== Discography ==
=== Selected production and songwriting credits ===
- "Love or A Lesson" – Mary Ann Alexander (2025)
- "Heart on My Sleeve" – Chloe Bailey (2023)
- "Light of My Soul" – Bas (2023)
- "Diamonds" – Bas (2023)
- "Yao Ming" – Bas (2023)
- "My Heart It Beats For You" – Grentperez (2022)
- "Samphas Plea" – Stormzy, Sampha (2022)
- "Please" – Stormzy (2022)
- "Cherry Wine" – Grentperez (2022)
- "Woman" – Doja Cat (2021)
- "Alone" – Doja Cat (2021)
- "Clementine" – Grentperez (2021)
- "Let it Go" – Erick Arc Elliott, Loyle Carner (2020)
- "Like You Do" – Joji (2020)
- "Love Me Back" – Ritual, Tove Styrke (2019)

== Awards and nominations ==
=== 65th Annual Grammy Awards ===
| Year | Nominee / work | Award | Result | Ref. |
|---|---|---|---|---|
| 2023 | "Woman" | Record Of The Year | Nominated | |

=== BMI R&B/Hip-Hop Awards ===
| Year | Nominee / work | Award | Result |
|---|---|---|---|
| 2023 | "Woman" | Award winning song | Won |
