= Pop Airplay =

US radio airplay music chart published by Billboard magazine

Pop Airplay (formerly known as Pop Songs, Mainstream Top 40 and Top 40/Mainstream) is a 40-song music chart published weekly by Billboard magazine that ranks the most popular songs of pop music being played on a panel of Top 40 radio stations in the United States. The rankings are based on radio airplay detections as measured by Nielsen Broadcast Data Systems (Nielsen BDS), a subsidiary of the United States' leading marketing research company. Consumer researchers, Nielsen Audio (formerly Arbitron), refers to the format as contemporary hit radio (CHR). The current number-one song on the chart is "Mr. Know It All" by Teddy Swims.

== History ==
The chart debuted in Billboard magazine in its issued date October 3, 1992, with the introduction of two Top 40 airplay charts, Mainstream and Rhythm-Crossover. Both Top 40 charts measured "actual monitored airplay" from data compiled by Broadcast Data Systems (BDS). The Top 40/Mainstream chart was compiled from airplay on radio stations playing a wide variety of music, while the Top 40/Rhythm-Crossover chart was made up from airplay on stations playing more dance and R&B music. Both charts were "born of then-new BDS electronic monitoring technology" as a more objective and precise way of measuring airplay on radio stations. This data was also used as the airplay component for Hot 100 tabulations. American Top 40 with Shadoe Stevens used this chart for their show from January 1993 to January 1995.

Top 40/Mainstream was published in the print edition of Billboard from its debut in October 1992 through May 1995, when both Top 40 charts were moved exclusively to Airplay Monitor, a secondary chart publication by Billboard. They returned to the print edition in the August 2, 2003, issue. The first number-one song on the chart was "End of the Road" by Boyz II Men.

== Chart criteria ==
There are forty positions on this chart. Songs are ranked based on its total number of spins per week. This is calculated by electronically monitoring Mainstream Top 40 radio stations across the U.S. 24 hours a day, seven days a week by Nielsen Broadcast Data Systems.

Songs receiving the greatest growth receive a "bullet", although there are tracks that also get bullets if the loss in detections doesn't exceed the percentage of downtime from a monitored station. "Airpower" awards are issued to songs that appear on the top 20 of both the airplay and audience chart for the first time, while the "greatest gainer" award is given to song with the largest increase in detections. A song with six or more spins in its first week is awarded an "airplay add". If two songs are tied in spins in the same week, the one with the biggest increase that week ranks higher.

=== Recurrent rules ===
Issue Date	Criteria
October 3, 1992 – November 26, 2005	Songs below the top 20 are removed from the chart after 26 weeks.
December 3, 2005 – November 27, 2010	Songs below the top 20 are removed from the chart after 20 weeks.
December 4, 2010 – Present	Songs below the top 15 are removed from the chart after 20 weeks.

== All-time achievements ==
In 2012, for the 20th anniversary of the chart, Billboard compiled a ranking of the 100 best-performing songs on the chart over the 20 years, along with the best-performing artists. "Iris" by Goo Goo Dolls ranked as the #1 song on that list. In 2017, Billboard revised the rankings, including the methodologies for how they are calculated. "Another Night" by Real McCoy was the new #1 song, while the previous #1 song, "Iris", dropped to #8. Rihanna ranked as the top artist on both all-time charts. Shown below are the top 10 songs and the top 10 artists from the most recent chart.

=== Top 10 Pop Songs of all time (1992–2017) ===
Rank	Single	Year released	Artist(s)	Peak and duration
1.	"Another Night"	1994	Real McCoy	#1 for 6 weeks
2.	"Smooth"	1999	Santana featuring Rob Thomas	#1 for 8 weeks
3.	"Hanging by a Moment"	2000	Lifehouse	#2 for 12 weeks
4.	"Apologize"	2007	Timbaland featuring OneRepublic	#1 for 8 weeks
5.	"How You Remind Me"	2001	Nickelback	#1 for 10 weeks
6.	"Here Without You"	2003	3 Doors Down	#1 for 6 weeks
7.	"Don't Speak"	1996	No Doubt	#1 for 10 weeks
8.	"Iris"	1998	Goo Goo Dolls	#1 for 4 weeks
9.	"Closer"	2016	The Chainsmokers featuring Halsey	#1 for 11 weeks
10.	"I Love You Always Forever"	1996	Donna Lewis	#1 for 11 weeks

=== Top 10 Pop Songs artists of all time (1992–2017) ===
Rank	Artist
1.	Rihanna
2.	Pink
3.	Maroon 5
4.	Katy Perry
5.	Justin Timberlake
6.	Britney Spears
7.	Taylor Swift
8.	Kelly Clarkson
9.	Mariah Carey
10.	Bruno Mars

== Song records ==
=== Most weeks at number one ===
Number of weeks	Artist	Song	Year(s)	Source
16	Alex Warren	"Ordinary"	2025	
14	Ace of Base	"The Sign"	1994	
13	The Kid Laroi and Justin Bieber	"Stay"	2021	
12	Tame Impala and Jennie	"Dracula"	2026	
11	Mariah Carey and Boyz II Men	"One Sweet Day"	1995–96	
11	Donna Lewis	"I Love You Always Forever"	1996	
11	Natalie Imbruglia	"Torn"	1998	
11	Nelly featuring Tim McGraw	"Over and Over"	2004–05	
11	The Chainsmokers featuring Halsey	"Closer"	2016	
10	Dionne Farris	"I Know"	1995	
10	No Doubt	"Don't Speak"	1996–97	
10	Céline Dion	"My Heart Will Go On"	1998	
10	'N Sync	"Bye Bye Bye"	2000	
10	Nickelback	"How You Remind Me"	2001–02	
10	Mariah Carey	"We Belong Together"	2005	
10	Robin Thicke featuring T.I. and Pharrell	"Blurred Lines"	2013	
10	Post Malone	"Circles"	2019–20	
10	Miley Cyrus	"Flowers"	2023	
10	Taylor Swift	"Cruel Summer"	2023	

=== Most weeks in the top 10 ===
Number of weeks	Artist	Song	Year(s)	Source
45	Rema and Selena Gomez	"Calm Down"	2023–24	
45	Alex Warren	"Ordinary"	2025–26	
41	Harry Styles	"As It Was"	2022–23	
41	Benson Boone	"Beautiful Things"	2024–25	
40	The Kid Laroi and Justin Bieber	"Stay"	2021–22	
40	Hozier	"Too Sweet"	2024–25	
40	Lady Gaga and Bruno Mars	"Die with a Smile"	2024–25	
39	The Weeknd	"Blinding Lights"	2020	
36	Sabrina Carpenter	"Espresso"	2024–25	
36	Shaboozey	"A Bar Song (Tipsy)"	2024–25	
36	Billie Eilish	"Birds of a Feather"	2024–25	

=== Most weeks on the chart ===
Number of weeks	Artist	Song	Year*	Source
71	Rema and Selena Gomez	"Calm Down"	2024	
63	Harry Styles	"As It Was"	2023	
60	The Weeknd	"Blinding Lights"	2021	
60	Benson Boone	"Beautiful Things"	2025	
58	Alex Warren	"Ordinary"	2026	
54	Glass Animals	"Heat Waves"	2022	
52	Tame Impala and Jennie	"Dracula"	2026	
51	Hozier	"Too Sweet"	2025	
50	The Weeknd	"Die for You"	2023	
50	Billie Eilish	"Birds of a Feather"	2025	
50	Lady Gaga and Bruno Mars	"Die with a Smile"	2025	
50	Chappell Roan	"Pink Pony Club"	2025	

*Year when the songs ended their respective chart runs.

Prior to 2018, the song with the most weeks on the chart was "I'll Be" by Edwin McCain, which spent 41 weeks on the chart in 1998. This record run held for almost two decades, but has been surpassed many times since then. Radio stations having more data points, such as streaming, to increase their accuracy at measuring what radio listeners want to hear, have made longer runs more commonplace.

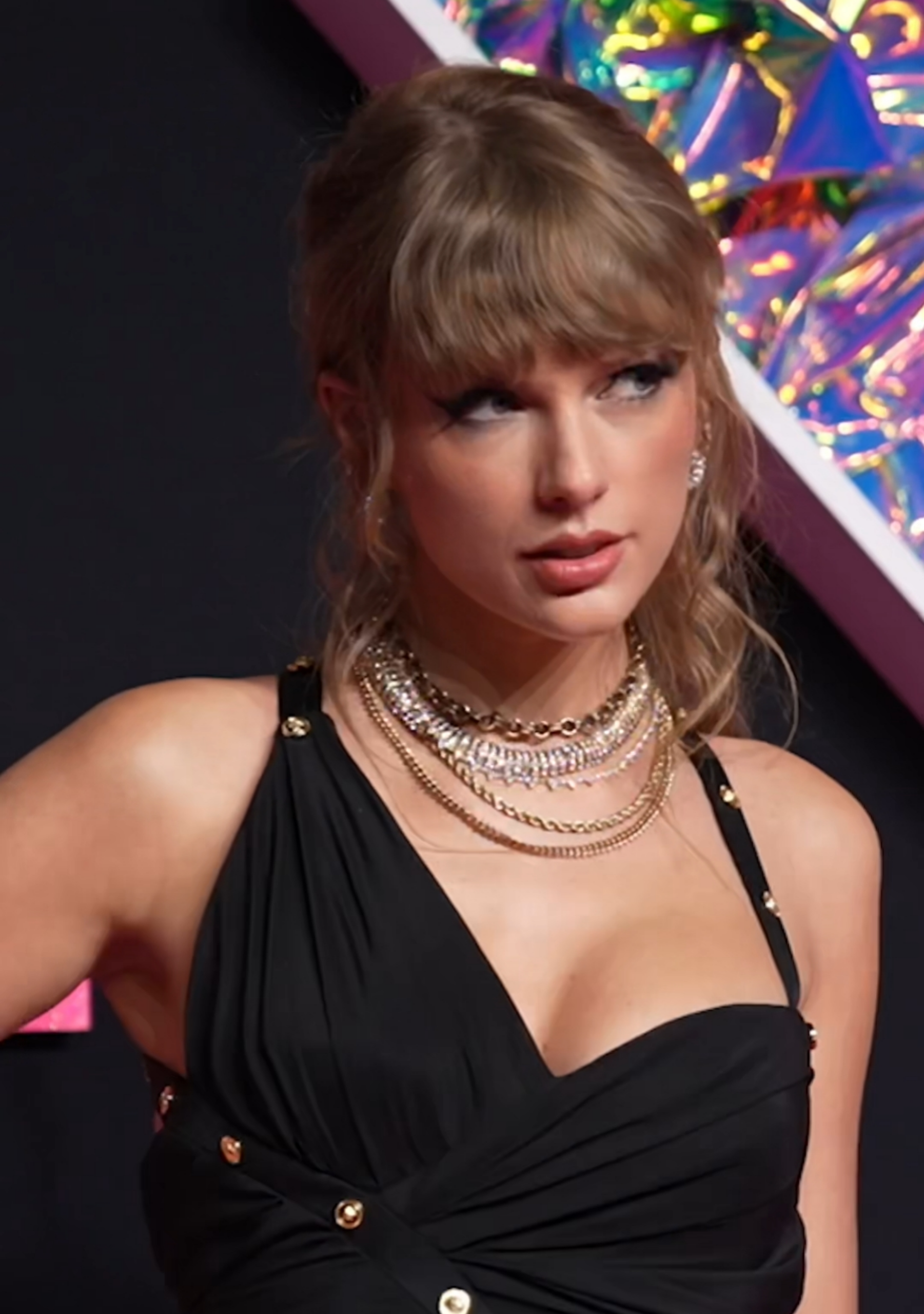
Taylor Swift has the highest debut at number eight with "The Fate of Ophelia".

=== Highest debut ===
Debut Position	Artist	Song	Debut Date	Source
No. 8	Taylor Swift	"The Fate of Ophelia"	October 18, 2025	
No. 12	Mariah Carey	"Dreamlover"	August 14, 1993	
No. 12	Taylor Swift	"Shake It Off"	September 6, 2014	
No. 13	Taylor Swift featuring Kendrick Lamar	"Bad Blood"	June 6, 2015	
No. 13	Taylor Swift featuring Post Malone	"Fortnight"	May 4, 2024	
No. 14	Lady Gaga	"Born This Way"	February 26, 2011	
No. 14	Justin Timberlake featuring Jay-Z	"Suit & Tie"	February 2, 2013	
No. 16	Madonna	"Frozen"	March 7, 1998	
No. 16	Britney Spears	"Hold It Against Me"	January 29, 2011	
No. 16	Miley Cyrus	"Flowers"	January 28, 2023	
No. 16	NSYNC	"Better Place"	October 14, 2023	
No. 16	Dua Lipa	"Houdini"	November 25, 2023	
No. 16	Bruno Mars	"I Just Might"	January 24, 2026	
No. 16	Harry Styles	"Aperture"	February 7, 2026	
No. 16	BTS	"Swim"	April 4, 2026	

=== Shortest climbs to number one ===
Week reached number one	Artist(s)	Song	Date reached number one	Source
4th week	Whitney Houston	"I Will Always Love You"	December 12, 1992	
4th week	Mariah Carey	"Dreamlover"	September 4, 1993	
4th week	The Rembrandts	"I'll Be There for You"	June 17, 1995	
4th week	Nelly featuring Tim McGraw	"Over and Over"	November 6, 2004	
5th week	Janet Jackson	"That's the Way Love Goes"	May 29, 1993	
5th week	Ace of Base	"All That She Wants"	October 30, 1993	
5th week	All-4-One	"I Swear"	May 28, 1994	
5th week	Boyz II Men	"I'll Make Love to You"	September 10, 1994	
5th week	Mariah Carey and Boyz II Men	"One Sweet Day"	December 9, 1995	
5th week	Taylor Swift featuring Kendrick Lamar	"Bad Blood"	July 4, 2015	
5th week	Adele	"Hello"	December 5, 2015	
5th week	Justin Timberlake	"Can't Stop the Feeling!"	June 18, 2016	
5th week	Miley Cyrus	"Flowers"	March 4, 2023	

=== Longest climbs to number one ===
Week reached number one	Artist(s)	Song	Date reached number one	Source
37th week	Lewis Capaldi	"Before You Go"	September 26, 2020	
33rd week	Tame Impala and Jennie	"Dracula"	July 11, 2026	
33rd week	Dominic Fike	"Babydoll"	November 7, 2026	
32nd week	Glass Animals	"Heat Waves"	January 29, 2022	
31st week	Benny Blanco, Halsey and Khalid	"Eastside"	March 2, 2019	
28th week	Trevor Daniel	"Falling"	July 25, 2020	
28th week	Rema and Selena Gomez	"Calm Down"	May 13, 2023	
28th week	Teddy Swims	"Mr. Know It All"	November 14, 2026	
27th week	Dua Lipa featuring DaBaby	"Levitating"	June 19, 2021	
26th week	Alessia Cara	"Here"	February 6, 2016	
26th week	Sombr	"Back to Friends"	February 7, 2026	

=== Biggest jump to number one ===
Chart movement	Artist(s)	Song	Date reached number one	Source
7–1	Nelly featuring Tim McGraw	"Over and Over"	November 6, 2004	
6–1	All-4-One	"I Swear"	May 28, 1994	
6–1	The Rembrandts	"I'll Be There for You"	June 17, 1995	
5–1	Nicki French	"Total Eclipse of the Heart"	June 10, 1995	
5–1	Mariah Carey and Boyz II Men	"One Sweet Day"	December 9, 1995	
5–1	Mariah Carey	"Shake It Off"	September 24, 2005	
5–1	Katy Perry featuring Snoop Dogg	"California Gurls"	July 3, 2010	
5–1	Katy Perry	"Roar"	September 28, 2013	
5–1	Tove Lo	"Habits (Stay High)"	November 15, 2014	
5–1	Demi Lovato	"Sorry Not Sorry"	November 4, 2017	
5–1	Shaboozey	"A Bar Song (Tipsy)"	August 17, 2024	

=== Biggest drop from number one ===
Chart movement	Artist(s)	Song	Date	Source
1–7	Taylor Swift	"Look What You Made Me Do"	November 4, 2017	
1–6	Shaggy featuring Rayvon	"Angel"	May 5, 2001	
1–5	Whitney Houston	"I Will Always Love You"	February 13, 1993	
1–5	Macklemore & Ryan Lewis featuring Ray Dalton	"Can't Hold Us"	July 20, 2013	
1–5	Selena Gomez	"Hands to Myself"	April 23, 2016	
1–5	Trevor Daniel	"Falling"	August 1, 2020	
1–5	Post Malone featuring Morgan Wallen	"I Had Some Help"	August 17, 2024	

=== Shortest climbs to the top 10 ===
Week reached top 10	Artist(s)	Song	Date reached top 10	Source
1st week	Taylor Swift	"The Fate of Ophelia"	October 18, 2025	
2nd week	Janet Jackson	"That's the Way Love Goes"	May 8, 1993	
2nd week	Mariah Carey	"Dreamlover"	August 21, 1993	
2nd week	The Rembrandts	"I'll Be There for You"	June 3, 1995	
2nd week	Madonna	"Frozen"	March 14, 1998	
2nd week	NSYNC	"Pop"	June 9, 2001	
2nd week	Eminem	"Just Lose It"	October 16, 2004	
2nd week	Britney Spears	"Hold It Against Me"	February 5, 2011	
2nd week	Lady Gaga	"Born This Way"	March 5, 2011	
2nd week	Taylor Swift	"Shake It Off"	September 13, 2014	
2nd week	Taylor Swift featuring Kendrick Lamar	"Bad Blood"	June 13, 2015	
2nd week	Justin Timberlake	"Can't Stop the Feeling!"	May 28, 2016	
2nd week	Taylor Swift	"Look What You Made Me Do"	September 16, 2017	
2nd week	Taylor Swift featuring Brendon Urie	"Me!"	May 11, 2019	
2nd week	Ed Sheeran	"Bad Habits"	July 10, 2021	

=== Longest climbs to the top 10 ===
Week reached top 10	Artist(s)	Song	Date reached top 10	Source
35th week	Lauv	"I Like Me Better"	June 23, 2018	
31st week	Edwin McCain	"I'll Be"	October 17, 1998	
28th week	Tame Impala and Jennie	"Dracula"	June 6, 2026	
27th week	Max featuring Gnash	"Lights Down Low"	February 3, 2018	
27th week	Lewis Capaldi	"Before You Go"	July 18, 2020	
27th week	AJR	"Bang!"	December 12, 2020	
27th week	Ella Langley	"Choosin' Texas"	August 15, 2026	
25th week	MKTO	"Classic"	July 12, 2014	
25th week	Daya	"Sit Still, Look Pretty"	October 15, 2016	
25th week	Jon Bellion	"All Time Low"	March 11, 2017	
25th week	Madison Beer	"Make You Mine"	September 7, 2024	

== Artist records ==
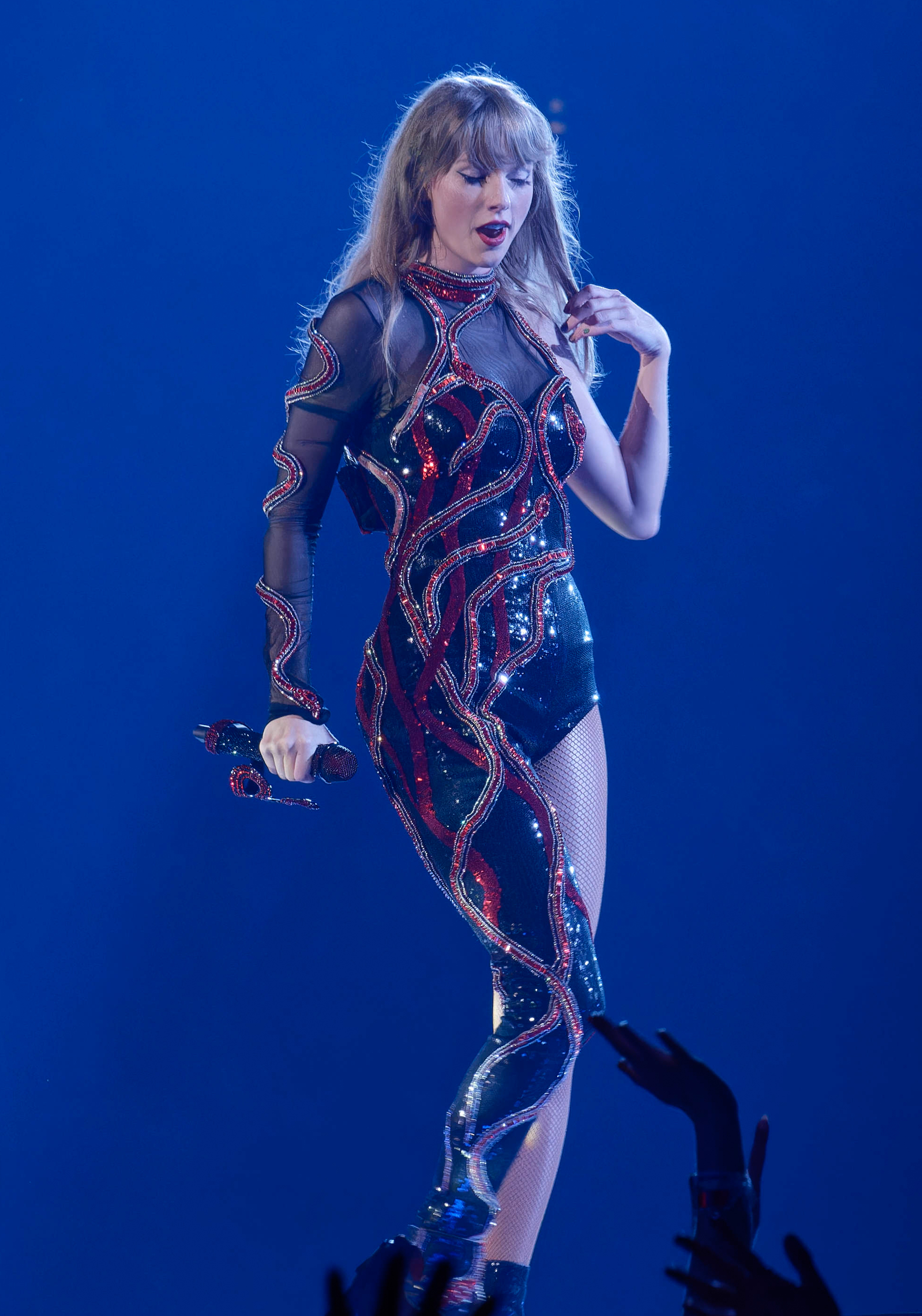
Taylor Swift holds the record for most number-one singles with 16, spanning over 17 years between her first and last hit. With 52 weeks at number-one, she also holds the record for having spent the most weeks at the summit.

=== Most number-one singles ===
Number of singles	Artist	Source
16	Taylor Swift	
13	Bruno Mars	
11	Ariana Grande	
11	Justin Bieber	
11	Katy Perry	
11	Maroon 5	
11	Rihanna	
9	Pink	
8	Doja Cat	
8	Justin Timberlake	
8	Lady Gaga	

=== Most cumulative weeks at number one ===
Number of weeks	Artist	Source
52	Taylor Swift	
47	Katy Perry	
45	Mariah Carey	
44	Bruno Mars	
41	Justin Bieber	
39	Maroon 5	
32	Ariana Grande	
32	Pink	
32	Rihanna	
29	Ace of Base	

=== Most top 10 singles ===
Number of singles	Artist	Source
30	Rihanna	
30	Taylor Swift	
25	Ariana Grande	
22	Justin Bieber	
22	Maroon 5	
21	Bruno Mars	
19	Justin Timberlake	
19	Pink	
18	The Weeknd	
17	Katy Perry	
17	Mariah Carey	

=== Most chart entries ===
Number of entries	Artist	Source
52	Rihanna	
52	Taylor Swift	
47	Nicki Minaj	
44	Justin Bieber	
43	Chris Brown	
42	Drake	
41	Pitbull	
39	Ariana Grande	
37	Britney Spears	
34	Justin Timberlake	

=== Simultaneously occupying the top two positions ===
- Mariah Carey: December 9, 1995
1. "One Sweet Day" (with Boyz II Men)
2. "Fantasy"
- OutKast: January 31–February 7, 2004
1. "Hey Ya!"
2. "The Way You Move" (featuring Sleepy Brown)
- Pharrell Williams: July 27–August 3, 2013
1. "Blurred Lines" (Robin Thicke featuring T.I. and Pharrell)
2. "Get Lucky" (Daft Punk featuring Pharrell Williams and Nile Rogers)
- Iggy Azalea: June 28–July 12, 2014
1. "Fancy" (featuring Charli XCX)
2. "Problem" (Ariana Grande featuring Iggy Azalea)
- Halsey: February 23–March 9, 2019
1. "Without Me"
2. "Eastside" (with Benny Blanco and Khalid)
- Ariana Grande: February 20, 2021
1. "34+35"
2. "Positions"
- Olivia Rodrigo: August 7–28, 2021
1. "Good 4 U"
2. "Deja Vu"
- Doja Cat: October 15–22, 2022
1. "I Like You (A Happier Song)" (Post Malone featuring Doja Cat)
2. "Vegas"
- Bruno Mars: February 8–March 8, 2025
1. "Apt." (Rosé and Bruno Mars)
2. "Die with a Smile" (Lady Gaga and Bruno Mars)
- Zara Larsson: June 27, 2026
1. "Midnight Sun"
2. "Stateside" (PinkPantheress with Zara Larsson)

=== Simultaneously three or more songs in the top 10 ===
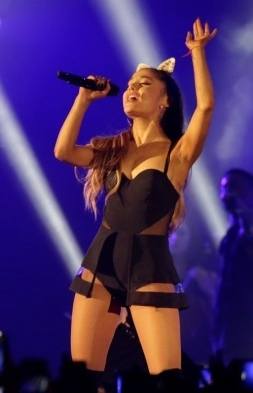
Ariana Grande became the first artist to post three top 10 songs at the same time in the Pop Airplay chart’s 29-year history and the first artist to succeed herself at number one as the only act credited on both tracks.

- Ariana Grande: May 15–22, 2021
  - "Positions"
  - "34+35"
  - "POV"
- Doja Cat: October 23–30, 2021
  - "Kiss Me More" (featuring SZA)
  - "You Right" (with The Weeknd)
  - "Need to Know"
- Harry Styles: October 15–29, 2022
  - "As It Was"
  - "Late Night Talking"
  - "Music for a Sushi Restaurant"
- Sabrina Carpenter: November 2–9, 2024
  - "Espresso"
  - "Please Please Please"
  - "Taste"

† Ariana Grande became the first artist to post three top 10 songs simultaneously.

=== Self-replacement at number one ===
- Mariah Carey — "Fantasy" → "One Sweet Day" (Mariah Carey and Boyz II Men) (December 9, 1995)
- OutKast — "Hey Ya!" → "The Way You Move" (OutKast featuring Sleepy Brown) (February 14, 2004)
- Iggy Azalea — "Fancy" (Iggy Azalea featuring Charli XCX) → "Problem" (Ariana Grande featuring Iggy Azalea) (July 12, 2014) †
- Halsey — "Without Me" → "Eastside" (Benny Blanco, Halsey and Khalid) (March 2, 2019)
- Ariana Grande — "Positions" → "34+35" (February 13, 2021) ††
- Doja Cat — "I Like You (A Happier Song)" (Post Malone featuring Doja Cat) → "Vegas" (October 22, 2022)
- Bruno Mars — "APT." (Rosé and Bruno Mars) → "Die with a Smile" (Lady Gaga and Bruno Mars) (March 8, 2025)
- Zara Larsson - "Stateside" (PinkPantheress with Zara Larsson) → "Midnight Sun" (June 27, 2026) †††

† Iggy Azalea is the only artist to replace herself at number one with her first two chart entries.

†† Ariana Grande became the first artist to succeed herself at number one as the only act credited on both tracks.

††† Zara Larsson became the first artist to have her first two number ones in two consecutive weeks.

=== Additional artist achievements ===
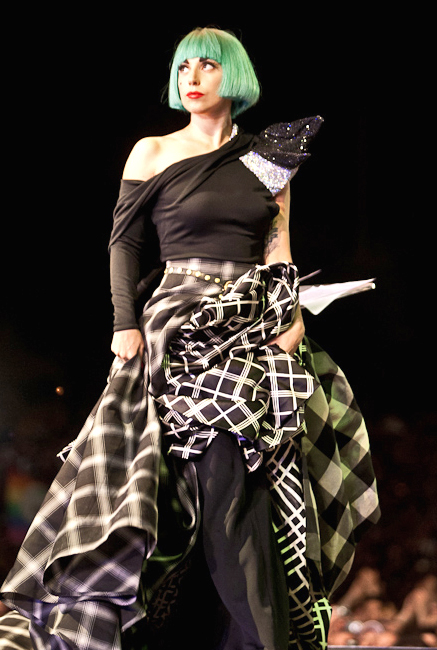
Lady Gaga is the only musical artist in history to have her first six singles all reach the number-one position on this chart.

- Lady Gaga is the only artist to have her first six singles reach No. 1.
- JoJo became the youngest (13) solo artist to have a number-one single on the chart with "Leave (Get Out)".
- Rihanna is the youngest (22) artist to attain at least seven No. 1 singles on the chart.
- Justin Bieber became the youngest (26) male artist to attain at least seven No. 1 singles on the chart with "Intentions" (featuring Quavo).
- Kate Bush broke the record for the oldest song to have ever charted on the Mainstream Top 40 chart with "Running Up That Hill", originally released in 1985. It charted in 2022 after its use in the fourth season of Stranger Things. The previous record holder was Empire of the Sun, whose song "Walking on a Dream", originally released in 2008, charted in 2016 after its use in a Honda commercial.
- Ariana Grande achieved at least one No. 1 with each of her seven studio albums, therefore holding the record for the longest streak; she surpassed Rihanna with six albums.

== Album records ==
=== Most number-one singles from an album ===
Number of singles	Artist	Album	Year(s)	Source
6	Katy Perry	Teenage Dream	2010–12	
5	Taylor Swift	1989	2014–15	
4	Justin Timberlake	FutureSex/LoveSounds	2006–07	
4	Lady Gaga	The Fame	2009	
4	Sabrina Carpenter	Short n' Sweet	2024–25	
3	Ace of Base	The Sign	1993–94	
3	Alanis Morissette	Jagged Little Pill	1996	
3	Avril Lavigne	Let Go	2002–03	
3	Maroon 5	Overexposed	2012–13	
3	Justin Bieber	Purpose	2015–16	
3	Selena Gomez	Revival	2015–16	
3	Dua Lipa	Future Nostalgia	2020–21	
3	Lil Nas X	Montero	2021–22	
3	Doja Cat	Planet Her	2021–22	

† Katy Perry's Teenage Dream: The Complete Confection, a reissue of the Teenage Dream album, featured one additional number-one single, "Wide Awake".

†† Taylor Swift's 1989 (Taylor's Version), a re-recording of the 1989 album, featured one additional number-one single, "Is It Over Now?".
