= Loudwire =

American online music magazine

- Website type: Online magazine
- Owner: Townsquare Media
- Website: Loudwire
- Commercial: Yes
- Current status: Active

Loudwire is an American online media magazine that covers hard rock and heavy metal news. It is owned by media and entertainment business Townsquare Media. Since its launch in August 2011, Loudwire has secured exclusive interviews with high-profile artists such as Slipknot, Ozzy Osbourne, Metallica, Judas Priest, Guns N' Roses, Megadeth, Iron Maiden, Kiss, Mötley Crüe, Suicidal Tendencies and many others. Loudwire has also exclusively premiered new material from Judas Priest, Anthrax, Jane's Addiction, Stone Sour, Phil Anselmo, and many more of rock and metal's notable acts.

Loudwire Nights and Loudwire Weekend are Townsquare's nationally syndicated radio programs, airing on its rock stations throughout the country.

One of Loudwire's web series is Wikipedia: Fact or Fiction?.

== Loudwire Music Awards ==
The magazine organizes the Loudwire Music Awards, an annual awards ceremony. The first ceremony and concert, hosted by Chris Jericho, were held on October 24, 2017, at The Novo in Los Angeles. Awards are given based on votes cast by the readers of the website.
