= Trouble in Paradise (Chlöe album) =

2024 studio album by Chlöe

Studio album by Chlöe
- Released: August 9, 2024
- Recorded: July - November 2023
- Genres: Alternative R&B; pop; Afro fusion
- Length: 48:40
- Labels: Parkwood; Columbia
- Producers: Anderson .Paak; Frankie Bash; Bizness Boi; BongoByTheWay; Cashmere Brown; Rogét Chahayed; Chlöe; Aladdin Dawda; Fridayy; Go Grizzly; Akeel Henry; Eric Hudson; Carter Lang; Johan Lenox; Julia Lewis; Rian Lewis; Heavy Mellow; Mocha Bands; Kurtis McKenzie; Oh Gosh Leotus; Ari PenSmith; SG Lewis; Sammy Soso; Subrosa; De'Jour Thomas; UPNORTH; Yeti Beats

Chlöe chronology
In Pieces (2023)	Trouble in Paradise (2024)	Resurrection (2026)

Singles from Trouble in Paradise
- 1. "FYS" Released: March 1, 2024; 2. "Boy Bye" Released: April 12, 2024

Trouble in Paradise is the second studio album by American singer and songwriter Chlöe. It was released by Parkwood Entertainment and Columbia Records on August 9, 2024 and was supported by two singles preceding its release: "FYS" and "Boy Bye".

== Background and composition ==
In March 2023, Chlöe released her debut solo album, In Pieces, and embarked on her first headlining tour, the In Pieces Tour, in promotion of the album almost two weeks later. Chlöe announced her second album's title during her Coachella performance on April 19, 2024.

In an interview with Nylon, Chlöe described the album as a "summer fling" and "a coming-of-age celebration of being a woman and having fun, not taking life too seriously." The album was also inspired by the time she spent in Saint Lucia, where the album was mostly recorded. The album features guest appearances and vocals from Fridayy, Ty Dolla Sign, Anderson .Paak, YG Marley, Jeremih and her sister Halle, while the tracks are produced by BongoByTheWay, Yeti Beats, Kurtis McKenzie, Carter Lang, Johan Lenox and Ari PenSmith.

== Promotion ==
"FYS" was released as the album's lead single on March 1, 2024., with the second single "Boy Bye" being released a month later on April 12, 2024.

== Critical reception ==
Professional ratings
Review scores
Source	Rating
Clash	7/10

Shahzaib Hussain of Clash wrote that Chlöe is "creating without pressure and with abandon" for "her nimble, acrobatic voice". Hussain described the album as "transposing the carnal intimations and vocal intimacy of early '00s RnB to tactile, carnival-flavoured beats" and "lugubrious, log-drum rhythms of Amapiano and the bright, syncopated elation of Afro-pop", whose "experimentation [...] sometimes soars, and sometimes falls flat".

Zachary Horvath of HotNewHipHop praised the production, writing that it featured "many subsets of R&B such as contemporary, Afrobeats, and pop", pointing out the evolution of "Chlöe's dynamic and showstopping vocal performances" in comparison to the previous album.

== Track listing ==
Trouble in Paradise track listing
No.	Title	Lyrics	Music	Producer(s)	Length
1.	"All I Got (Free Falling)"	Chloe Bailey; Ant Clemons	Loren Davis, Jr.; Uforo Ebong; Stephen Feigenbaum; Francis LeBlanc; Andre Robertson	Bizness Boi; BongoByTheWay; Fridayy; Johan Lenox; Oh Gosh Leotus	1:56
2.	"Might as Well" (with Ty Dolla Sign)	Forest "4rest" Moore; Tyrone Griffin, Jr.	Bailey; Michael Archer; Bjrnck; Ebong; Eric Hudson; Marcus Kincy; Peezy; Raphael Saadiq	BongoByTheWay; Hudson; Peezy^{[a]}	3:22
3.	"Boy Bye"	Bailey; Soraya LaPread; Jesse Saint John	Rogét Chahayed; Carter Lang; Kurtis McKenzie; David Sprecher	Lang; McKenzie; Chahayed; Yeti Beats	3:25
4.	"Redemption"	Bailey	Bailey; Believve; Mocha Bands; Ariowa Irosogie; Sammy Soso	Ari PenSmith; Mocha Bands; Sammy Soso	1:23
5.	"Temporarily Single"	Bailey	Bailey; Derek Allen; Nicolai Andersen; Anders Christiansen; Ebong; Tyrese Gibson; Kasper Knudsen	BongoByTheWay; UPNORTH	3:11
6.	"Rose"	Bailey; Clemons	Ebong; Akeel Henry	BongoByTheWay	2:55
7.	"Favorite" (with Anderson .Paak)	Moore; Brandon Anderson; Jocelyn Donald	Bailey; Paak; Luke Crowder; Ebong; Henry; Toki	BongoByTheWay; Anderson .Paak; Henry^{[a]}; Crowder^{[a]}	2:32
8.	"Same Lingerie"	Moore	Bailey; Bjrnck; Ebong; Henry	BongoByTheWay; Henry^{[a]}	3:16
9.	"Never Let You Go" (with YG Marley)	Bailey; Joshua Marley	Bailey; Aladdin; Dawda; Kevin Price	Chlöe; Dawda; Aladdin; Go Grizzly	3:15
10.	"Want Me" (with Halle)	C. Bailey	C. Bailey; Burt Bacharach; Ernest Bonsu; Hal David; Ebong	BongoByTheWay; Subrosa	4:08
11.	"Moments"	Bailey; Goldiie	Ebong	BongoByTheWay	2:43
12.	"FYS"	Bailey	Bailey; Ebong	Chlöe; BongoByTheWay; Cashmere Brown; Go Grizzly	3:27
13.	"Nice Girls Finish Last"	Bailey; Clemons	Ebong; De'Jour Thomas	BongoByTheWay; D. Thomas	3:51
14.	"Strawberry Lemonade"	Bailey; Liana Banks; Theron Thomas	Lydia Asrat; Samuel Lewis; Sprecher	SG Lewis; Yeti Beats	3:03
15.	"Shake" (featuring Jeremih)	Bailey; Jeremy Felton	Cuzzo Chris; Ebong; Fox; Henry	BongoByTheWay; Henry	2:58
16.	"Somebody"	Bailey; Saint John	Colin Franken; Everett Romano; Julia Lewis; Saint John; Sprecher	Frankie Bash; Heavy Mellow; J. Lewis; Rian Lewis; Yeti Beats	3:15
Total length:					48:40

Note

- ^{^[a]} signifies an executive producer

== Personnel ==
Musicians

- Chloe Bailey – vocals
- BongoByTheWay – piano (tracks 1, 10), programming (7, 10); synthesizer, vocals (7, 13); drums (10, 13), bass (13)
- Johan Lenox – strings, vocals (track 1)
- Fridayy – background vocals (track 1)
- Ty Dolla Sign – vocals (track 2)
- Ari PenSmith – background vocals (track 4)
- Believve – background vocals (track 4)
- Mocha Bands – background vocals (track 4)
- Sammy Sosa – background vocals (track 4)
- Shermay Barnes – vocals (track 4)
- Akeel Henry – bass (tracks 7, 8), keyboards (7), strings (8)
- Anderson .Paak – drums, vocals (track 7)
- Toki – drums (track 7)
- Luke Crowder – horn (track 7)
- Cordarius Bradley – trombone (track 7)
- Ralston Albert – trumpet (track 7)
- YG Marley – vocals (track 9)
- Lekan Olanrewaju – background vocals (track 10)
- Subrosa – bass guitar (track 10)
- Halle – vocals (track 10)
- De'Jour Thomas – keyboards, synth bass (track 13)
- Kareen Lomax – background vocals (track 15)
- Trey Campbell – background vocals (track 15)
- Jeremih – vocals (track 15)

Technical

- Colin Leonard– mastering
- Antonio Tucci Jr. – mixing (tracks 1–13, 15, 16), engineering (1, 2, 4–13, 15, 16)
- Serban Ghenea – mixing (track 14)
- Rian Lewis – engineering (tracks 3, 14)
- Ian Gold –engineering (track 3)
- Ari PenSmith – engineering (track 4)
- Sammy Soso – engineering (track 4)
- David "Pac" Urresta – engineering (track 9)
- Pat Kelly – engineering (track 10)
- Alex Burns – engineering (track 12)
- Chloe Bailey – vocal production
- Rob Marion – engineering assistance (tracks 3, 5)
