= Sexy 4eva World Tour =

2019–20 concert tour by Jay Park

Sexy 4 Eva World Tour
- Tour by Jay Park
- Start date: July 6, 2019
- End date: January 12, 2020
- Legs: 3
- No. of shows: 10 in Asia; 7 in Europe; 12 in North America; 4 in Australasia; 33 total
- Website: Tour Website

Jay Park concert chronology
- European Tour (2013); Sexy 4 Eva World Tour (2019-20)

The Sexy 4 Eva World Tour (stylized as the SEXY 4EVA World Tour) was the third headlining concert tour by Korean-American recording artist Jay Park. The tour was advertised as Park's first solo world tour. It began July 2019 in South Korea, playing over 30 shows in Asia, Europe, North America and Australasia.

Pop-up stores selling tour merchandise appeared in Seoul, Tokyo, London, and Seattle during their respective tour dates.

== Background ==
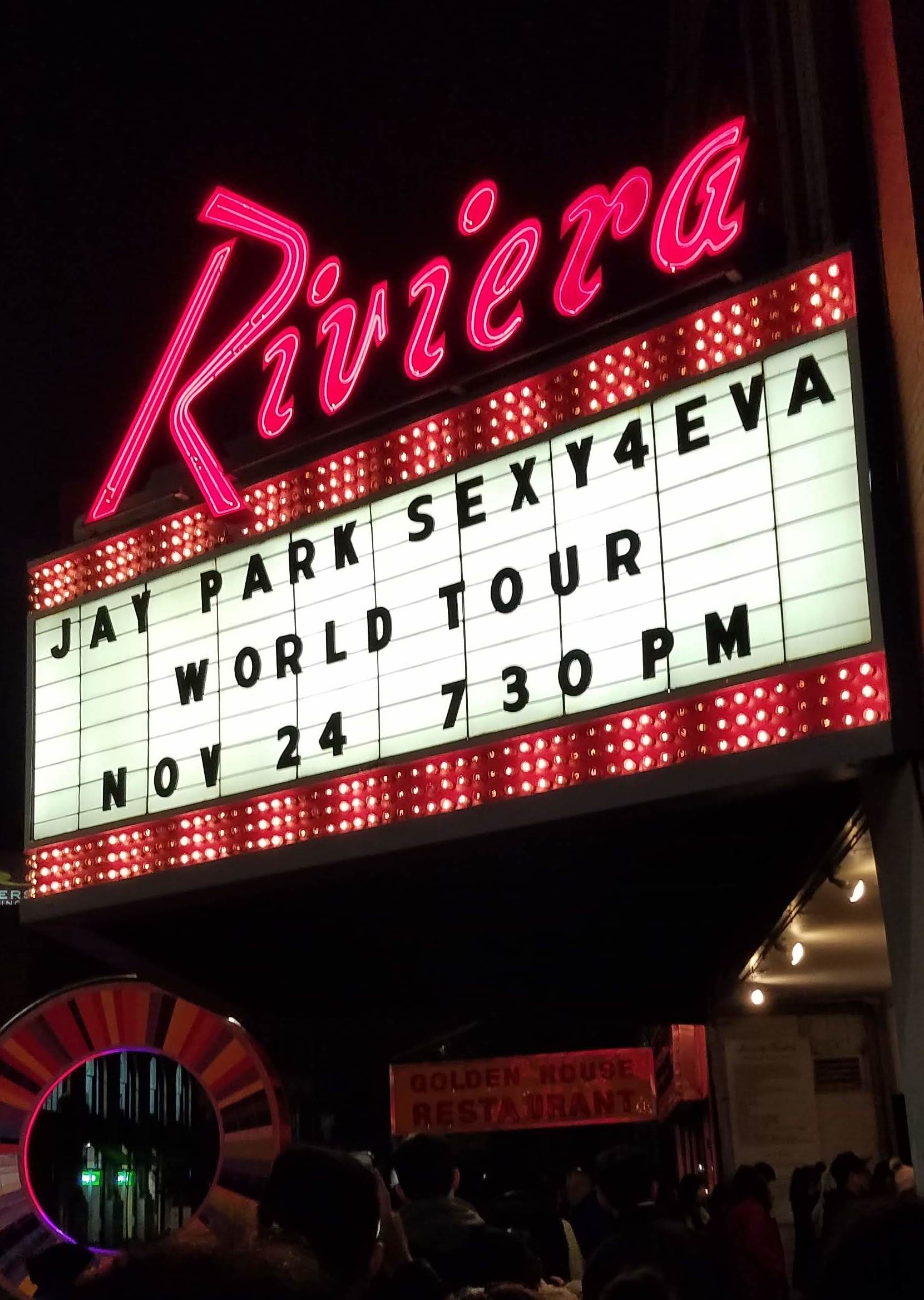
Jay Park concert at the Riviera Theatre in Chicago.

Jay Park announced his world tour on social media on May 10, 2019 with two shows scheduled in Seoul, South Korea. On June 1, 2019, he announced the dates for the European leg of his tour. Early bird tickets for the North American leg of the tour went on sale on June 26, 2019. Other tickets went on sale on June 28, 2019. On August 25, 2019, tour dates in New Zealand and Australia were announced.

Ted Park performed during part of the North American leg of the tour.

== Opening acts ==
- DJ Wegun
- Woo Won-jae (Singapore)
- Haon (Singapore)
- pH-1 (Europe)
- Golden (Europe)
- Avatar Darko (North America)
- Hoody (North America)
- Jarv Dee (North America)
- Ted Park (North America)
- Sogumm (North America)
- Punchnello (North America & Oceania)
- Woodie Gochild (Oceania)

== Setlist ==
The following setlist was obtained from the concert held on September 6, 2019, at the Shrine Auditorium in Downtown Core, Singapore. It does not represent every concert for the duration of the tour.

1. "Forget About Tomorrow"
2. "Me Like Yuh"
3. "Solo"
4. "Iffy"
5. "Joah"
6. "Drive"
7. "My Last"
8. "V"
9. "All I Wanna Do"
10. "Yacht"
11. "Feng Shui"
12. "Dank"
13. "사실은 (The Truth Is)"
14. "곁에 있어주길 (Stay With Me)"
15. "Abandoned"
16. "Know Your Name"
17. "Worldwide"
18. "Finish Line"
19. "On It"
20. "SOJU"
21. "K-TOWN"
22. "우리가 빠지면 Party가 아니지 (Ain't No Party Like an AOMG Party)"
23. "몸매 (Mommae)"
24. "Sexy 4 Eva"
25. "All Day (Flex)"
26. "Water"
27. "Giddy Up"
28. "니가 알던 내가 아냐 (Remix) [Who You (Remix)]"

== Shows ==
List of concerts, showing date, city, country, and venue
Date	City	Country	Venue
Asia
July 6, 2019	Seoul	South Korea	Olympic Hall
July 7, 2019	Seoul	South Korea	Olympic Hall
September 6, 2019	Downtown Core	Singapore	Shine Auditorium
September 8, 2019 (Postponed)	Kowloon	Hong Kong	Rotunda Hall
September 16, 2019	Tokyo	Japan	Toyosu Pit
September 19, 2019	Osaka	Japan	Zepp Namba
September 21, 2019	Bangkok	Thailand	GMM Live House
September 22, 2019	Quezon City	Philippines	New Frontier Theater
September 27, 2019	Kuala Lumpur	Malaysia	KL Live
September 29, 2019	Taipei	Taiwan	ATT Show Box
Europe
October 17, 2019	Helsinki	Finland	The Circus
October 20, 2019	London	England	Olympia National
October 23, 2019	Madrid	Spain	Sala Riviera
October 25, 2019	Paris	France	Élysée Montmartre
October 27, 2019	Berlin	Germany	Knorkatorhalle
October 31, 2019	Amsterdam	Netherlands	Melkweg
November 2, 2019	Moscow	Russia	Gorbunov Palace of Culture
North America
November 4, 2019	Los Angeles	United States	The Novo by Microsoft
November 6, 2019	San Francisco	United States	Warfield Theatre
November 8, 2019	Calgary	Canada	MacEwan Hall Ballroom
November 10, 2019	Vancouver	Canada	Orpheum Theatre
November 12, 2019	Toronto	Canada	Rebel
November 14, 2019	New York City	United States	Terminal 5
November 16, 2019	Miami Beach	United States	The Fillmore Miami Beach
November 18, 2019	Atlanta	United States	Tabernacle
November 20, 2019	Dallas	United States	The Bomb Factory
November 22, 2019	Minneapolis	United States	State Theatre
November 24, 2019	Chicago	United States	Riviera Theatre
November 27, 2019	Honolulu (Australasia)	United States	Hawaii Theatre
December 1, 2019	Seattle	United States	Showbox SoDo
Australasia
January 8, 2020	Auckland	New Zealand	Logan Campbell Centre
January 10, 2020	Sydney	Australia	Enmore Theatre
January 12, 2020	Melbourne	Australia	Festival Hall
