= Surprise (song) =

Single by Chlöe
- Released: June 17, 2022
- Recorded: 2021
- Genre: R&B
- Length: 2:35
- Label: Parkwood
- Composers: Scott Storch; Ray Fraser
- Lyricists: Chloe Bailey; Feli Ferraro
- Producers: Scott Storch; Illa

Chlöe singles chronology
"Treat Me" (2022)	"Surprise" (2022)	"For the Night" (2022)

Music video
- "Surprise" on YouTube

"Surprise" is a song by American singer Chlöe. It was released on June 17, 2022, through Parkwood Entertainment. An accompanying music video, directed by Diana Kunst, was released alongside the song.

== Background and release ==
In 2021, Bailey released her debut solo single, "Have Mercy". She released her second single, "Treat Me", in April 2022.

In May 2022, Bailey held an Instagram Live to choose which song she would release as the third single from her album. The three options were "For the Night", "Cheat Back", and "Surprise". On June 15, announced that she had chosen "Surprise" as the third single, and that it would release in two days. The song was picked to be released by Beyoncé, who founded Parkwood Entertainment, despite the song not being the fan-favorite. The song was released on June 17. The song's cover artwork showcases the singer lying face down on top of a pillow, without a shirt.

== Composition ==
"Surprise" is a steamy, R&B-leaning song. Bailey sings over a heavy bass beat and a "video-game esque sound effect". The song was produced by Scott Storch.

== Music video ==
The music video for "Surprise" was directed by Diana Kunst. It includes intimate scenes between the singer and a male love interest, who is played by American model and actor Broderick Hunter. She also dances in a Balenciaga underwear set. At the end of the video, it is revealed that the intimate scenes were made up in the man's mind.

== Live performances ==
On June 26, 2022, Bailey performed "Surprise" in a medley with "Treat Me" at the 2022 BET Awards.

== Credits ==
Credits adapted from Spotify.

- Chloe Bailey – performer, songwriter
- Scott Storch – producer, songwriter
- Illa – producer
- Ray Fraser – songwriter
- Feli Ferraro – songwriter

== Charts ==
Weekly chart performance for "Surprise"
Chart (2022)	Peak position
US Hot R&B Songs (Billboard)	2
US R&B/Hip-Hop Digital Song Sales (Billboard)	2
