= In Pieces Tour =

2023 concert tour by Chloe Bailey

- Tour by Chlöe
- Associated album: In Pieces
- Start date: April 11, 2023
- End date: September 21, 2023
- Legs: 2
- No. of shows: 25
- Supporting acts: DJ Rosegold, System Olympia

Chlöe concert chronology
- In Pieces Tour (2023); ...

The In Pieces Tour was the debut concert tour by American singer and songwriter Chlöe. It was announced on February 28, 2023, in support of her debut single studio album In Pieces (2023). The tour began on April 11, 2023, in Chicago, Illinois and concluded on September 21, 2023, in London, England.

== Background ==
On February 28, 2023, Bailey announced the tour through her social media. She also said she will be performing every song from the new album. The caption reads as follows: "I'm headlining my very own solo tour performing all the songs from the new album. y'all I'm so excited. see you there." The three dates sold out since the release of her album were Chicago, New York, and Atlanta.

On April 7, Sol Blume announced of rescheduling the festival to August, due to the venue being flooded from severe weather storms. Their statement included, "As another round of rainfall hit the area last week, park officials notified us that we would not be able to host the event as scheduled in the interest of public safety." For the first tour date on April 11 in Chicago, FootwearNews reported of Chlöe arriving "onstage in a black coat dress," which she later removed to reveal a sequin bodysuit. They added, "the musician styled her long red locs in a high ponytail and went with shimmery eyeshadow and a neutral matte pout. Other photos and videos show that Bailey tied her outfit together with leather ankle boots. The glossy style had a triangular pointed toe and was set on a chunky block heel." On April 13, 2023, Chlöe announced that the Toronto, Ontario date was rescheduled because of travel and scheduling conflicts. Along with this, an extra New York show was added.

On April 23, for the Atlanta show, she brought out her sister Halle Bailey, where they performed their songs "Ungodly Hour" and "Do It" together. During this stop, she was also honored her own day, "Chloe Bailey Appreciation Day", which was presented by Fulton County Commissioner Natalie Hall on behalf of the city.

On May 25, the documentary for the first leg premiered to Chlöe's YouTube channel; it was directed by Bailey, shot by Julian Dakdouk, and edited by Peter Insinna. She stated on Instagram, "What an incredible run. I will never forget this moment in my life. There was definitely enough blood, sweat, and tears to fill a swimming pool. But you all made it so worthwhile. Freedom… that's what I felt every time I stepped on that stage. It was almost as if I could fly. Thank you for flying high with me, for loving me, for selling the stage out every night, and making my first headlining tour so special… I love you. In pieces tour doc out now on my YouTube 🤍."

On July 12, she announced the second leg for August–September, with pre-sale being available and general tickets on sale for that Friday. On July 21, it was announced of her one-night UK show at O2 Shepherd's Bush Empire in London, England.

== Critical reception ==
Revolt reported, "During the sold-out event, Chlöe entertained her fans with a show of various songs, including tunes from her recently released debut album, In Pieces. The 24-year-old's stage presence kept her audience highly engaged…" They added of her message to all the haters, in front of the backdrop with the critical comments: "Fuck what the fuck everybody got to fucking say. They can kiss my Black ass. Because I know you guys love me. And this is all I need. Thank you for loving me. Thank you for being here. Thank you for your energy."

Houston Press said of the April 25 concert, "Chloe controlled the crowd with her stage presence—impressing the sold-out crowd." They added, "Even with a packed show with almost twenty tracks from her solo album as well as hits from Chloe x Halle, Chloe tailored the show toward the crowd, improvising on some songs and even halting one song at its climax to direct people to help a fan."

== Tour dates ==
List of concerts
Date	City	Country	Venue	Opening Act
April 11, 2023	Chicago	United States	Riviera Theatre	DJ Rosegold
April 13, 2023	Detroit	United States	The Fillmore Detroit	DJ Rosegold
April 17, 2023	Boston	United States	House of Blues	DJ Rosegold
April 18, 2023	Philadelphia	United States	The Fillmore Philadelphia	DJ Rosegold
April 20, 2023	New York City	United States	Terminal 5	DJ Rosegold
April 21, 2023	New York City	United States	Brooklyn Steel	DJ Rosegold
April 23, 2023	Atlanta	United States	The Eastern	DJ Rosegold
April 25, 2023	Houston	United States	House of Blues Houston	DJ Rosegold
April 26, 2023	Dallas	United States	House of Blues Dallas	DJ Rosegold
May 3, 2023	Los Angeles	United States	The Novo	DJ Rosegold
August 20, 2023 (Note: This concert was a part of Sol Blume Festival.)	Sacramento	United States	Discovery Park	DJ Rosegold
August 22, 2023	San Diego	United States	The Observatory North Park	DJ Rosegold
August 23, 2023	Anaheim	United States	House of Blues Anaheim	DJ Rosegold
August 26, 2023	Denver	United States	Ogden Theatre	DJ Rosegold
August 29, 2023	Minneapolis	United States	First Avenue	DJ Rosegold
August 31, 2023	Cleveland	United States	House of Blues Cleveland	DJ Rosegold
September 1, 2023	Indianapolis	United States	Egyptian Room at Old National Centre	DJ Rosegold
September 2, 2023	Grand Rapids	United States	The Intersection	DJ Rosegold
September 4, 2023	Toronto	Canada	Phoenix Concert Theatre	DJ Rosegold
September 6, 2023	Norfolk	United States	The NorVa	DJ Rosegold
September 7, 2023	Charlotte	United States	The Fillmore Charlotte	DJ Rosegold
September 9, 2023	Tampa	United States	The Ritz Ybor	DJ Rosegold
September 10, 2023	Fort Lauderdale	United States	Revolution	DJ Rosegold
September 21, 2023	London	United Kingdom	O_{2} Shepherd's Bush Empire	System Olympia

== Cancelled shows ==
List of cancelled concerts, showing date, city, country, venue and reason for cancellation
Date	City	Country	Venue	Reason
Leg 1
April 14, 2023	Toronto	Canada	Rebel	Travel conflicts
April 30, 2023	Sacramento	United States	Discovery Park	Weather conditions
Leg 2
August 24, 2023	Phoenix	United States	The Van Buren	Beyoncé performing in the city on the same day
