= FYS (song) =

Single by Chlöe

from the album Trouble in Paradise
- Released: March 1, 2024
- Recorded: July – August 2023
- Genre: R&B
- Length: 3:29
- Label: Parkwood; Columbia
- Composers: Chloe Bailey; BongoByTheWay
- Lyricist: Chloe Bailey
- Producers: Cashmere Brown; Chlöe; BongoByTheWay; Go Grizzly

Chlöe singles chronology
"Winter Wonderland" (2023)	"FYS" (2024)	"Boy Bye" (2024)

Music video
- "FYS" on YouTube

"FYS" (short for "Fuck Your Status"; stylized as "F*** Your Status") is a song by American singer-songwriter Chlöe from her second studio album Trouble in Paradise (2024). It was released on March 1, 2024, through Parkwood Entertainment and Columbia Records, as the lead single from the album.

== Background and release ==
In early February, 2024, Chlöe and Halle confirmed they were working on a new project together. Despite this, on February 24, 2024 Chlöe announced the publication of "FYS" as a solo single. Halle also announced a solo song, "In Your Hands", published on March 15, 2024.

== Composition ==
"FYS" was written and produced by the singer herself with BongoByTheWay. Chlöe explained the meaning of the song: "I wrote this song to be like "f*** your status," it doesn’t matter because I have this on my own. So you having cars and you having money it doesn’t really matter... I just want to love you... This song is really just about loving someone for who they are and not what they have or can give you monetarily wise."

== Reception ==
Clash writer Hussain Shahzaib described the song as a "bold departure from the emotionally brittle feel of its predecessor... more earthy and lyrically risqué" and linking the "murky, mercurial R&B" to the first Chloe x Halle projects. Álex González of Uproxx described the sound as "rhythmic and alternative R&B", praising the lyrics about self-empowerment.

== Live performance ==
Chlöe performed the song live at the 35th GLAAD Media Awards on March 14, 2024.
