= Riviera Theatre =

Music venue and former movie theater in Chicago, Illinois

Coordinates: 41.96858°N 87.65988°W

- The Riv
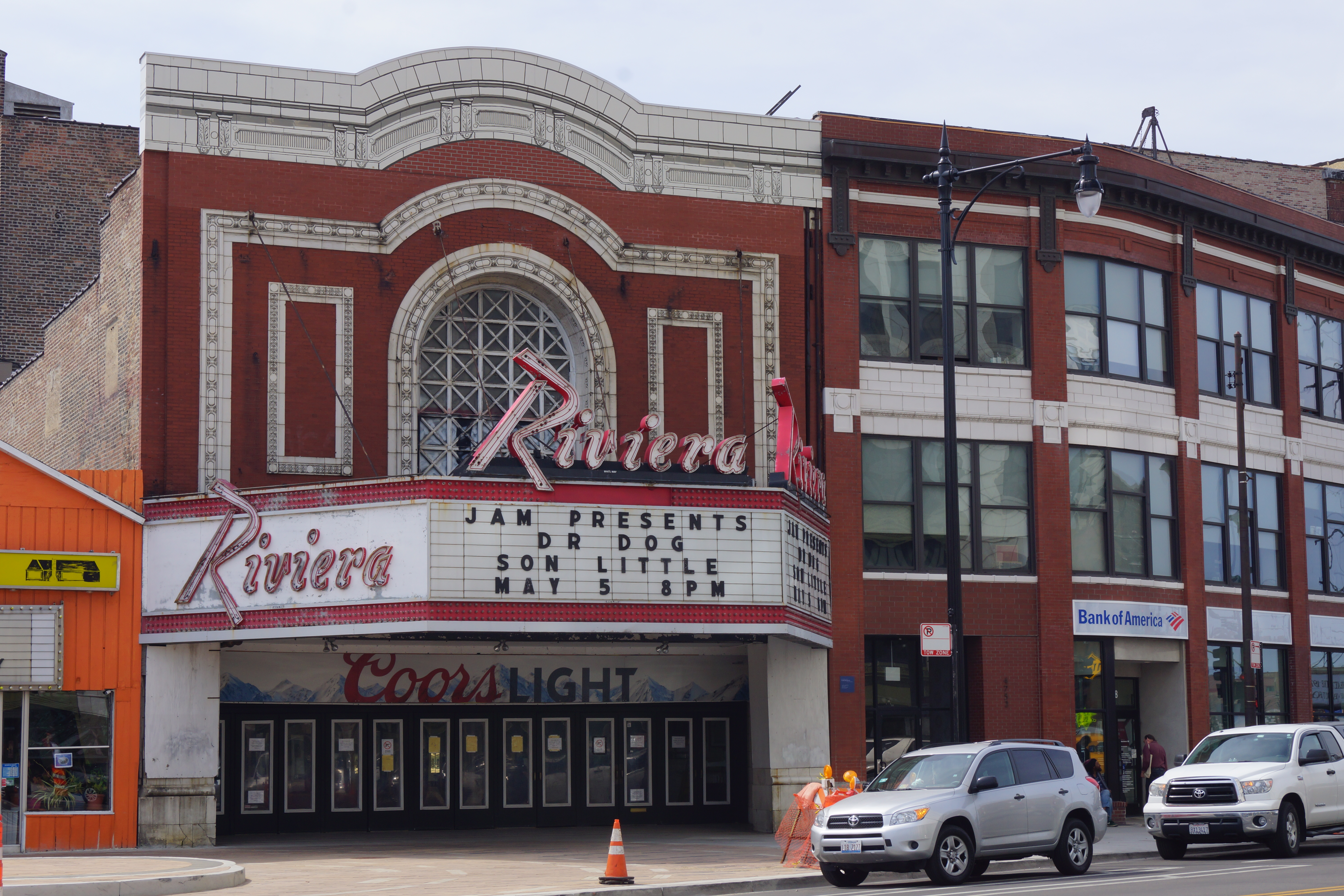
- Interactive map of Riviera Theatre
- Address: 4746 N Racine Ave; Chicago, IL 60640-4912
- Location: Sheridan Park
- Owner: Jam Productions
- Capacity: 2,500

Construction
- Opened: October 2, 1918
- Cost: $585,000 ($14.7 million in 2025 dollars)
- Architect: C.W. Rapp

Website
- Venue Website

The Riviera Theatre is a concert venue located in the Uptown neighborhood of Chicago, Illinois.

== History ==
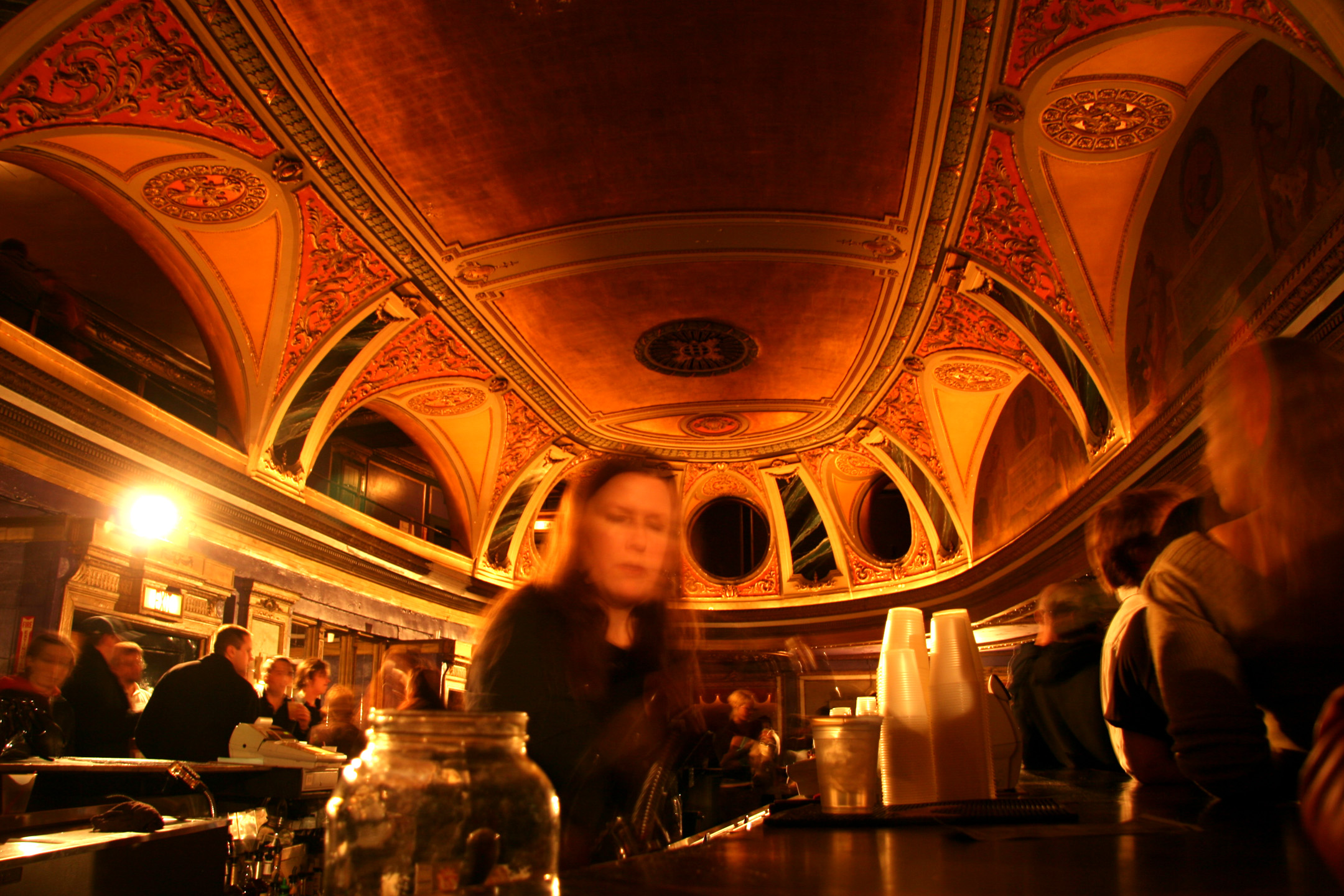
Lobby of theatre, 2006

Built in 1917, it was designed by Rapp and Rapp for the Balaban & Katz theatre chain run by A. J. Balaban, his brother Barney Balaban and their partner and brother-in-law, Sam Katz. It is an example of French Renaissance Revival architecture. It later became a private nightclub in 1986. The theatre is located in the Uptown section of the city, at the intersection of Lawrence, Broadway and Racine. The area has several notable theaters, including the Aragon Ballroom, which is only 0.2 miles away. Since 2006 it has been owned by Chicago-based Jam Productions (itself owned by Jerry Mickelson and Arny Granat), which claims to be the "largest independent producer of live entertainment in the United States".

In October 2015 in a labor dispute, Jam Productions fired the stagehands of the Riviera Theatre.

The Riviera Theatre continues to serve as a venue for many popular acts, both local and national. In 2026, it hosted the International Mr. Leather contest.

== Notable events ==
- Hüsker Dü, with opener Roger Miller, played at the Riviera on March 14, 1987 in support of what would be their final studio album Warehouse: Songs and Stories.
- My Life with the Thrill Kill Kult performed at the theatre October 28, 1988 and three tracks from the performance were released in 2004 as part of the reissue for their debut album.
- Jody Watley performed at the theatre July 21, 1989 during her Larger Than Life album tour.
- Tin Machine performed at the theatre during their It's My Life Tour on December 12, 1991, which was recorded and became part of their live album, Tin Machine Live: Oy Vey, Baby.
- Groove metal band Pantera Filmed their music video for Walk at the theater in 1992
- The Smashing Pumpkins played a release party for their 1995 album Mellon Collie and the Infinite Sadness the night before its release here.
- Blondie played at the theatre on August 14, 1999 as part of their 1999 comeback No Exit tour. Recordings of three songs from the concert - Under The Gun, No Exit, and Heart of Glass - were included on Blondie's 1999 Live album.
- Type O Negative performed with Moonspell and Cradle of Filth Grand Funk W/ Mother Root 2000, November 22, 2003 for their Life Is Killing Me album tour.
- Marilyn Manson performed at the theatre July 5, 2013 as part of their Hey Cruel World... Tour.
- Tame Impala performed at the theatre October 10, 2013 and the recordings were used for their live album Live Versions.
- The venue served as the opening night on Miley Cyrus' Milky Milky Milk Tour which was a very limited tour with only 8 cities across North America. The show sold out within a few minutes with one fixed price of US$69.69.
- Chlöe performed at the theatre on April 11, 2023 for the opening night of her highly-anticipated In Pieces Tour.
- Devo performed to a sold out 93XRT concert crowd on May 11, 2024.
