= Treat Me =

Single by Chlöe
- Released: April 8, 2022
- Recorded: 2021
- Genre: R&B; hip hop
- Length: 2:29
- Label: Parkwood
- Songwriters: Chloe Bailey; Caroline Ailin
- Composers: Warren Felder; Keith Sorrells; Alex Niceforo; Deongelo Holmes; Eric Jackson; Michael Crooms; Warren Mathis
- Producers: Oak; Sorrells; Nice; Bailey

Chlöe singles chronology
| "Have Mercy" (2021) | "Treat Me" (2022) | "Surprise" (2022) |

Music video
- "Treat Me" on YouTube

"Treat Me" is a song by American singer Chlöe. It was released on April 8, 2022, through Parkwood Entertainment.

== Background and release ==
In 2021, Bailey released her debut solo single, "Have Mercy", which reached number one on the Mainstream R&B/Hip-Hop Airplay chart and debuted within the top 40 of the Billboard Hot 100. Bailey provided vocals on "You & Me" by Gunna, from the album DS4Ever before she started to promote her next single. Bailey hinted at the release of "Treat Me" with a promotional video, showing the singer vocalizing in a bodysuit with crystals.

On March 31, 2022, Bailey announced the release date of "Treat Me", stating that the single would come out on April 8, through Parkwood Entertainment. The cover artwork for the song depicts the singer in a latex thong and an up-sized black puffer jacket. Her hair consists of sleek bangs, and she wears jewelry around her neck which goes down to her chest area. The song was Bailey's first release of 2022.

== Composition ==
The hook of "Treat Me" contains a sample from "Ms. New Booty", a 2005 song by Bubba Sparxxx and the Ying Yang Twins. The song was produced by Oak. Bailey wrote "Treat Me" while in the process of exiting a relationship. The song contains themes of pride and power.

== Critical reception ==
In a review of Chlöe's debut album In Pieces, Pitchfork's Heven Haile wrote that "the forced strut of her delivery and unimaginative 'Ms. New Booty' sample made 'Treat Me' feel optimized for mainstream radio", characterizing the singer's solo material as "manufactured to the point of sterility."

== Music video ==
The music video for "Treat Me", directed by Diana Kunst, begins with Bailey standing in the middle of the frame, wearing a leather suit as lights flash in the background. After this, the singer dances beside a leopard. The video is inspired by Grace Jones and Janet Jackson. William Ylvisaker and Lukas van der Fecht designed some of the outfits used in the clip. The video's production was handled by Christopher Lopez. The executive producers are Justin Benoliel, Amanda Leya Andrews, and Jill Kaplan. Creative direction is provided by Andrew Makadsi of Parkwood.

== Credits ==
Credits adapted from Spotify.

- Chloe Bailey – performer, songwriter
- Warren Felder – songwriter, producer
- Keith Sorrells – songwriter
- Caroline Ailin – songwriter
- Deonjelo Holmes – songwriter
- Eric Jackson – songwriter
- Michael Crooms – songwriter
- Warren Mathis – songwriter

== Charts ==
Weekly chart performance for "Treat Me"
| Chart (2022) | Peak position |
|---|---|
| New Zealand Hot Singles (RMNZ) | 19 |
| South Africa Streaming (TOSAC) | 72 |
| US Billboard Hot 100 | 81 |
| US Hot R&B/Hip-Hop Songs (Billboard) | 27 |
