= How Does It Feel (Chlöe song) =

Single by Chlöe featuring Chris Brown

from the album In Pieces
- Released: February 24, 2023
- Genre: R&B; soul
- Length: 2:47
- Label: Parkwood; Columbia
- Lyricists: Chris Brown; Racquelle Anteola
- Producers: Hitmaka; Cardiak

Chlöe singles chronology
"Pray It Away" (2023)	"How Does It Feel" (2023)	"Body Do" (2023)

Chris Brown singles chronology
"See Through Love" (2023)	"How Does It Feel" (2023)	"Don't Give It Away" (2023)

Music video
- "How Does It Feel" on YouTube

"How Does It Feel" is a song by American singer Chlöe, featuring Chris Brown. It was released as the second single from her debut solo studio album In Pieces, on February 24, 2023, through Parkwood Entertainment and Columbia Records.

== Music video ==
The music video for "How Does It Feel" was directed by Arrad, and released alongside the song.

== Accolades ==
Accolades for "How Does It Feel"
Year	Ceremony	Award	Result	Ref.
2023	MTV Video Music Awards	Best R&B	Nominated	

== Charts ==
Chart performance for "How Does It Feel"
Chart (2023)	Peak position
New Zealand Hot Singles (RMNZ)	5
UK Singles Chart Update (OCC)	98
US Bubbling Under Hot 100 (Billboard)	10
US Hot R&B/Hip-Hop Songs (Billboard)	47
