= The Novo =

Club in Los Angeles

Coordinates: 34.044766°N 118.265464°W

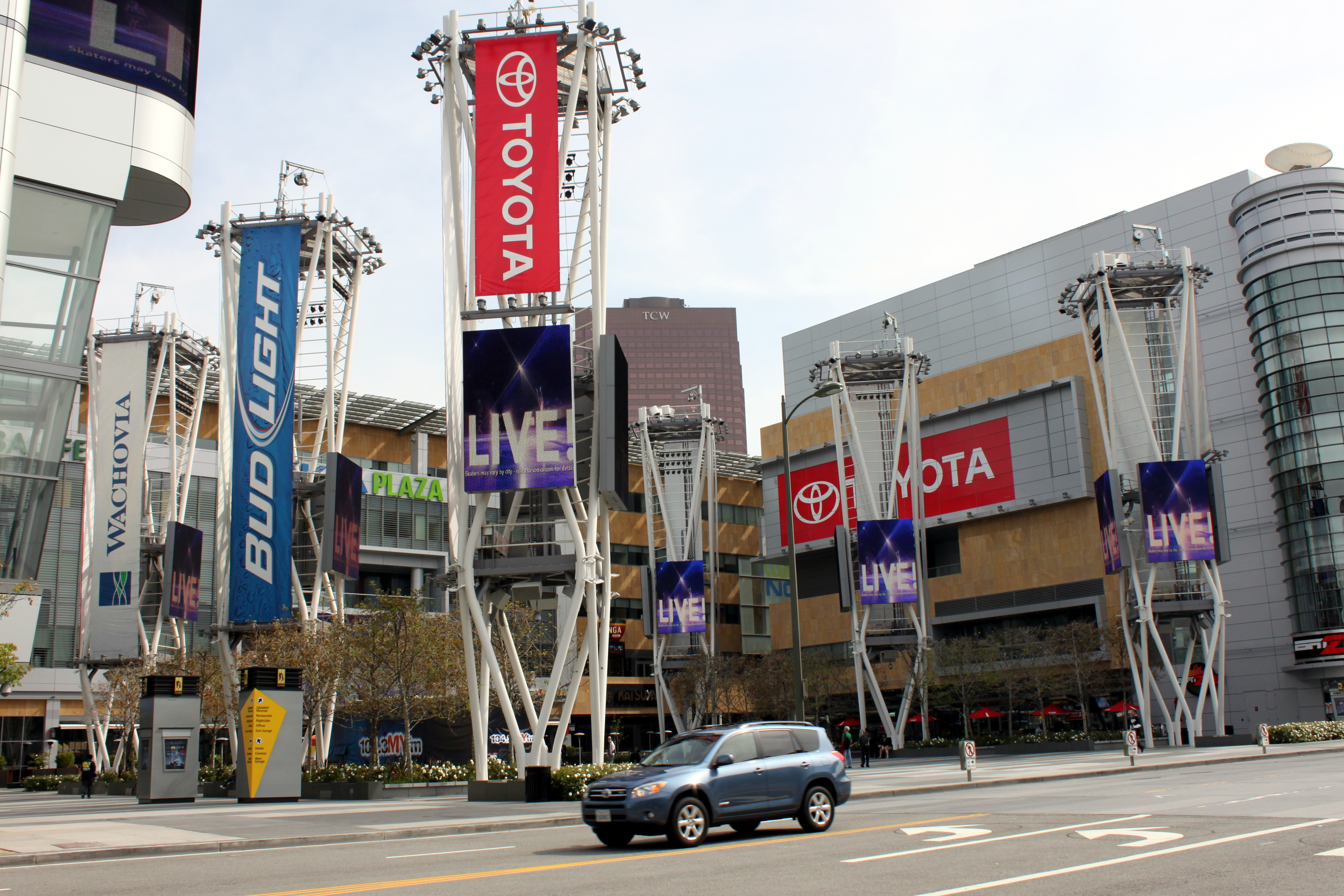
- Interactive map of The Novo
- Full name: The Novo
- Former names: Club Nokia (2008-16)
- Address: 800 W Olympic Blvd; Los Angeles, California 90015-1360
- Location: South Park, Downtown Los Angeles
- Owner: Anschutz Entertainment Group
- Operator: Goldenvoice
- Capacity: 2,400

Construction
- Groundbreaking: September 5, 2005
- Opened: November 8, 2008
- Cost: $80 million
- Architects: Gensler; Batay-Csorba
- Project manager: Faithful+Gould
- Structural engineer: Nabih Youssef & Associates
- General contractor: PCL Construction Services

Website
- Venue Website

The Novo (formerly Club Nokia) is an indoor club located at L.A. Live in downtown Los Angeles, California. The club's seating capacity is 2,400.

== History ==
The venue opened on November 8, 2008, as "Club Nokia" with shows held by the musician Beck over the first two nights. Its name was changed in March 2016, several months after the neighboring Nokia Theater's name was changed to the Microsoft Theater. The theater continues to be booked by Goldenvoice.

=== Name ===
- Club Nokia (November 8, 2008—March 10, 2016)
- The Novo (March 11, 2016—present)

== Concerts ==
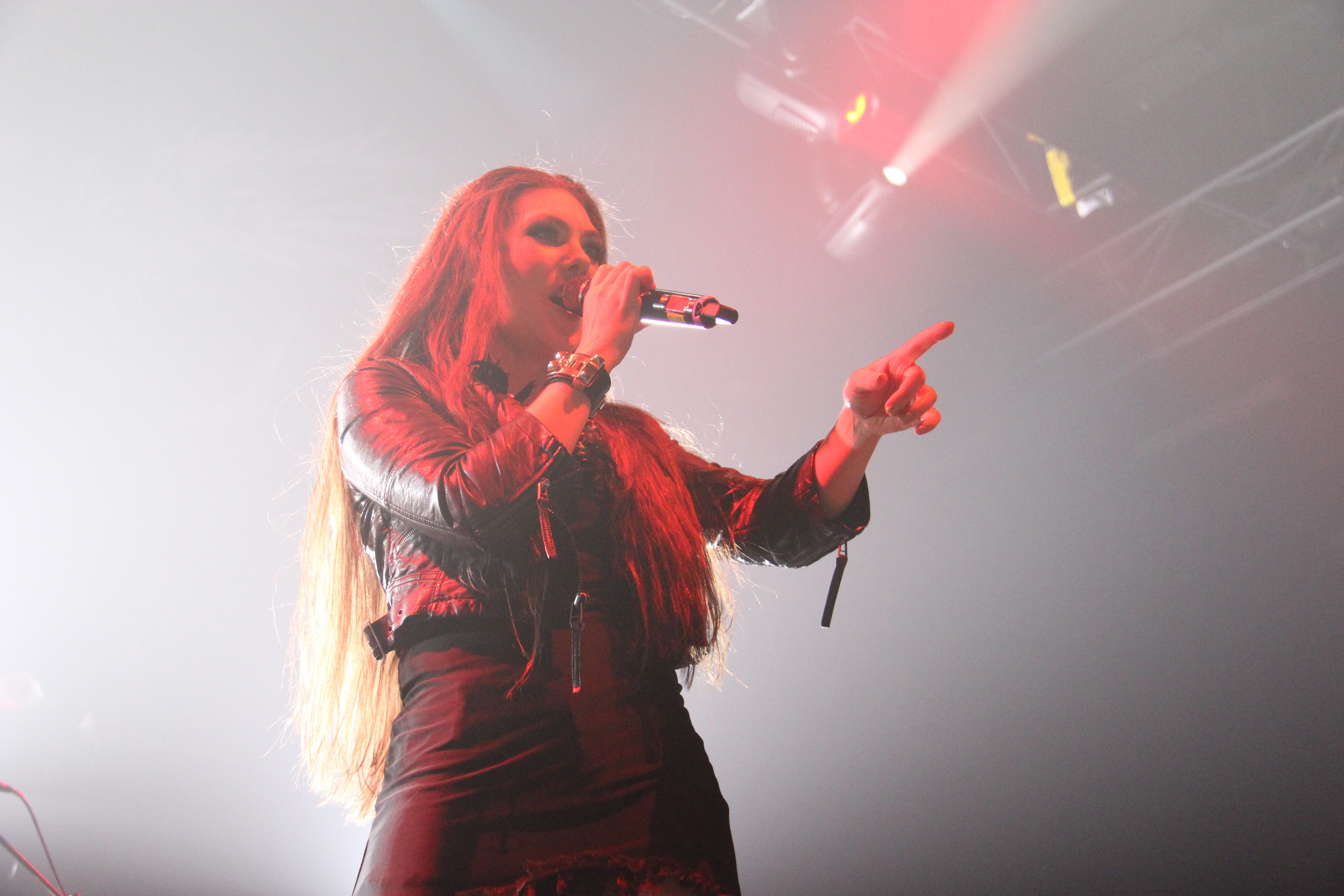
Elize Ryd performing at Club Nokia in 2014

Date	Artist/Event	Tour	Attendance	Revenue
November 8, 2008	Beck	—	—	—
November 9, 2008	Beck	—	—	—
November 12, 2008	Lupe Fiasco	—	—	—
February 25, 2011	Miranda Cosgrove	Dancing Crazy Tour	1,254 / 1,254	$54,660
March 26, 2011	Seth MacFarlane	—	—	—
June 8, 2011	Crush 40; Alex Makhlouf	Sonic Boom 2011	—	—
December 2, 2011	The Dan Band	—	—	—
February 8, 2012	Coldplay	Mylo Xyloto Tour	—	—
March 30, 2012	The Dan Band	—	—	—
May 18, 2012	The Dan Band	—	—	—
September 23, 2012	Demi Lovato	A Special Night with Demi Lovato	—	—
October 20, 2012	The Dan Band	—	—	—
July 19, 2013	The Dan Band	—	—	—
September 9, 2013	Ariana Grande	The Listening Sessions Tour	2,351 / 2,351	$88,736
January 11, 2014	Linkin Park, The Offspring, Bad Religion, Heart, The Filharmonic, Mike Einziger, Travis Barker	Music for Relief		
February 1, 2014	The Dan Band	—	—	—
December 19, 2014	The Dan Band	—	—	—
January 29, 2015	Jackie Evancho	Awakening: Live in Concert	—	—
February 20, 2015	Kalin and Myles	The Dedication Tour	—	—
February 28, 2015	Bo Burnham	Make Happy Tour	—	—
March 1, 2015	Fifth Harmony, Mahogany Lox; Jasmine V, Jacob Whitesides	Reflection Tour	2,351 / 2,351	$73,950
March 20, 2015	Lavell Crawford	—	788 / 1,515	$22,593
March 26, 2015	Boyz II Men	—	888 / 1,858	$50,228
March 27, 2015	Jazmine Sullivan	—	1,533 / 2,300	$52,440
April 16, 2015	Azealia Banks	—	2,341 / 2,341	$60,564
May 18, 2015	Jessie J, Luke James	Sweet Talker Tour	2,357 / 2,357	$94,435
May 30, 2015	Ciara	Jackie Tour	1,453 / 2,405	$44,288
June 11, 2015	Alan Parsons	—	850 / 1,434	$39,835
June 26, 2015	Miguel	—	—	—
July 26, 2015	BTS	2015 BTS Live Trilogy Episode II: The Red Bullet	—	—
October 13, 2015	Young Thug, Playboi Carti, Aston Matthews	—	—	—
October 15, 2015	The 2015 Geekie Awards	—	—	—
October 24, 2015	Bianca Del Rio	Rolodex of Hate	—	—
January 9, 2016	Apink	Pink Memory: A Pink North American Tour 2016	—	—
January 30, 2016	Seshollowaterboyz	—	—	—
February 12, 2016	Beats Antique, Lettuce (band), Lafa Taylor	—	1,202 / 2,356	$40,283
February 26, 2016	Tyga	—	1,754 / 2,356	$46,591
March 11, 2016	Waka Flocka Flame, Robb Banks	—	2,356 / 2,356	$23,560
March 16, 2016	Young Thug	—	2,356 / 2,356	$75,415
March 18, 2016	Hopsin	—	2,155 / 2,356	$21,150
March 25, 2016	Migos	—	1,640 / 2,356	$42,308
April 22, 2016	King Lil G	—	—	—
July 10, 2016	GOT7	Fly Tour	—	—
June 16, 2016	The Pharcyde	—	—	
June 22, 2016	Buckethead	—	—	
September 2, 2016	Killswitch Engage	—	—	—
June 6, 2017	XXXTentacion	The Revenge Tour	—	—
July 3, 2017	Asian Kung-Fu Generation	Asian Kung-Fu Generation 2017 World Tour (Anime Expo 2017)	—	—
July 23 — 24, 2017	Monsta X	Beautiful World Tour	—	—
November 18, 2018	Day6	First World Tour "Youth"	—	—
May 24, 2019	TXT	TOMORROW X TOGETHER SHOWCASE: STAR in US	—	—
July 5–6, 2019	Aqours	Love Live! Sunshine!! Aqours World Love Live in LA ~Brand New Wave~ (Anime Expo 2019	—	—
November 4, 2019	Jay Park	SEXY 4EVA World Tour	—	—
January 17, 2020	Itzy	Itzy Premiere Showcase Tour "ITZY? ITZY!"	—	—
July 22, 2022	(G)I-dle	Just Me ( )I-dle World Tour	—	—
May 3, 2023	Chlöe	In Pieces Tour	—	—
July 2, 2023	Mili; Cö shu Nie	Anime Expo 2023	—	—
November 5, 2023	Tini	Tini Tour	—	—
May 17, 2024	Panchiko	North America Tour 2024	—	—
July 6, 2024	TubeOut!	Anime Expo 2024	—	—
December 3–4, 2024	Kiss of Life	Kiss Road	—	—
July 5, 2025	TubeOut!	Anime Expo 2025	—	—
August 23, 2025	Clipse	Let God Sort Em Out Tour	—	
April 18, 2026	Insane Clown Posse; Juggalo Championship Wrestling	—	—	—

== See also ==
- Peacock Theater
- L.A. Live
- List of music venues in Los Angeles
- List of music venues
