= For the Night (Chlöe song) =

Single by Chlöe featuring Latto
- Released: October 28, 2022
- Recorded: October 2021
- Genre: R&B; pop-soul; hip hop
- Length: 3:25
- Label: Parkwood; Columbia
- Composers: London Holmes; Omer Fedi; Aubrey Robinson; Peter Lee Johnson; Jerome Monroe; Antonio Williams; Quintin Q Gulledge
- Lyricists: Chloe Bailey; Alyssa Stephens; Nija Charles
- Producers: London on da Track; Omer Fedi; Boobie; Peter Lee Johnson; Slimwav; Tone Deaf; Quintin Q Gulledge

Chlöe singles chronology
"Surprise" (2022)	"For the Night" (2022)	"Pray It Away" (2023)

Latto singles chronology
"Pussy" (2022)	"For the Night" (2022)	"FTCU" (2022)

Music video
- "For the Night" on YouTube

"For the Night" is a song by American singer Chlöe featuring American rapper Latto. It was released as a single on October 28, 2022, through Parkwood Entertainment and Columbia Records.

== Background and release ==
Chlöe first previewed the song on May 18, during an Instagram Live along with tracks "Surprise" and "Cheat Back". The release of "For the Night" follows Chlöe's cover of "Freak Like Me" by Adina Howard. On September 24, 2022, she debuted the song at the 2022 iHeartRadio Music Festival. The singer revealed that it would feature Latto on October 24.

== Composition ==
"For the Night" was produced by London on da Track. On October 1, during a Twitter Space, she revealed to fans that the song was written about American rapper and collaborator Gunna.

== Music video ==
American comedian Druski co-stars in the song's music video alongside Chlöe. The singer shared a teaser of the video on October 18.

== Charts ==
Chart performance for "For the Night"
Chart (2022)	Peak position
New Zealand Hot Singles (RMNZ)	35
US Bubbling Under Hot 100 (Billboard)	25
