= In Pieces (Chlöe album) =

2023 studio album by Chlöe

Studio album by Chlöe
- Released: March 31, 2023
- Genres: R&B; pop; trap
- Length: 37:20
- Labels: Parkwood; Columbia
- Producers: Chlöe; 2300; Alex Hope; BoogzDaBeast; Cardiak; Chanelbigs; David x Eli; Ecasssh; FnZ; Hitmaka; Jakik; Jeff Gitelman; John Ho; Josh Taffel; Linden Jay; Metro Boomin; Mikky Ekko; P2J; Pitt tha Kid; Puredandy; Scott Bridgeway; ThankGod4Cody; The-Dream; UPNORTH

Chlöe chronology
| In Pieces (2023) | Trouble in Paradise (2024) |

Singles from In Pieces
- 1. "Pray It Away" Released: January 27, 2023; 2. "How Does It Feel" Released: February 24, 2023; 3. "Body Do" Released: March 24, 2023; 4. "In Pieces" Released: March 29, 2023

In Pieces is the debut solo studio album by American singer-songwriter Chlöe. It was released through Parkwood Entertainment and Columbia Records on March 31, 2023.

== Background ==
My sister went to London to film her movie for seven or eight months, and it was so hard being without her. That is when I started creating my project. I found my confidence – like, "OK, you can do this now." I always have my sister's support, and she will always have mine, no matter what we do together or individually.

— Chlöe, speaking to Billboard in 2021.

After eight years of releasing music under duo act Chloe x Halle, Chlöe began recording music for a solo project in late 2019. This was put on hold so that she and her sister could focus on promoting their critically acclaimed album, Ungodly Hour (2020).

In January 2021, the sisters created separate Instagram accounts after having shared one for nine years under the Chloe x Halle name. Halle was away from Chlöe for many months during this time, filming the 2023 live action adaptation of The Little Mermaid abroad after landing the lead role. This was one of the longest periods they'd ever been apart. Chlöe took to creating music by herself as a form of therapy. She started recording under the impression it would make part of Chloe x Halle's third album, but the music ultimately evolved into the groundwork for a solo project.

Chlöe called the album "90% done" when speaking to Billboard in August 2021. She then revealed that she had been working on her debut album throughout the pandemic and that it would be self-titled. Then, in March 2022, she announced via Twitter that the album was complete. On March 16, she revealed the album cover art, which is a recreation of a porcelain doll holding her heart in her hand that Bailey had seen 3 years prior.

== Promotion ==
On January 24, the singer announced her upcoming debut album with a short teaser video, previewing the song "Heart on My Sleeve". In the video, Chlöe wears "a sleek red leather gown, acting as a scale as she holds a human heart on one arm and a sphere on the other." Chlöe had originally chosen for the album to be self-titled but reworked the name to In Pieces because the music had "change[d] and it felt more vulnerable and raw." The album was released on March 31, 2023, with the release date officially being announced with another teaser video, previewing yet another snippet of "Heart on My Sleeve. Speaking to Complex in January, she said "every single song on [the] project stems from my own experiences" and that fans could look forward to "exciting features and collaborations."

On February 21, 2023, Beats Electronics released a commercial for a color collection of the Beats Fit Pro, premiering one of the upcoming songs from Chlöe's album "Body Do". On March 28, 2023, Chlöe performed then-unreleased track "Cheatback" on Jimmy Kimmel Live!.

=== Singles ===
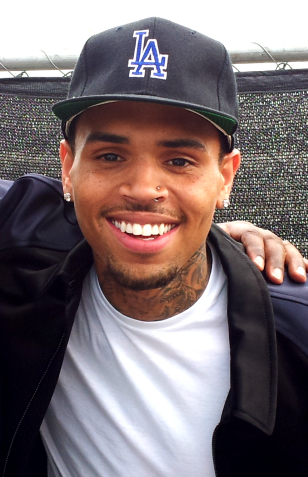
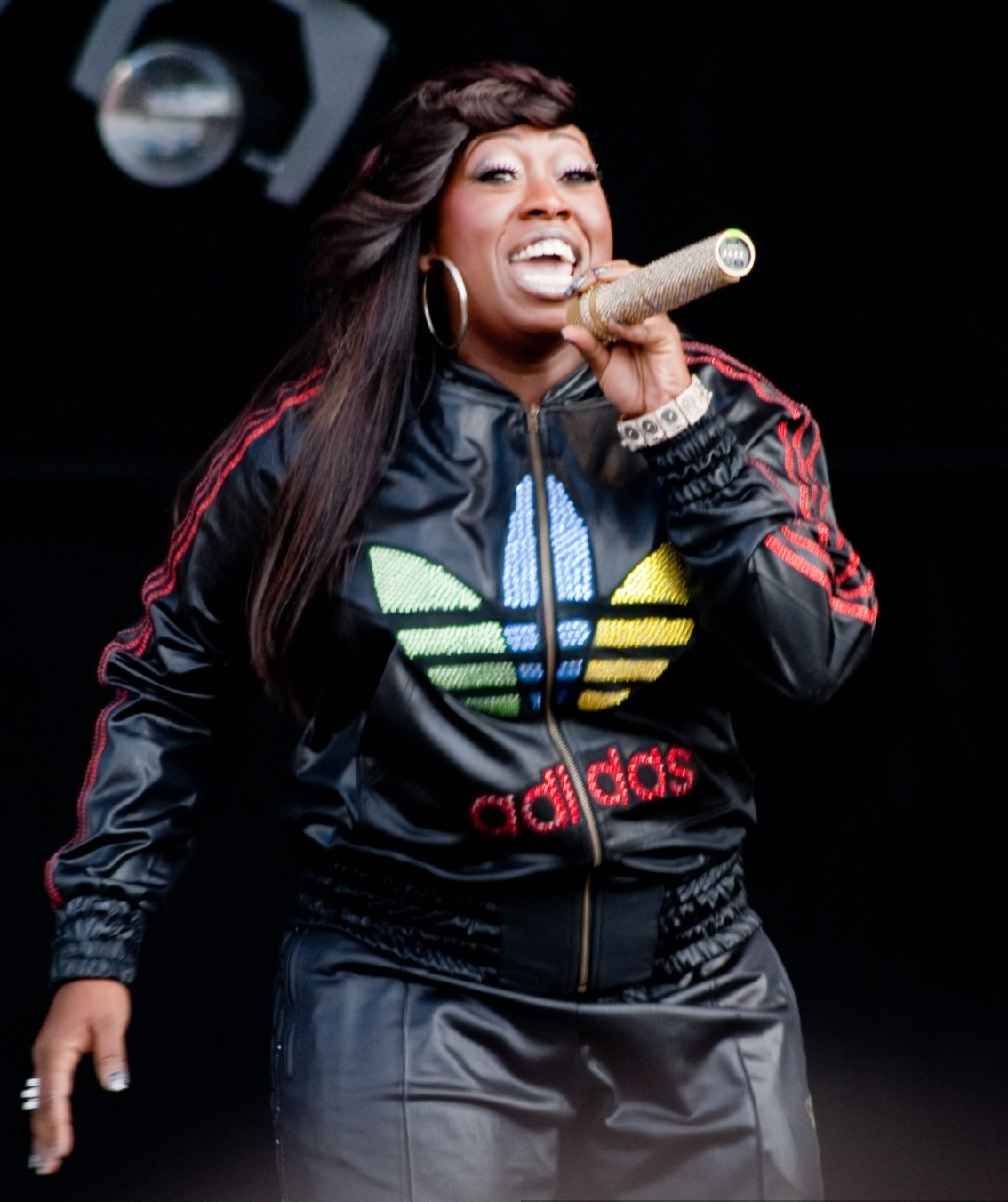
Chris Brown (left) and Missy Elliott (right) are two of the artists that worked with Chlöe on the album.

Between September 2021 and October 2022, Chlöe released four singles intended for her debut album: "Have Mercy", "Treat Me", "Surprise", and "For the Night". These were announced as scrapped from the album following the release of "Pray It Away", the new lead single from the album. She later explained that the album had evolved past the sound of the previous singles.

After her recent album announcement, she teased an upcoming single through social media. The lead single "Pray It Away" was released on January 27, 2023, alongside a music video. The song is co-produced by the artist herself, ThankGod4Cody, ECassshh, Pitt Tha Kid, and Puredandy. The music video is directed by Madeline Kate Kann. The second single "How Does It Feel", featuring Chris Brown, was released on February 24, 2023, along with an accompanying music video. The third single "Body Do" was released on March 24, 2023, exactly a week before the album's release as a single. The title track was released two days before the album as its fourth single on March 29, 2023, with a music video. On March 31, "Cheatback" featuring Future received a music video.

== Critical reception ==
Professional ratings
Aggregate scores
| Source | Rating |
|---|---|
| Metacritic | 62/100 |
Review scores
| Source | Rating |
| Beats Per Minute | 74% |
| Clash | 7/10 |
| The Guardian | 3/5 stars |
| NME | 3/5 stars |
| Pitchfork | 6.1/10 |
| Rolling Stone | 3/5 stars |

In Pieces was met generally favourable reviews from the music critics, At Metacritic, which assigns a normalized rating out of 100 to reviews from professional publications, In Pieces received an average score of 62, based on eight reviews, indicating "generally favorable reviews". Mosi Reeves of Rolling Stone described the album as a "fascinating albeit uneven listen", adding that Chlöe's "chosen a sound that's more reflective of her contemporaries — caustically self-aware and skeptical towards sexual relations yet buoyed by her songwriting talents and vocal performances. [...] Give her credit for trying to turn her growing pains into prickly, sometimes enjoyable art, even if the Pieces don't always match the overall effort." In a positive review, Clash's Shahzaib Hussain felt that Chlöe bridged "prayer with pop melodrama" and called In Pieces a "solid introduction" to her "R&B-pop oeuvre; an anxious, anguished and frenetically paced crossover project."

NME's Sophie Williams, in a mixed review, highlighted the "wild R&B innovation" of In Pieces' production, but felt it was "let down by missteps". She explains that at times, the album stands as a "fragmented version" of Chlöe's songwriting and producing talents, writing that although its songs often contained "flashes of brilliance", they did little to "brighten the ambiance" of the album. Echoing Williams' statements, Heven Haile of Pitchfork felt that the album's "generic songwriting and chemistry-free features" didn't support Chlöe's reputation as a "generational talent". She thought the "emotionally charged" and "conversational" interludes were out of place amid the "redundant themes and mind-numbingly online songwriting. It's like a choose-your-own-adventure with only two endings: There's a good-for-nothing man in her life who keeps betraying her, so will she A) give it to God or B) shake some ass and show him what he's missing?" Haile did, however, praised the "flirty and upbeat" standout single "Body Do", describing it as a "bumping dance track overlaid with ethereal falsettos" and a "convincing introduction to Chlöe the pop star."

== Track listing ==
In Pieces track listing
| No. | Title | Lyrics | Music | Producer(s) | Length |
|---|---|---|---|---|---|
| 1. | "Someone's Calling (Chlöe)" | Gus Kahn | Charles Daniels | Chlöe | 1:01 |
| 2. | "Pray It Away" | Bailey; Jocelyn Donald | Bailey; Cody Fayne; Eric Moore; Martin Alexander Pitt | Chlöe; ThankGod4Cody; Ecasssh; Pitt Tha Kid; Puredandy | 2:36 |
| 3. | "Body Do" | Bailey | Bailey; James Whitcombe; Linden Bascom, Jr. | Chlöe; 2300; Smokey Beats^{[c]} | 2:22 |
| 4. | "I Don't Mind" | Bailey | Bailey; Richard Isong | P2J; Chlöe | 2:57 |
| 5. | "Worried" | Bailey; Feli Ferraro | Leland Wayne; David Ruoff; Elias Klughammer | Metro Boomin; David x Eli | 2:47 |
| 6. | "Fallin 4 U" | Bailey; Shermay Barnes | Ruchaun Akers, Jr.; Jake Wogan; Aidan Crotinger | Scott Bridgeway; Jakik | 0:52 |
| 7. | "How Does It Feel" (with Chris Brown) | Chris Brown; Racquelle Anteola | Bailey; Brian Holland; Lamont Dozier; Edward Holland; Richard Wylie; Christian Ward | Hitmaka; Cardiak | 2:47 |
| 8. | "Feel Me Cry" | Alana Chenevert; Denisia Andrews; Brittany Coney | John Ho | Ho; Chlöe | 3:29 |
| 9. | "Make It Look Easy" | Bailey | Bailey; Anders Christiansen; Kasper Knudsen; Nicolai Andersen; Andreas Bigum | UpNorth; Chanelbigs; Chlöe | 2:57 |
| 10. | "Looze U" | Bailey; Terius Gesteelde-Diamant; LaLonne Gesteelde-Diamant | Bailey; T. Gesteelde-Diamant | The-Dream; Chlöe | 3:57 |
| 11. | "Told Ya" (featuring Missy Elliott) | Bailey; Theron Thomas; Melissa Elliott | Bailey; Jahmal Gwin; Michael Mule; Isaac De Boni; Daen Simmons; Calvin James Lewis | Chlöe; BoogzDaBeast; FnZ; Pyro Da God^{[c]} | 3:24 |
| 12. | "Cheatback" (featuring Future) | Bailey; Thomas | Bailey; Jeff Gitelman | Chlöe; Gitty | 3:45 |
| 13. | "Heart on My Sleeve" | Bailey | Bailey; Linden Berelowitz; Josh Taffel | Chlöe; Linden Jay; Taffel | 0:57 |
| 14. | "In Pieces" | Mikky Ekko; Alex Hope | Ekko; Hope | Ekko; Hope; Chlöe | 3:59 |
| Total length: | | | | | 37:20 |

Note

- ^{^[c]} signifies a co-producer

== Personnel ==
Musicians

- Chlöe – vocals (all tracks), choir (track 2)
- Claudia Cunningham – choir (2, 8, 9)
- Dwanna Orange – choir (2, 8, 9)
- Jenelle Dunkley – choir (2, 8, 9)
- Princess Fortier – choir (2, 8, 9)
- Princess Jones – choir (2, 8, 9)
- Derek Dixie – choir (2, 9)
- Jordan Shores – choir (2, 9)
- LaMarcus Eldridge – choir (2, 9)
- Michael Adkins – choir (2, 9)
- Gabrielle Davis – background vocals (3)
- Shermay Barnes – background vocals (4)
- Gabrielle Garo – flute, saxophone (4, 8, 11)
- Arnetta Johnson – trumpet (4, 8, 11)
- Oliver Taylor – trumpet (4, 8, 11)
- Ken Lewis – guitar (7)
- Adrienne Woods – strings (9)
- Bianca McClure – strings (9)
- Chelsea Gwizdala – strings (9)
- Marta Honer – strings (9)
- Rhea Hosanny – strings (9)
- Stephanie Matthews – strings (9)
- Stephanie Yu – strings (9)

Technical

- Colin Leonard – mastering
- Chris Godbey – mixing (1–6, 8–14), engineering (1, 8, 10, 13)
- Ethan Stevens – mixing, engineering (5)
- Jaycen Joshua – mixing (7)
- Shawn "Source" Jarrett – mixing, engineering (7)
- Simone Torres – engineering
- James Krausse – engineering (1)
- Lester Mendoza – engineering (2, 4, 8, 9, 11)
- David "Pac" Urresta – engineering (3, 6, 10)
- Patrizio "Teezio" Pigliapoco – engineering (7)
- Brandon Harding – engineering (10)
- Missy Elliott – engineering (11)
- Natalie D'Orlando – engineering (11)
- Vladimir Castor – engineering (11)
- Chlöe – engineering (12, 13); vocal production, executive production (all tracks)
- Rob Moreno – engineering assistance (1–4, 6–14)
- Ryan Prieur – engineering assistance (1, 3–6, 8–12, 14)
- Jules Everson – engineering assistance (2, 8, 9, 11)
- Patrick Gardner – engineering assistance (3, 9)
- Jeremy Dilli – engineering assistance (4, 10)
- Jonathan Lopez Garcia – engineering assistance (14)

== Charts ==
Chart performance for In Pieces
| Chart (2023) | Peak position |
|---|---|
| UK Album Downloads (Official Charts) | 59 |
| US Billboard 200 | 119 |
| US Top R&B Albums (Billboard) | 17 |

== Certifications ==
| Region | Certification | Certified units/sales |
|---|---|---|
| Brazil (Pro-Música Brasil) | Gold | 20,000^{‡} |
^{‡} Sales+streaming figures based on certification alone.

== Release history ==
In Pieces release history
| Region | Date | Format(s) | Edition | Label | Ref. |
|---|---|---|---|---|---|
| Various | March 31, 2023 | Digital download; streaming; CD | Standard | Parkwood; Columbia | |
