= Resurrection (mixtape) =

Mixtape by Chlöe & Timbaland
- Released: June 19, 2026
- Recorded: December 2025 - February 2026
- Genres: Alternative R&B; pop
- Length: 29:47
- Labels: Parkwood; Columbia
- Producers: Timbaland; Babe Truth; Filip Gunia; Hanz Beats; Jordan Mosley; Justin Mosley; Kavin; kidsmvrt; Lokey; T0BITURNUP; Vito

Chlöe chronology
Trouble in Paradise (2024)	Resurrection (2026)

Timbaland chronology
Timbo Progression (2025)	Resurrection (2026)	SEVEN TRUMPETS (2026)

Resurrection is a collaborative commercial mixtape by American singer-songwriter Chlöe and American producer Timbaland, released on June 19, 2026. The mixtape was entirely produced by Timbaland, with co-production from the likes of the Mosley Brothers (Justin and Jordan Mosley), kidsmvrt, Lokey and more.

== Background and promotion ==
In October 2025, Chlöe uploaded a video in collaboration with Timbaland, in which they created a short song together. The pair continued to tease new music, releasing a snippet of "Hold It" on January 31, 2026, and a snippet of a yet-to-be-released song on February 2; with both captions hinting at a larger project between the two musicians. The mixtape would officially be announced as Resurrection on June 8, 2026, with its trailer previewing a snippet of its opening track "Talking Dirty".

In an interview with news show Extra, Chlöe revealed the mixtape was created in the span of two months.

== Track listing ==
Resurrection track listing
No.	Title	Writer(s)	Producer(s)	Length
1.	"Talking Dirty"	Chloe Bailey; Timothy Mosley; Justin Mosley; Jordan Mosley; Cristian Luis Colón	Timbaland; Justin Mosley^{[c]}; Jordan Mosley^{[c]}; kidsmvrt^{[c]}	2:12
2.	"Hold It"	Bailey; Quiana Griffin; T. Mosley; Justin Mosley; Jordan Mosley; Colón	Timbaland; Justin Mosley^{[c]}; Jordan Mosley^{[c]}; kidsmvrt^{[c]}	2:01
3.	"Priorities"	Bailey; T. Mosley; Justin Mosley; Jordan Mosley; Colón; Oakay; Serenity Arce; Francisco Javier Bautista III; Lorena Dos Santos	Timbaland; Justin Mosley^{[c]}; Jordan Mosley^{[c]}; kidsmvrt^{[c]}; Babe Truth^{[u]}	3:19
4.	"World on Fire"	Bailey; T. Mosley; Santos; Colón	Timbaland; Lokey; kidsmvrt^{[c]}; T0BITURNUP^{[u]}; Vito^{[u]}	3:23
5.	"Caught"	Bailey; Griffin; T. Mosley; Justin Mosley; Jordan Mosley; Colón; Thomas Bråttvik; Filip Gunia	Timbaland; Justin Mosley^{[c]}; Jordan Mosley^{[c]}; kidsmvrt^{[c]}; Hanz^{[c]}; Gunia^{[c]}; Kavin^{[u]}	1:56
6.	"Sensitive"	Bailey; Eloise Keating; T. Mosley	Timbaland	1:10
7.	"Better Than She Can"	Bailey; T. Mosley	Timbaland	2:47
8.	"On Your Own"	Bailey; T. Mosley; Justin Mosley; Jordan Mosley	Timbaland; Justin Mosley^{[c]}; Jordan Mosley^{[c]}	1:51
9.	"Believer"	Bailey; Griffin; T. Mosley; Justin Mosley; Jordan Mosley; Colón	Timbaland; Justin Mosley^{[c]}; Jordan Mosley^{[c]}; kidsmvrt^{[c]}	1:21
10.	"Main Attraction"	Bailey; T. Mosley	Timbaland	1:42
11.	"Mama's Boy"	Bailey; T. Mosley; Justin Mosley; Jordan Mosley	Timbaland; Justin Mosley; Jordan Mosley	2:15
12.	"Belong to You"	Bailey; T. Mosley; Justin Mosley; Jordan Mosley; Colón	Timbaland; Justin Mosley; Jordan Mosley; kidsmvrt^{[c]}	2:24
13.	"Jittery"	Bailey; Griffin; T. Mosley	Timbaland	3:27
Total length:				29:47

Notes

- ^{^[c]} signifies a co-producer
- ^{^[u]} signifies an uncredited producer
