= Have Mercy (Chlöe song) =

2021 single by Chloë

Single by Chlöe
- Released: September 10, 2021
- Recorded: April 2021
- Genre: Pop rap; R&B
- Length: 2:29
- Label: Parkwood; Columbia
- Composers: Chloe Bailey; Shane Lindstrom; Jeremy McIntyre; Michael Mulé; Isaac De Boni; Tedra Wilson; Cherise Gary; Marquis Gasque
- Lyricists: Chloe Bailey; Theron Thomas; Nija Charles
- Producers: Murda Beatz; Chlöe; Joseph L'étranger; FnZ; BoogzDaBeast

Chlöe singles chronology
"Have Mercy" (2021)	"Treat Me" (2022)

Music video
- "Have Mercy" on YouTube

"Have Mercy" is the debut solo single by American singer Chlöe. It was released on September 10, 2021, after earning fame as part of R&B sister duo Chloe x Halle. Prior to its release, a snippet of the song went viral on TikTok. It was written by Chlöe, Theron Thomas, and Nija Charles, and was produced by Murda Beatz, Chlöe, Joseph L'étranger, FnZ and BoogzDaBeast.

Positively reviewed by critics, "Have Mercy" debuted at number 28 on the Billboard Hot 100 chart and at number 10 on the Hot R&B/Hip-Hop Songs chart. Musically, the song is an uptempo song, with music critic Kyle Denis describing it as a "raucous and joyous ode to large derrières". A music video directed by Karena Evans was released alongside the song itself, and stars Chlöe as the head of a sorority full of gorgons who seduce men in order to turn them into stone. She gave her debut live performance of the song at the 2021 MTV Video Music Awards, which earned praise from critics.

== Background and release ==
Prior to releasing "Have Mercy", Chlöe found fame performing alongside her sister as part of the R&B duo Chloe x Halle. In 2021, the two embarked on solo careers, with Halle starring in the 2023 film The Little Mermaid, and Chlöe releasing covers of popular songs on social media. On July 1, 2021, Chlöe's 23rd birthday, she teased "Have Mercy" by posting a TikTok video of her dancing and twerking on a bed to a snippet of the song, with the caption "This is 23… HAVE MERCY". The snippet went viral and was used in over 8,000,000 videos on the platform.

Promotional photos for the single, taken by Edwig Stenson (who also did Chlöe's makeup for the photos) were released on August 24. She revealed the release date and cover art for the song, the latter of which depicts Chlöe in a revealing outfit, on September 6. "Have Mercy" was released on September 10, 2021, as Chlöe's debut solo single, and as the lead single from her debut album.

== Composition ==
"Have Mercy" was produced by Canadian record producer Murda Beatz with Chlöe, Joseph L'étranger, FnZ and BoogzDaBeast, and its uptempo, bass-heavy beat is built around a sample of the Jersey club and Baltimore club song "Off the Chain" by TT the Artist and Uniiqu3. It was written by the song's producers along with Marquis Gasque, Theron Thomas, and Nija Charles. It is an upbeat song that Chlöe described as pop, with boastful lyrics that focus on Chlöe's buttocks and curvaceous figure and men's infatuation with her.

== Critical reception ==
Jessica McKinney of Complex called Chlöe "hypnotizing" on "Have Mercy", and wrote that the song "boasts major sex appeal". Teen Vogue's Jazmine Denise wrote that Chlöe "came out swinging" with "Have Mercy", calling it a "spicy anthem". Billboard's Andrew Unterberger called the song a "booty anthem for the ages". Margaret Farrell of Flood Magazine wrote that the song, which she called "seductive" and "confident", is "beaming with sexual autonomy and next-level bravado" and "overflowing with nods to her mentor Mrs. Beyoncé Giselle Knowles-Carter". Jandrew Johnson of The Afro Desk complimented Chloe's songwriting ability, adding that she "truly understands how to write a hit single".

In a review of Chlöe's debut album In Pieces, Pitchfork's Heven Haile compared "Have Mercy" to Beyoncé's performance of "Crazy in Love" at the 2003 BET Awards, writing that the song "aspired to a similar 'debuting on top of a neon sign of her name' moment, but landed like a song from the Empire soundtrack—'body language like speaking Spanglish' is something Lucious Lyon would come up with."

== Music video ==
The music video for "Have Mercy" was directed by Karena Evans and filmed in late July 2021. The video was released on the same day as the song. Largely inspired by 1990s teen films, it stars Chlöe as the head of a sorority house full of undercover gorgons who seduce a group of fraternity brothers and turn them into stone. It was compared by critics to the story of Medusa.

The video features several dance sequences, and also stars Rome Flynn as Chlöe's main love interest, a 21-year-old man who goes missing after being turned to stone by her, Bree Runway as a sorority sister who spanks one of the fraternity brothers (played by Mark Young) who is dressed only in a jockstrap, and Tina Knowles as a sorority house mother. Throughout the video, Chlöe wears a number of different oufits, including a pink plaid blazer with hot pants, square sunglasses, and a diamond choker, as well as another outfit made up of a matching pink bralette and short shorts with socks and heeled sandals. One of the outfits in the video includes a gold jacket originally worn by Diana Ross in a 1981 Vogue spread. Ann Powers of NPR compared Chlöe's role in the video to that of Aaliyah in the 2002 film Queen of the Damned.

Chlöe's blonde dreadlocks in the video were styled by Kari Williams, Tinisha Meeks, Brittny Chere, and Jehcara Nelson. Her outfits were styled by Zerina Akers.

=== Reception ===
Bianca Betancourt of Harper's Bazaar wrote that the video for "Have Mercy" proved that Chlöe was "Beyoncé's ultimate protégé", calling the choreography "high-power" and "sultry" and the outfits "standout ensembles". NPR's Ann Powers described the video's premise as "a sweet flip of horrifically common frat party #metoo narratives" and added that Chlöe's dancing "might cause Normani to sweat".

French music channel Trace Urban broadcast it with a warning "-10" in September 2021 due to the sexual content and twerk scenes.

In response to fans who questioned Chlöe's decision to wear revealing clothing in the video, she stated, "It's my body, and I'm so proud of it."

== Commercial performance ==
"Have Mercy" debuted at number 28 on the Billboard Hot 100 and at number 10 on Billboard's Hot R&B/Hip-Hop Songs chart. In January 2022, the song was certified gold by the RIAA.

== Live performances ==
Chlöe's debut performance of "Have Mercy" took place at the 2021 MTV Video Music Awards in September 2021, where she was introduced by her sister Halle Bailey. The performance was prefaced by Chlöe standing in a red cape, operatically and repeatedly singing her own name before screaming and tearing off the cape. During the performance, she energetically danced and twerked in a hot pink leotard and ankle boots, accompanied by male backup dancers in varsity jackets, while the song's lyrics flashed on the screen behind her. She ended it by licking the microphone and smacking her buttocks. After the performance was over, she left the stage and cried.

The performance received praise from Simone Biles. Bianca Betancourt of Harper's Bazaar wrote that the performance "did not disappoint" and "shut down the VMA's stage", while Essence's Brooklyn White described it as "electrifying" and wrote that Chlöe "served fashion, face, choreo and vocals". USA Today's Melissa Ruggieri wrote that Chlöe's "sassy" performance "showcased how much she has learned from mentor Beyoncé as she imbued her performance with drama, twerking and most importantly, actual vocal talent". Billboard's Heran Mamo ranked the performance the second-best of the night, writing that Chlöe "made her mark on the VMAs stage" and called the choreography "tectonic plate-shifting". BET regarded her performance as "one of the most memorable of the night". Ellise Shafer of Variety wrote that the performance's dance break "proved [Chlöe] has the chops to be a true triple threat", and Adrian Horton of The Guardian referred to her live vocals as "impressive" and remarked that the performance was one of several that were "daring" and "high on sex appeal". BBC News's Mark Savage also praised her vocals as "flawless" and the choreography as "whip-crack", adding that she "tore up the stage". Vulture's Charu Sinha called her vocals "flawless" and the choreography "complicated", writing that she "commanded the VMAs stage with such obvious star power that it kind of rendered the night's other performances embarrassing by comparison". Chlöe also injured her shoulder during the performance.

== Credits and personnel ==
Credits adapted from Tidal.

- Chlöe – lead vocals, production
- Murda Beatz – background vocals, production, drums, bass, sampler, programming
- Boogz – production
- FNZ – production
- Joseph L'étranger – production
- Chris Godbey – mixing
- Colin Leonard – mastering
- James Krausse – recording
- Jason "Cheese" Goldberg – recording
- John Lowell Anderson – recording

== Charts ==
=== Weekly charts ===
Weekly chart performance for "Have Mercy"
Chart (2021–2022)	Peak position
Canada (Canadian Hot 100)	87
Canada CHR/Top 40 (Billboard)	36
Global 200 (Billboard)	45
Greece (IFPI)	8
Ireland (IRMA)	86
New Zealand Hot Singles (RMNZ)	15
Portugal (AFP)	101
South Africa (RISA)	3
UK Singles (Official Charts)	72
UK Hip Hop/R&B (Official Charts)	3
US Billboard Hot 100	28
US Hot R&B/Hip-Hop Songs (Billboard)	10
US Hot R&B Songs (Billboard)	3
US Mainstream Top 40 (Billboard)	19
US R&B/Hip-Hop Airplay (Billboard)	4
US Rhythmic (Billboard)	3

=== Year-end charts ===
2021 year-end chart performance for "Have Mercy"
Chart (2021)	Position
US Hot R&B/Hip-Hop Songs (Billboard)	9

2022 year-end chart performance for "Have Mercy"
Chart (2022)	Position
US Hot R&B/Hip-Hop Songs (Billboard)	5
US Rhythmic (Billboard)	2

== Certifications ==
Certifications for "Have Mercy"
Region	Certification	Certified units/sales
Canada (Music Canada)	Gold	40,000^{‡}
United States (RIAA)	Platinum	1,000,000^{‡}
^{‡} Sales+streaming figures based on certification alone.

== Release history ==
Release dates and formats for "Have Mercy"
Region	Date	Format	Label	Ref.
Various	September 10, 2021	Digital download; streaming	Parkwood; Columbia	
United States	September 21, 2021	Rhythmic contemporary radio	Parkwood; Columbia	
United States	November 2, 2021	Contemporary hit radio	Parkwood; Columbia	
