= Chloe Bailey =

American singer (born 1998)

- Bailey in 2026
- Born: Chloe Elizabeth Bailey; July 1, 1998 (age 28); Atlanta, Georgia, U.S.
- Other name: Chlöe
- Occupations: Singer-songwriter; actress; record producer
- Years active: 2003–present
- Relatives: Halle Bailey (sister); Charlamagne tha God (cousin)
- Musical career
- Origin: Mableton, Georgia, U.S.
- Genres: R&B; pop
- Instruments: Vocals; piano; keyboards
- Labels: Parkwood; Columbia
- Member of: Chloe x Halle
- Website: chloebailey.net

Chloe Elizabeth Bailey (born July 1, 1998), stylized as Chlöe, is an American singer-songwriter, record producer, and actress. She rose to prominence alongside her sister Halle Bailey as Chloe x Halle. The duo released two studio albums, with their second, Ungodly Hour (2020), being met with widespread acclaim upon release. In 2021, Bailey released her debut solo single "Have Mercy", which was certified platinum in the U.S. Her debut album, In Pieces, was released in 2023. Her second studio album, Trouble in Paradise, was released in 2024.

Bailey also starred in several television series and films, including Grown-ish (2018–2022) and Swarm (2023). She won an NAACP Image Award for her lead role in Praise This.

== Early life ==
Chloe Elizabeth Bailey was born on July 1, 1998 in Atlanta, and raised in Mableton, Georgia, with her older sister Ski Bailey (born 1991), younger sister Halle Bailey (born 2000) and younger brother Branson Bailey (born 2005), moving together to Los Angeles in mid-2012. While in Georgia, she played minor acting roles in films, including The Fighting Temptations (2003), starring Beyoncé, and the Disney television film Let It Shine (2012). Their father taught them how to write songs starting at the age of 8.

== Career ==
=== Career beginnings, Chloe X Halle ===
The sisters launched a YouTube channel at the ages of 13 and 11 respectively, with a cover of Beyoncé's "Best Thing I Never Had". They first performed as Chloe x Halle when uploading covers of pop songs onto this channel. The duo made their talk show debut when they appeared on The Ellen Show in April 2012. In September 2013, she made a cameo appearance in the Disney series Austin & Ally performing the song "Unstoppable". In 2015, she and her sister signed to Parkwood Entertainment.

Chloe x Halle made their professional debut with the EP, Sugar Symphony, which was released under Parkwood on April 29, 2016. The duo were also featured as the opening act for the European part of Beyoncé's Formation World Tour, held between late June and early August 2016.

Nearly a year after, Chloe x Halle released a mixtape, The Two of Us, on March 16, 2017, on YouTube. It was featured on Rolling Stone magazine's Best R&B Albums of 2017 list. On December 29, 2017, the duo released the theme song for the TV series Grown-ish, entitled "Grown". Bailey was cast as Jazlyn "Jazz" Forster in a recurring capacity in the first season before being upgraded to series regular starting with the second. She later departed the series at the end of the fourth season, when her character graduated from college. Both "Grown" and "The Kids Are Alright" served as the lead and second singles, respectively, of Chloe x Halle's debut studio album, The Kids Are Alright, which they announced in late February 2018. The album was paired with a visual. Chloe x Halle released their debut studio album, The Kids Are Alright, on March 23, 2018, to critical acclaim. Their single, "Warrior", appeared on both the soundtrack for the film A Wrinkle in Time (2018), as well as their debut album.

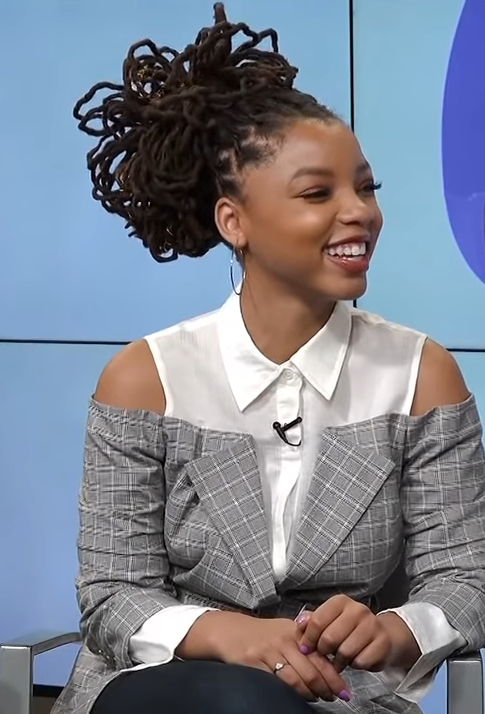
Bailey in 2018

On May 31, 2018, it was announced that they would be the opening act for the U.S. leg of Beyoncé and Jay-Z's On the Run II Tour, alongside DJ Khaled. The duo were nominated for two Grammy Awards in December 2018, namely Best New Artist and Best Urban Contemporary Album (for The Kids Are Alright).

On February 3, 2019, Chloe x Halle's performance of "America the Beautiful" at the Super Bowl LIII was praised by their mentor Beyoncé in addition to several news publications. A week later, on February 10, 2019, the duo honored American musician Donny Hathaway by performing his 1972 single "Where Is the Love" at the 61st Annual Grammy Awards. In November 2019, it was announced that Bailey joined the cast of the horror film, The Exorcism, directed by M. A. Fortin and Joshua John Miller. She also starred alongside Madelaine Petsch in the 2022 psychological drama film Jane.

On June 12, 2020, the duo released their sophomore album, Ungodly Hour, to critical acclaim. The album debuted at number 16 on the Billboard 200 chart with 24,000 units sold. "Do It" also became their first entry on the Billboard Hot 100, debuting at number 83 on the chart dated June 27, 2020. Chloe x Halle performed the American national anthem at the kickoff game for the 2020 NFL season in September 2020. The duo hosted the Glamour Women of the Year Awards in October 2020. In November 2020, they received nominations for Album of the Year, Song of the Year, Video of the Year, Best Dance Performance and The Ashford And Simpson Songwriter's Award at the 2020 Soul Train Music Awards. They also received nominations for Best Progressive R&B Album, Best R&B Song and Best Traditional R&B Performance at the 63rd Annual Grammy Awards. They performed "Baby Girl" at the 2020 Billboard Women in Music ceremony, where Beyoncé presented them with the Rising Star Award.

=== 2021–23: Solo endeavors and In Pieces ===
In August 2021, Bailey announced the release of her debut solo single, "Have Mercy". She had teased the Murda Beatz-produced song numerous times before. Bailey revealed that the album was "90% done" and that it is more pop-oriented. On September 12, she performed "Have Mercy" at the main show of the 2021 MTV Video Music Awards. At the 53rd NAACP Image Awards Bailey was nominated in three categories, including Outstanding Female Artist and Outstanding Soul/R&B Song for "Have Mercy".

In late August 2021, Bailey co-starred alongside Kesha and Mason Gooding in the scripted podcast, Electric Easy, a show set in a futuristic Los Angeles in which humans struggle to co-exist with robots, known as "electrics". The show was created by Vanya Asher and executively produced by Kesha. The podcast premiered on August 30, 2021.

In April 2022, Bailey released "Treat Me" with an accompanying music video as her second solo single. She explained that the inspiration for the song came after a breakup, when she thought, "'It's time for me to just give myself the love that I'm looking for.'" Her third single, "Surprise" was released in June 2022. "For the Night" was released as her fourth single in October 2022. The song features American rapper Latto. In November 2022, she sang the national anthem during Game 3 at the 2022 World Series.

On January 24, 2023, she announced her debut solo album, titled In Pieces, which was released on March 31, 2023. She revealed later that month that her first four singles were not included on the album because they were "sticking out". She released the lead single from the album, "Pray It Away", on January 27, 2023, and the second single, "How Does It Feel" featuring Chris Brown, on February 24. The third single "Body Do" was released on March 24, 2023, after being in a Beats ad. "Cheatback" was released as the final single from the album, after initially being performed on "Jimmy Kimmel Live!". The song features American rapper Future.

In December 2023, Chlöe covered the song "Winter Wonderland" for Amazon Music as part of their Amazon Original Music series. The cover peaked at number 87 on the Billboard Hot 100,

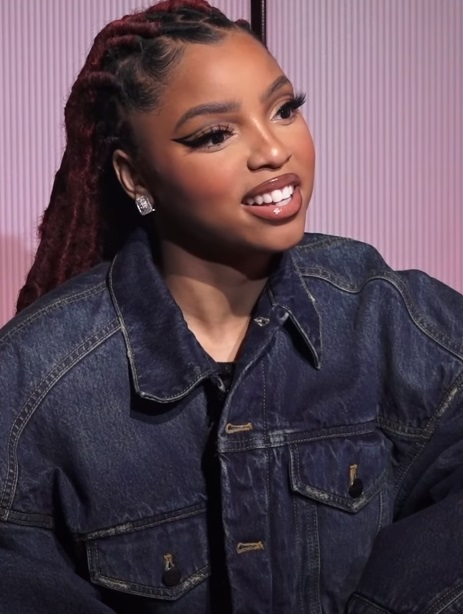
Bailey in 2023

making her version of the song the first to ever enter the chart.

=== 2024–present: Trouble in Paradise and collaborations ===
In March 2024, Bailey released "FYS" as the lead single of her second studio album, Trouble In Paradise. The second single "Boy Bye" was released in the following month. During her Coachella performance on April 19, 2024, she announced the title of her sophomore album. In July, Bailey was featured on a remix of Tinashe's single "Nasty" titled "Nasty Girl Remix". Trouble In Paradise, inspired by her experiences in Saint Lucia, was released on August 9, 2024. The album cover and visualizers for the project's tracklist were shot there, and Bailey considers the country to be her "sanctuary."

On July 6, 2026, Bailey performed in an Aaliyah tribute, curated by Missy Elliott, for the finale at that year's Essence Festival of Culture.

== Artistry ==
Bailey's biggest musical influence is her mentor American singer Beyoncé, and has also stated Kelis is a major influence. She is also inspired by artists such as Whitney Houston, Aaliyah, Donna Summer, Kanye West, Lauryn Hill, Grimes, Missy Elliott, Mya, Imogen Heap, Jill Scott, Jazmine Sullivan, Alicia Keys, Otis Redding, Tune-Yards and TLC.

== Personal life ==
Bailey shared via TikTok Live on June 11, 2024, that she had stopped being a vegan after nearly 11 years, stating that she has noticed benefits and has not experienced any negative effects since changing her diet.

== Discography ==
Chloe discography
- Studio albums: 2
- EPs: 1
- Mixtapes: 1
- Singles: 16

=== Studio albums ===
List of studio albums, with selected details and chart positions
| Title | Details | Peak chart positions | | |
| Title | Details | US | US R&B | UK DL |
|---|---|---|---|---|
| In Pieces | Released: March 31, 2023; Label: Parkwood, Columbia; Format: CD, digital download, streaming | 119 | 17 | 59 |
| Trouble in Paradise | Released: August 9, 2024; Label: Parkwood, Columbia; Format: Digital download, streaming | — | — | — |
"–" denotes a recording that did not chart or was not released in that territory.

=== Extended plays ===
List of extended play(s), with selected details
| Title | Details |
|---|---|
| A Chloe Christmas | Released: November 13, 2026; Label: Parkwood, Columbia; Format: Digital download, streaming |

=== Mixtapes ===
List of mixtape(s), with selected details
| Title | Details |
|---|---|
| Resurrection (with Timbaland) | Released: June 19, 2026; Label: Parkwood, Columbia; Format: Digital download, streaming |

=== Singles ===
List of singles, with selected chart positions and certifications, showing year released and album name
| Title | Year | Peak chart positions | | | | | | | | Certifications | Album |
| Title | Year | US | US R&B/ HH | US R&B | CAN | IRE | NZ Hot | UK | WW | Certifications | Album |
|---|---|---|---|---|---|---|---|---|---|---|---|
| "Have Mercy" | 2021 | 28 | 10 | 3 | 87 | 80 | 15 | 72 | 45 | MC: Gold; RIAA: Platinum | Non-album singles |
| "Treat Me" | 2022 | 81 | 27 | 6 | — | — | 19 | — | — | | Non-album singles |
| "Surprise" | 2022 | — | — (Note: "Surprise" did not enter the Hot R&B/Hip-Hop Songs chart, but peaked at number 24 on the R&B/Hip-Hop Digital Song Sales chart.) | 20 | — | — | — | — | — | | Non-album singles |
| "For the Night" (featuring Latto) | 2022 | — (Note: "For the Night" did not enter the Billboard Hot 100, but peaked at number 25 on the Bubbling Under Hot 100 Singles chart.) | — (Note: "For the Night" did not enter the Hot R&B/Hip-Hop Songs chart, but peaked at number 15 on the R&B/Hip-Hop Digital Song Sales chart.) | 16 | — | — | 35 | — | — | | Non-album singles |
| "Pray It Away" | 2023 | — | — (Note: "Pray It Away" did not enter the Hot R&B/Hip-Hop Songs chart, but peaked at number 16 on the R&B/Hip-Hop Digital Song Sales chart.) | — (Note: "Pray It Away" did not enter the Hot R&B Songs chart, but peaked at number 11 on the R&B Digital Song Sales chart.) | — | — | — | — | — | | In Pieces |
| "How Does It Feel" (with Chris Brown) | 2023 | — (Note: "How Does It Feel" did not enter the Billboard Hot 100, but peaked at number 10 on the Bubbling Under Hot 100 Singles chart.) | 47 | 17 | — | — | 5 | — | — | | In Pieces |
| "Body Do" | 2023 | — | — | — | — | — | — | — | — | | In Pieces |
| "In Pieces" | 2023 | — | — | — | — | — | — | — | — | | In Pieces |
| "Merry Christmas Baby" | 2023 | — | — | — | — | — | — | — | — | | Non-album singles |
| "Winter Wonderland" | 2023 | 87 | 19 | 5 | — | — | — | — | — | | Non-album singles |
| "FYS" | 2024 | — | — | — | — | — | — | — | — | | Trouble in Paradise |
| "Boy Bye" | 2024 | — | — | — | — | — | — | — | — | | Trouble in Paradise |
| "Tell Me" (with Joey Bada$$) | 2024 | — | — | — | — | — | 26 | — | — | | Non-album singles |
| "Keep Watching" | 2025 | — | — | — | — | — | — | — | — | | Non-album singles |
| "Company" (with Clean Bandit and Omah Lay) | 2026 | — | — | — | — | — | — | — | — | | Non-album singles |
| "Mrs. Claus Don't Have 2 Know" | 2026 | — | — | — | — | — | — | — | — | | A Chloe Christmas |
"–" denotes a recording that did not chart or was not released in that territory.

=== Other charted songs ===
List of other charted songs, with selected chart positions, showing year released and album name
| Title | Year | Peak chart positions | | | | | Album |
| Title | Year | US | US R&B/ HH | US Rap | CAN | WW | Album |
|---|---|---|---|---|---|---|---|
| "You & Me" (with Gunna) | 2022 | 72 | 29 | 20 | 99 | 97 | DS4Ever |

=== Guest appearances ===
List of non-single guest appearances, with other performing artists, showing year released and album name
| Title | Year | Other artist(s) | Album |
|---|---|---|---|
| "Feeling Good" | 2021 | none | Liberated / Music For the Movement Vol. 3 |
| "You & Me" | 2022 | Gunna | DS4Ever |
| "Cry For Me" (unreleased) | 2022 | 6lack | non-album song |
| "Hello" | 2022 | Fivio Foreign, KayCyy | B.I.B.L.E. |
| "Gyalis" (Shemix) | 2022 | Capella Grey | non-album song |
| "Woman of the Year" | 2022 | Calvin Harris, Stefflon Don, Coi Leray | Funk Wav Bounces Vol. 2 |
| "Universal Love" | 2022 | The Game, Chris Brown, Cassie | Drillmatic – Heart vs. Mind |
| "Leak It" | 2022 | Ari Lennox | Age/Sex/Location |
| "Don't Worry 'Bout Me" (Sam's Remix) | 2023 | none | Praise This (Original Motion Picture Soundtrack) |
| "Watch Me" | 2023 | none | Praise This (Original Motion Picture Soundtrack) |
| "Don't Worry 'Bout Me" (Praise God) | 2023 | Oil Factory | Praise This (Original Motion Picture Soundtrack) |
| "Break Every Chain" (Local Qualifiers Performance) | 2023 | Oil Factory, Jekalyn Carr, Druski | Praise This (Original Motion Picture Soundtrack) |
| "Sam's Freestyle Medley" | 2023 | none | Praise This (Original Motion Picture Soundtrack) |
| "Don't Worry 'Bout Me" (Can't Help It) | 2023 | none | Praise This (Original Motion Picture Soundtrack) |
| "Praise Nationals Finale" | 2023 | Oil Factory, Jekalyn Carr, Loren Lott | Praise This (Original Motion Picture Soundtrack) |
| "Total Praise" | 2023 | Oil Factory | Praise This (Original Motion Picture Soundtrack) |
| "Princess Cut" | 2023 | Offset | Set It Off |
| "Honey" | 2023 | BJ the Chicago Kid | Gravy |
| "Mistaken" | 2023 | Libianca, Oxlade | Walk Away |
| "Vision" (Remix) | 2024 | Qing Madi | Qing Madi |
| "Nasty Girl Remix" | 2024 | Tinashe | Match My Freak EP |
| "Survive” | 2024 | Childish Gambino | Bando Stone & the New World |
| "Soft" (Unlocked) | 2024 | Flo, Halle | Access All Areas: Unlocked |
| "MIA" | 2024 | Khalid | Sincere (Deluxe Edition) |
| "The Greatest Bend Over" (Remix) | 2025 | Young Bredda, Moliy | TBA |
| "The Nightlife" | 2025 | Honey Dijon | The Nightlife |
| "WIT IT" | 2025 | Ty Dolla Sign | Tycoon |
| "So I Can Feel Again" | 2025 | Halle | Love?... or Something Like It |
| "Weakness" (Remix) | 2025 | Kiana Ledé | Cut Ties (Deluxe) |
| "Lose Myself" | 2026 | Victoria Monét | Frequency of Love |

== Production discography ==
=== 2016 ===
==== Chloe x Halle – Sugar Symphony ====
- 01. Drop (co-produced with Halle Bailey)
- 02. Red Lights (co-produced with Halle Bailey, HazeBanga & Hit-Boy)
- 03. Lazy Love (co-produced with Halle Bailey & Samir)
- 04. Thunder (co-produced with Halle Bailey & xSDTRK)
- 05. Fall

=== 2017 ===
==== Chloe x Halle – The Two of Us ====
- 01. Used to Love (co-produced with Halle Bailey)
- 02. Too Much Sauce (co-produced with Halle Bailey)
- 03. Future (co-produced with Halle Bailey)
- 04. Poppy Flower (co-produced with Halle Bailey)
- 05. Chase (co-produced with Halle Bailey)
- 06. Partna
- 07. DumDumDum (co-produced with Halle Bailey)
- 08. Worries (co-produced with Halle Bailey & Steve Lacy)
- 09. Upset Stomach
- 10. Simple
- 11. Mistake
- 12. All I Ever Wanted
- 13. Tra Ta Ta (co-produced with Halle Bailey)
- 14. Up All Night
- 15. Lucky Lead
- 16. Lulla-Bye

==== Various Artists – Dear White People (A Netflix Original Series Soundtrack) ====
- 10. Chloe x Halle – "Bougie Party" (co-produced with Halle Bailey & bLAck pARty)

=== 2018 ===
==== Chloe x Halle – The Kids Are Alright ====
- 01. Hello Friend (Intro) (co-produced with Halle Bailey)
- 02. The Kids Are Alright
- 03. Grown
- 04. Hi Lo (featuring GoldLink) (co-produced with Pluss)
- 05. Everywhere (co-produced with Pluss)
- 06. FaLaLa (Interlude) (co-produced with Halle Bailey)
- 07. Fake (featuring Kari Faux) (co-produced with bLAck pARty & Doc Allison)
- 08. Baptize (Interlude) (co-produced with Halle Bailey)
- 09. Down (co-produced with Halle Bailey)
- 10. Galaxy
- 11. Happy Without Me (featuring Joey Bada$$) (co-produced with Halle Bailey, The Messengers & Sad Money)
- 12. Babybird (co-produced with Halle Bailey & Derek Dixie)
- 13. Warrior
- 14. Cool People (co-produced with Halle Bailey & Malay)
- 15. Baby on a Plane
- 17. Drop (co-produced with Halle Bailey)
- 18. Fall

==== Trolls: The Beat Goes On! ====
- Chloe x Halle – "Shine Bright" (co-produced with Halle Bailey)

=== 2019 ===
==== Various Artists – Little (Original Motion Picture Soundtrack) ====
- 01. Chloe x Halle – "Be Yourself" (co-produced with Halle Bailey)

==== Chloe x Halle – Thinkin' About Me / Who Knew (single) ====
(co-produced with Halle Bailey)

==== El Camino: A Breaking Bad Movie ====
- Chloe x Halle – "Enchanted" (co-produced with Halle Bailey)

=== 2020 ===
==== Chloe x Halle – Ungodly Hour ====
- 01. Intro
- 02. Forgive Me (co-produced with Sounwave & Jake One)
- 03. Baby Girl
- 04. Do It (co-produced with Scott Storch, Avedon & Asoteric)
- 05. Tipsy
- 07. Busy Boy (co-produced with Gitty & Nasri)
- 08. Catch Up (featuring Swae Lee & Mike WiLL Made It) (co-produced with Mike WiLL Made It, Pluss & Royal Z)
- 09. Overwhelmed
- 10. Lonely (co-produced with Halle Bailey, Scott Storch & Avedon)
- 11. Don't Make It Harder on Me (co-produced with Nasri & Gitty)
- 12. Wonder What She Thinks of Me (co-produced with Halle Bailey)
- 13. Rest of Your Life (co-produced with Halle Bailey, Boi-1da, Vinylz & Jahaan Sweet)

==== Chloe x Halle – Spotify Singles ====
- 01. Tipsy
- 02. Sendin' My Love

=== 2021 ===
==== Chloe x Halle – Ungodly Hour (Chrome Edition) ====
- 14. Hazy
- 15. 80/20 (co-produced with Halle Bailey & Bregma)

==== Chloe x Halle – Georgia on My Mind (single) ====
(co-produced with Derek Dixie)

==== Various Artists – Music for the Movement Vol. 3: Liberated ====
- 03. Chlöe – "Feeling Good"

==== Apple Music – Juneteenth: Freedom Songs ====
- 05. "Waterfalls" (co-produced with Organized Noize)

==== Chlöe – Have Mercy (single) ====
(co-produced with Murda Beatz, Joseph L'étranger, FnZ & BoogzDaBeast)

=== 2022 ===
==== Chlöe – Spotify Singles ====
- 01. "Surprise" (Unplugged Remix) (co-produced with Derek Dixie)

=== 2023 ===
==== Chlöe – In Pieces ====
- 02. "Pray It Away" (co-produced with ThankGod4Cody, Ecasssh, Pitt Tha Kid & Puredandy)
- 03. "Body Do" (co-produced with 2300)
- 12. "Cheatback" (featuring Future) (co-produced with Gitty)

=== 2024 ===
==== Chlöe – Trouble in Paradise ====
- 09. "Never Let You Go" (featuring YG Marley) (co-produced with Dawda, Aladdin & Go Grizzly)
- 12. "FYS" (co-produced with BongoByTheWay, Cashmere Brown & Go Grizzly)

== Tours ==
=== Headlining ===
- In Pieces Tour (2023)

== Filmography ==
=== Film ===
Key
| X | Denotes works that have not yet been released |

| Year | Film | Role | Notes | Ref. |
|---|---|---|---|---|
| 2003 | The Fighting Temptations | Young Lilly | | |
| 2006 | Last Holiday | Anna | | |
| 2008 | Meet the Browns | Tosha | | |
| 2009 | Gospel Hill | Anna | | |
| 2012 | Let It Shine | Choir Member | | |
| 2012 | Joyful Noise | Our Lady of Perpetual Tears Choir Member | | |
| 2016 | Beyoncé: Lemonade | Cameo | Segment: "All Night" intro | |
| 2018 | The Kids Are Alright | Herself | Short film | |
| 2021 | Why The Sun and the Moon Live in the Sky | Moon | Short film | |
| 2021 | Chloe Bailey presented by Fendi | Herself | Short film | |
| 2022 | Jane | Isabelle "Izzy" Morris | | |
| 2023 | Praise This | Sam | | |
| 2024 | The Exorcism | Blake Holloway | | |
| 2025 | Sneaks | Maxine (voice) | | |
| 2026 | Strung | Laila Calloway | | |
| 2026 | The Julia Set † | | Post-production | |
| TBA | Goons † | Ebony | In production | |

=== Television ===
| Year | Title | Role | Notes | Ref. |
|---|---|---|---|---|
| 2012 | The Ellen Show | Herself | Episode dated: "April 9, 2012" | |
| 2013 | Austin & Ally | Herself | Episode: "Moon Week & Mentors" | |
| 2018 | Wild 'n Out | Herself | Episode: "Chloe x Halle" | |
| 2018–2022 | Grown-ish | Jazlyn Forster | Main cast (seasons 1–4), guest role (season 5) | |
| 2020 | The Disney Family Singalong: Volume II | Herself | Television special | |
| 2020 | The Kelly Clarkson Show | Herself | Episode dated: "July 9, 2020" | |
| 2020 | The Disney Holiday Singalong | Herself | Television special | |
| 2020 | Black-ish | Jazlyn Forster | Episode: "Love, Boat" | |
| 2021 | Cardi Tries | Herself | Episode: "Cardi Tries Wildlife" | |
| 2022 | The Hair Tales | Herself | Episode: "Oprah Winfrey, Beyond a Wild Dream" | |
| 2023 | Swarm | Marissa Jackson | Recurring | |
| 2023 | The Jason Lee Show | Herself | Season 1: Episode 16 | |
| 2024 | Fight Night: The Million Dollar Heist | Lena Mosley | Miniseries | |
| 2026 | The Proud Family: Louder and Prouder | DJ Money Drip (voice) | Episode: "Wild, Lost and Free, Part II" | |

=== Podcasts ===
| Year | Title | Role | Notes | Ref. |
|---|---|---|---|---|
| 2021 | Electric Easy | Vector | Lead role | |

=== Music videos ===
- "Have Mercy" (2021)
- "You & Me" (with Gunna) (2022)
- "Treat Me" (2022)
- "Hello" (2022)
- "Surprise" (2022)
- "For the Night" (with Latto) (2022)
- "Pray It Away" (2023)
- "How Does It Feel" (with Chris Brown) (2023)
- "Cheatback" (with Future) (2023)
- "Boy Bye" (2024)
- "Vision Remix" (with Qing Madi) (2024)
- “The Greatest Bend Over (Take It Easy) Remix” (with MOLIY) (2025)

== Awards and nominations ==
| Year | Award | Category | Work | Result | Ref. |
|---|---|---|---|---|---|
| 2020 | Soul Train Music Awards | The Ashford And Simpson Songwriter's Award | "Do It" (as songwriter) | Nominated | |
| 2021 | Grammy Awards | Best R&B Song | "Do It" (as songwriter) | Nominated | |
| 2022 | NAACP Image Awards | Outstanding Female Artist | Herself | Nominated | |
| 2022 | NAACP Image Awards | Outstanding Music Video/Visual Album | "Have Mercy" | Nominated | |
| 2022 | NAACP Image Awards | Outstanding Soul/R&B Song | "Have Mercy" | Nominated | |
| 2022 | Nickelodeon Kids' Choice Awards | Favourite Breakout Artist | Herself | Nominated | |
| 2022 | iHeartRadio Music Awards | Best New R&B Artist | Herself | Nominated | |
| 2022 | BET Awards | Best Female R&B/Pop Artist | Herself | Nominated | |
| 2022 | BET Awards | Video of the Year | "Have Mercy" | Nominated | |
| 2022 | BET Awards | BET Her Award | "Have Mercy" | Nominated | |
| 2022 | MTV Video Music Awards | Best R&B | "Have Mercy" | Nominated | |
| 2022 | MTV Europe Music Awards | Best R&B | Herself | Won | |
| 2022 | Soul Train Music Awards | Best Dance Performance | "Have Mercy" | Nominated | |
| 2022 | Soul Train Music Awards | Video of the Year | "Have Mercy" | Nominated | |
| 2022 | People's Choice Awards | The New Artist of 2022 | Herself | Nominated | |
| 2022 | Bulletin Awards | Female Artist of the Year | Herself | Nominated | |
| 2022 | Bulletin Awards | Performance of the Year | "Have Mercy" (AMAs 2021) | Nominated | |
| 2023 | ASCAP Rhythm & Soul Music Awards | Most Performed R&B/Hip-Hop and Rap Song | "Have Mercy" | Won | |
| 2023 | NAACP Image Awards | Outstanding Female Artist | Herself | Nominated | |
| 2023 | iHeartRadio Music Awards | Favourite Use of a Sample | "Treat Me" | Nominated | |
| 2023 | Juno Awards | Video of the Year | "Have Mercy" | Nominated | |
| 2023 | Hollywood Unlock Impact Awards | Fearlessness Award | Herself | Won | |
| 2023 | Innovators & Leaders Awards | Innovator Honoree | Herself | Won | |
| 2023 | Bulletin Awards | Producer of the Year | Herself | Nominated | |
| 2023 | MTV Video Music Awards | Best R&B | "How Does It Feel" (with Chris Brown) | Nominated | |
| 2023 | MTV Europe Music Awards | Best R&B | Herself | Nominated | |
| 2023 | Girls Make Beats Gala | Powerhouse Producer Award | Herself | Won | |
| 2023 | Hollywood Music in Media Awards | Best Song - Onscreen Performance (Film) | Praise Finale (for 'Praise This') | Nominated | |
| 2023 | UB Honors | Best Actress | Herself | Won | |
| 2024 | Urban One Honors | Generation Next | Herself | Won | |
| 2024 | iHeartRadio Music Awards | Favorite Debut Album | In Pieces | Nominated | |
| 2024 | Most Underrated Awards | Most Underrated - Album Of The Year | In Pieces | Nominated | |
| 2024 | NAACP Image Awards | Outstanding Actress in a Television Movie, Limited–Series or Dramatic Special | Praise This | Won | |
| 2024 | Glamour Women of the Year | Musician of the Year | Herself | Won | |
| 2025 | NAACP Image Awards | Outstanding Music Video/Visual Album | "Boy Bye" | Nominated | |
| 2025 | The Headies Awards | International Artist of The Year | Herself | Nominated | |
